= John Casper =

American astronaut (born 1943)

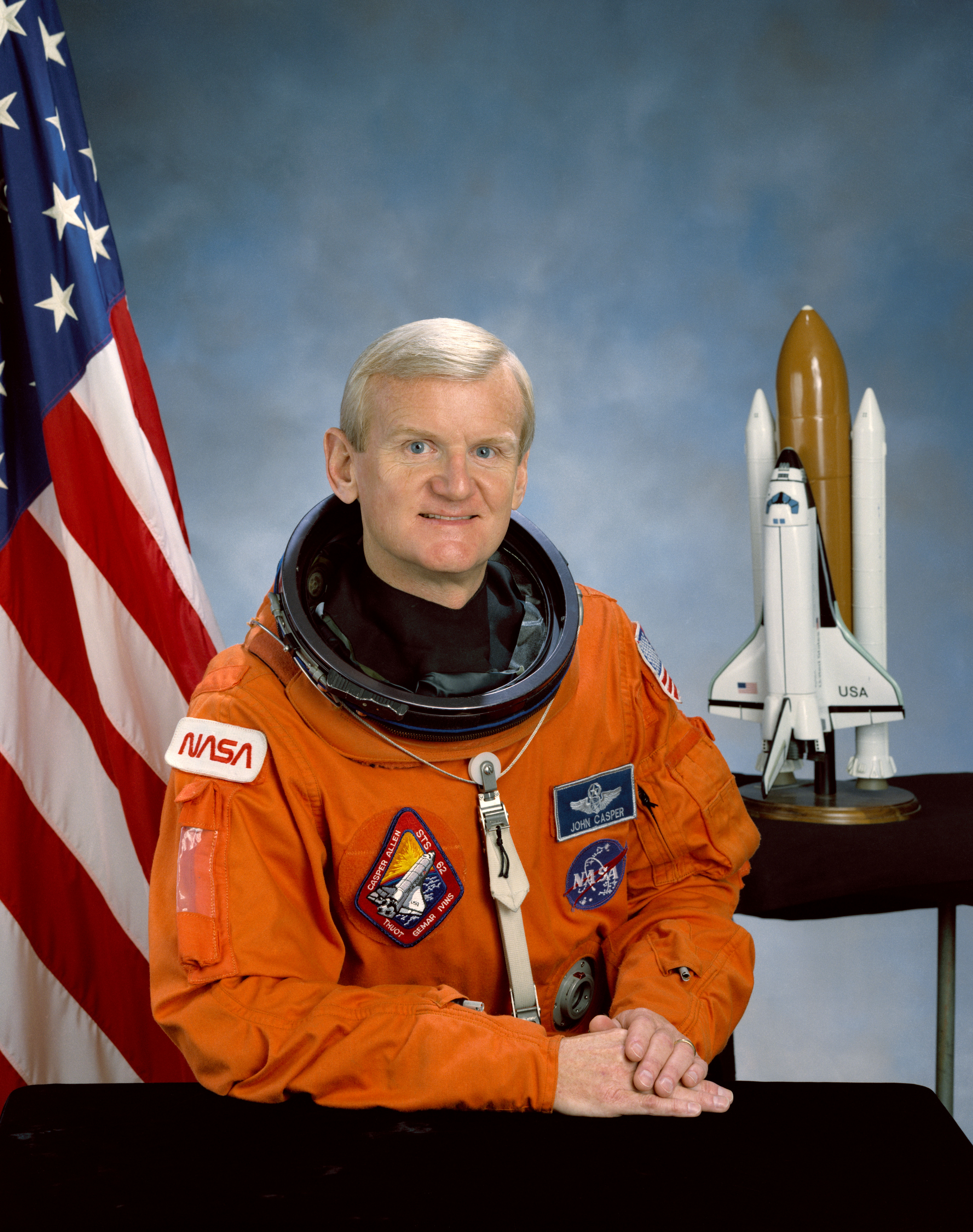
- Born: John Howard Casper; July 9, 1943 (age 83); Greenville, South Carolina, U.S.
- Education: United States Air Force Academy (BS); Purdue University (MS)
- Space career

NASA astronaut
- Rank: Colonel, USAF
- Time in space: 34d 9h 52m
- Selection: NASA Group 10 (1984)
- Missions: STS-36; STS-54; STS-62; STS-77
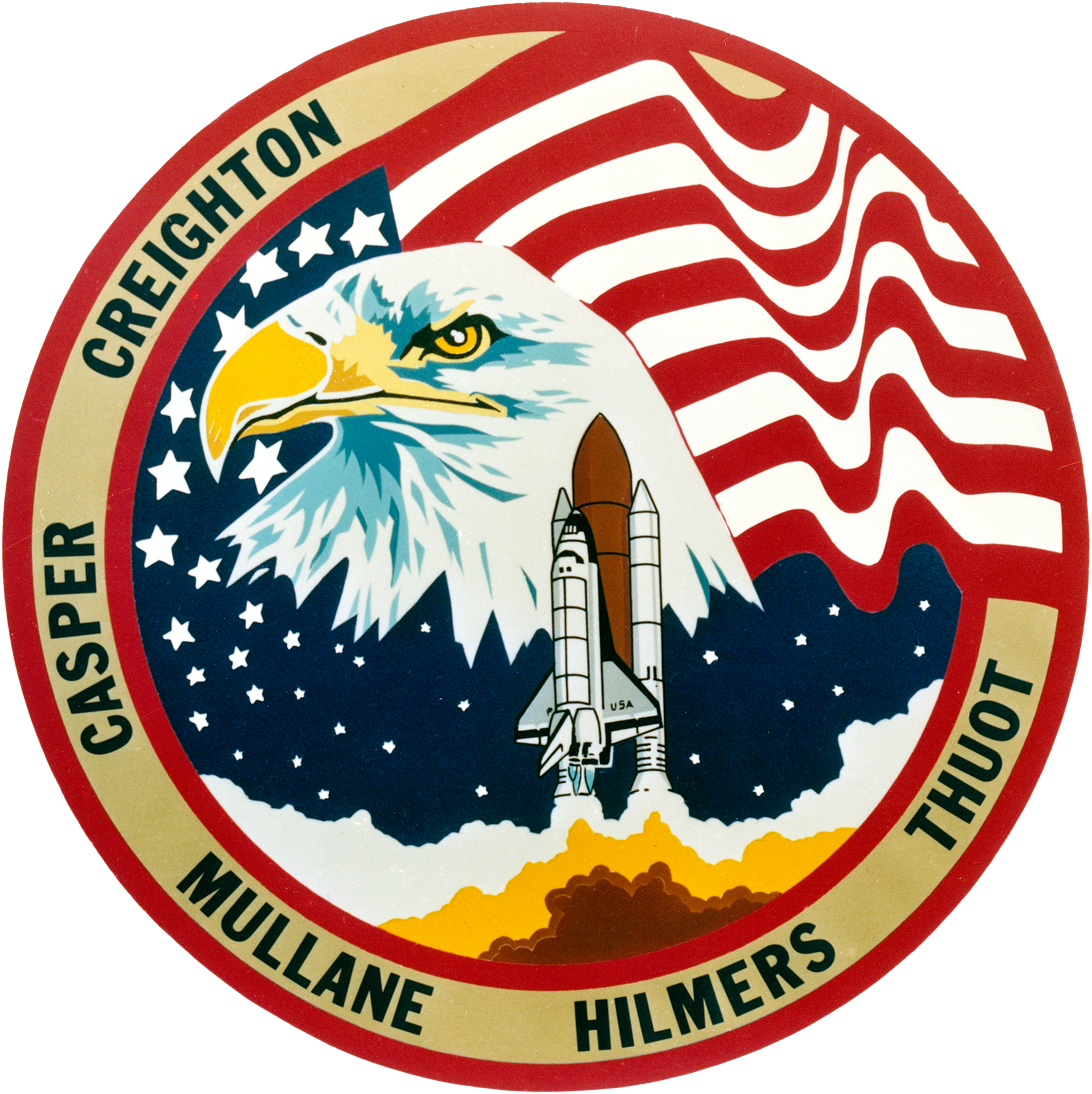
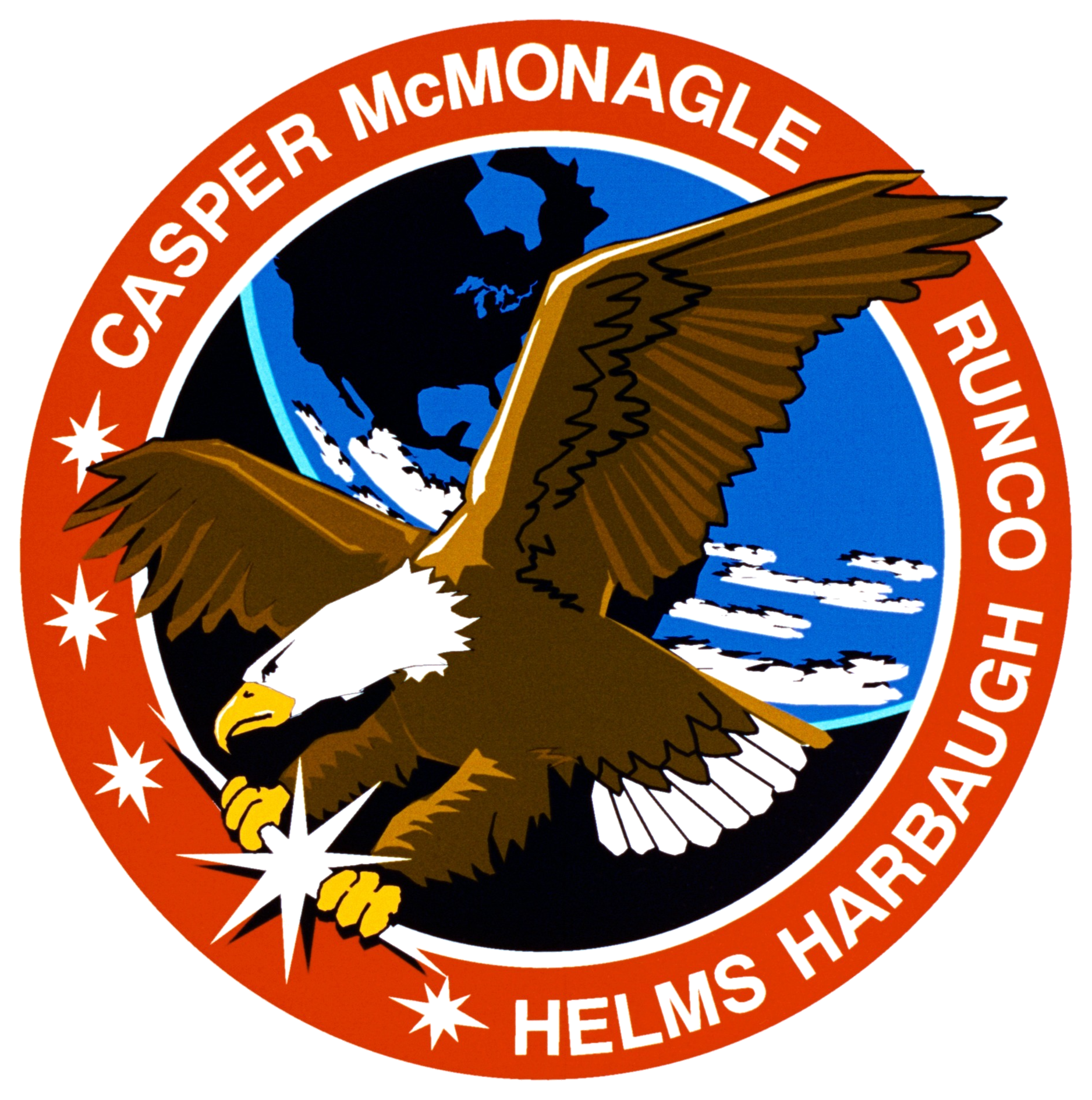
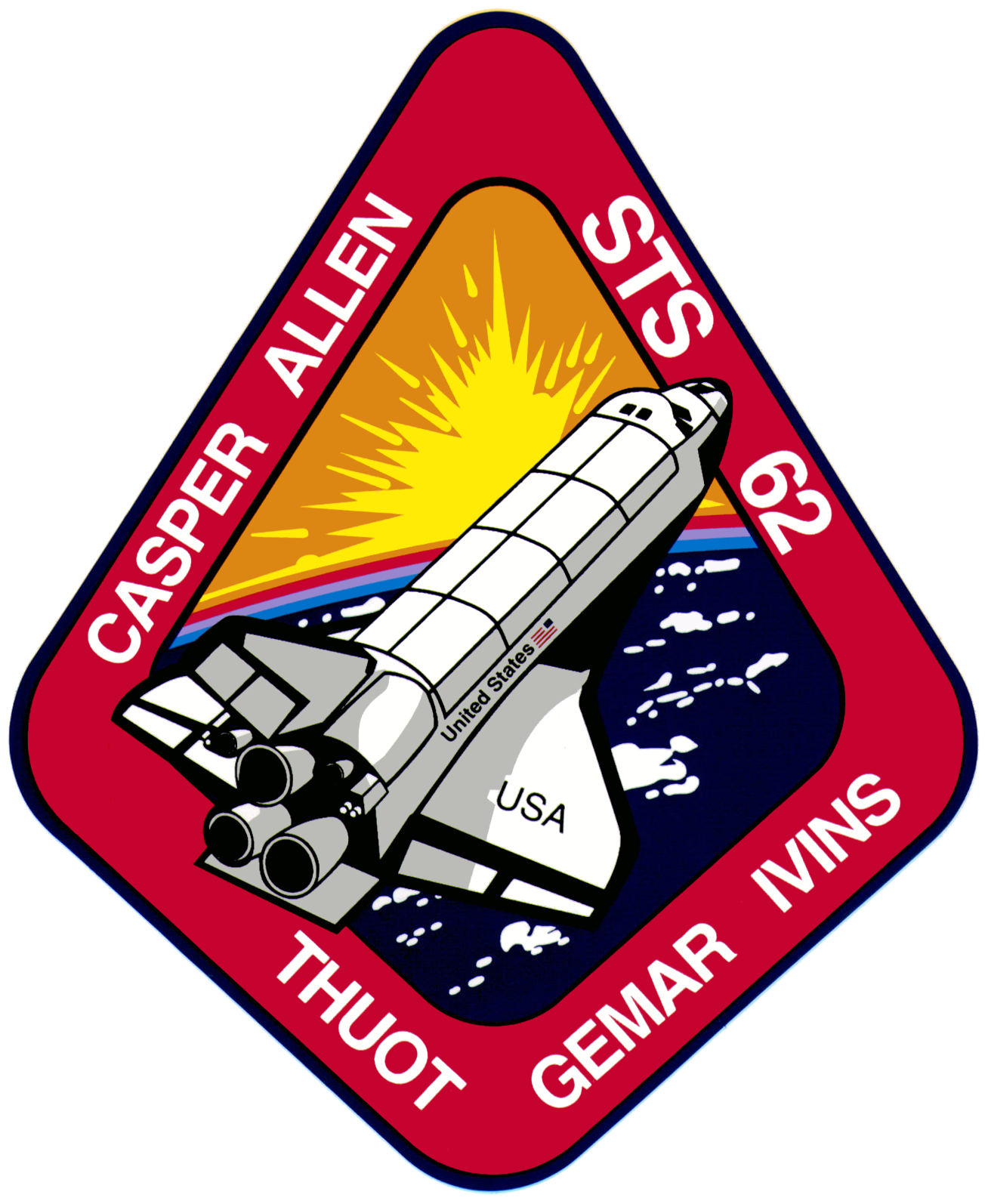
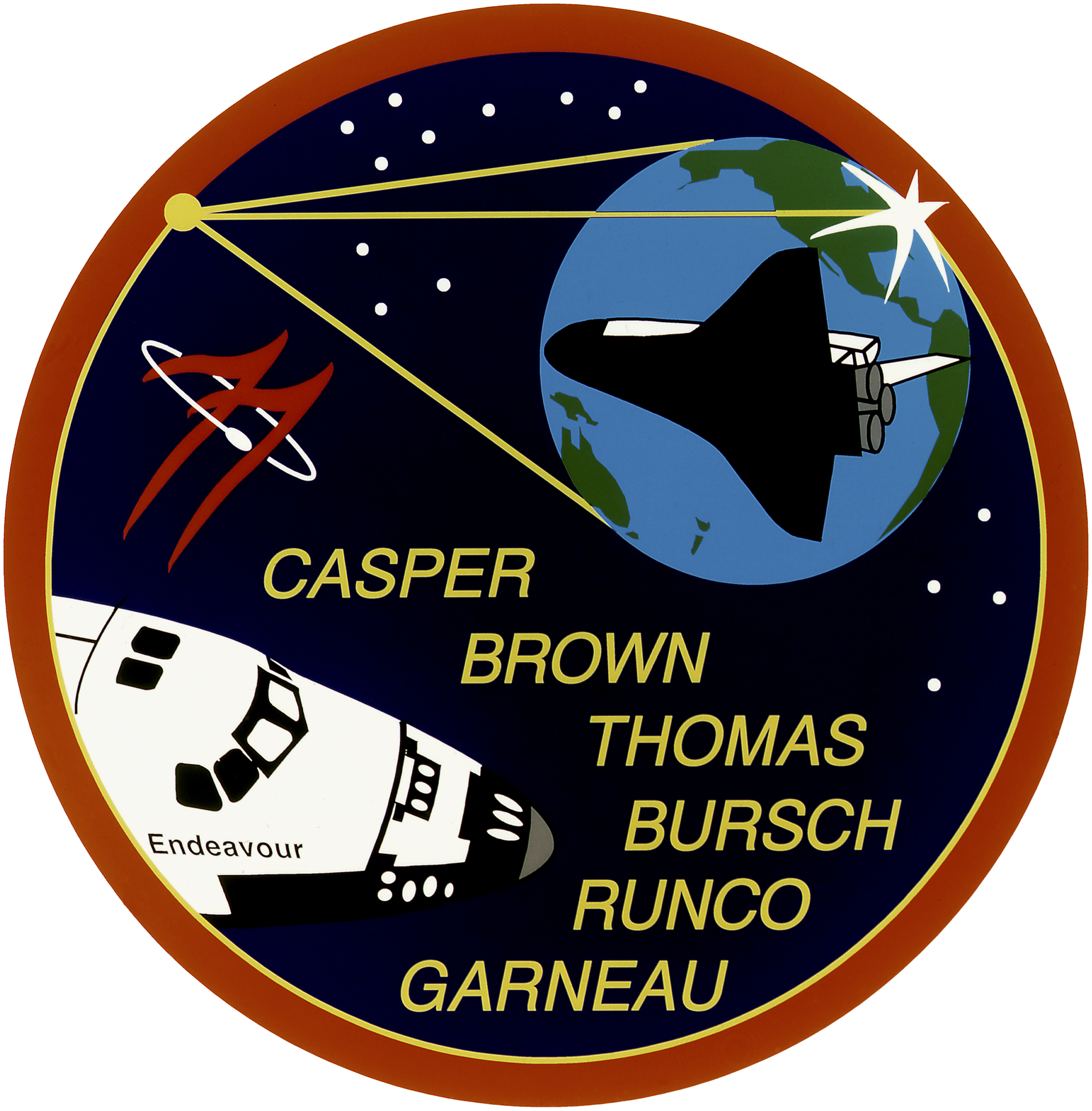
- Mission insignia

John Howard Casper (born July 9, 1943) is a former American astronaut and retired United States Air Force pilot.

== Early life and education ==
Although born on July 9, 1943, in Greenville, South Carolina, Casper considers Gainesville, Georgia to be his hometown. He was active in the Boy Scouts of America and achieved its second-highest rank, Life Scout.

He graduated with a Bachelor of Science degree in engineering science from the United States Air Force Academy in 1966, and a Master of Science degree in astronautics from Purdue University in 1967.

== Military career ==
Before he was an astronaut, Casper was a United States Air Force (USAF) fighter pilot, earning his pilot wings at Reese Air Force Base, Texas. After F-100 Super Sabre training at Luke Air Force Base, Arizona, he flew 229 combat missions with the 35th Tactical Fighter Wing in the Vietnam War. Following his tour in Vietnam, Casper flew F-100 and F-4 Phantom aircraft while assigned to the 48th Tactical Fighter Wing, Royal Air Force Lakenheath, United Kingdom.

Casper was selected to attend the U.S. Air Force Test Pilot School at Edwards Air Force Base, California, and graduated with class 74A. After graduating he became Chief of the F-4 Test Team; he flew initial performance and weapons separation tests for the F-4G Wild Weasel aircraft and avionics tests for F-4E and A-7 Corsair II aircraft. Casper then became operations officer and later commander of the 6513th Test Squadron, where he conducted flight test programs to evaluate and develop tactical aircraft weapons systems. He was then assigned to Headquarters, USAF at the Pentagon and was Deputy Chief of the Special Projects Office, where he developed USAF positions on requirements, operational concepts, policy and force structure for tactical and strategic programs.

Colonel Casper has logged over 10,000 flying hours in 52 different aircraft.

== NASA astronaut ==
Selected by NASA in May 1984, Casper became an astronaut in June 1985. A veteran of four space flights, he has logged over 825 hours in space. He was the pilot on mission STS-36, and spacecraft commander on missions STS-54, STS-62 and STS-77. His technical assignments while assigned to the Astronaut Office included Chief of the Operations Development Branch; lead for improvements to the nosewheel steering, brakes, tires, and development of a landing drag chute; astronaut team leader for the Shuttle Avionics Integration Laboratory (SAIL); and ascent/entry spacecraft communicator (CAPCOM) in the Mission Control Center.

=== Space flights ===
STS-36 launched from the Kennedy Space Center, Florida, on February 28, 1990, aboard Space Shuttle Atlantis. This mission carried classified Department of Defense payloads and was unique in that it flew at 62 degrees inclination, the highest inclination flown to date by the U.S. human space flight program. After 72 orbits of the Earth, the STS-36 mission concluded with a lakebed landing at Edwards Air Force Base, California, on March 4, 1990, after traveling 1.87 million miles. Mission duration was 106 hours, 19 minutes, 43 seconds.

STS-54 launched from the Kennedy Space Center, Florida, on January 13, 1993, aboard Space Shuttle Endeavour. A crew of five successfully accomplished the primary objectives of this six-day mission, including deploying a $200 million NASA Tracking and Data Relay Satellite (TDRS-F), which joined four other satellites to complete a national communications network supporting Space Shuttle and other low-Earth orbit scientific satellites. A Diffuse X-Ray Spectrometer (DXS) carried in the payload bay collected X-ray data to enable investigators to answer questions about the origin of X-rays in the Milky Way galaxy. A highly successful extravehicular activity (EVA) resulted in many lessons learned that benefited the International Space Station assembly. The flight was also the first to shut down and restart a fuel cell in flight, successfully demonstrating another Space Station application. Casper landed Endeavour at the Kennedy Space Center on January 19, 1993, after 96 Earth orbits covering over 2.5 million miles. Mission duration was 143 hours and 38 minutes.

STS-62 (March 4–18, 1994) was a two-week microgravity research mission aboard Space Shuttle Columbia. Its primary payloads were the United States Microgravity Payload (USMP-2) and the Office of Aeronautics and Space Technology (OAST-2) payloads. These payloads included experiments to understand the process of semiconductor crystal growth, investigating the process of metal alloys as they solidify, studying materials at their critical point (where they exist as both a liquid and gas), and testing new technology for use on future spacecraft, such as advanced solar arrays, radiators, heat sinks, and radiation shielding. The flight also tested new technology for aligning the Remote Manipulator System arm and for grasping payloads with a new magnetic end effector. Columbia flew at a record low altitude of 195 km (105 nautical miles) to gather data on spacecraft glow and erosion caused by atomic oxygen and nitrogen molecules. Casper landed Columbia at the Kennedy Space Center after 224 Earth orbits and 5.82 million miles.

STS-77 (May 19–29, 1996) was a ten-day mission aboard Space Shuttle Endeavour. The crew performed a record number of rendezvous sequences (one with a SPARTAN satellite and three with a deployed Satellite Test Unit) and approximately 21 hours of formation flying in close proximity of the satellites. During the flight the crew also conducted 12 experiments in materials processing, fluid physics and biotechnology in a Spacehab Module. STS-77 deployed and retrieved a SPARTAN satellite, which carried the Inflatable Antenna Experiment designed to test the concept of large, inflatable space structures. A small Satellite Test Unit was also deployed to test the concept of self-stabilization by using aerodynamic forces and magnetic damping. Casper brought Endeavour back to Earth at the Kennedy Space Center after 160 Earth orbits and 4.1 million miles. Mission duration was 240 hours and 39 minutes.

== Post-flight Career ==
Following his last Shuttle mission, Colonel Casper has served in positions of increasing responsibility in NASA. He was Director of Safety, Reliability, and Quality Assurance at the Johnson Space Center, where he was responsible for all safety, reliability and quality activities for JSC's human spaceflight programs, including the International Space Station, the Space Shuttle, Space Launch Initiative, and Crew Return Vehicles. He also was responsible for planning, directing and implementing an effective institutional safety program to prevent injuries, loss of life, or loss of capital assets.

After the Columbia disaster in February 2003, Casper became the NASA Mishap Investigation Team's deputy for the debris recovery operation, which involved directing the efforts of over 6,000 ground, air, and water search personnel, as well as protection and impoundment of debris. He was Co-Chair of the Return-To-Flight Planning Team, a NASA Headquarters-chartered independent team charged with addressing all actions necessary to comply with the Columbia Accident Investigation Board recommendations. He then joined the Space Shuttle program and became Manager of the Management Integration and Planning Office, responsible for Return-to-Flight planning and management integration across all program elements. Casper is currently Associate Manager of the Space Shuttle Program, assisting the program manager in the management, integration, and operations of the program.

In 2022, Casper published an autobiography of his experience in space titled The Sky Above: An Astronaut’s Memoir of Adventure, Persistence, and Faith.

== Honors ==
Colonel Casper has been awarded the Defense Superior Service Medal, two Legion of Merit Awards, two Distinguished Flying Crosses, 11 Air Medals, two Defense Meritorious Service Medals, six Air Force Commendation Medals, the Vietnam Cross of Gallantry, two NASA Distinguished Service Medals, the NASA Outstanding Leadership Medal, the NASA Exceptional Service Medal, four NASA Space Flight Medals, and the National Intelligence Medal of Achievement.
