= Andrew M. Allen =

American astronaut (born 1955)

Andy Allen
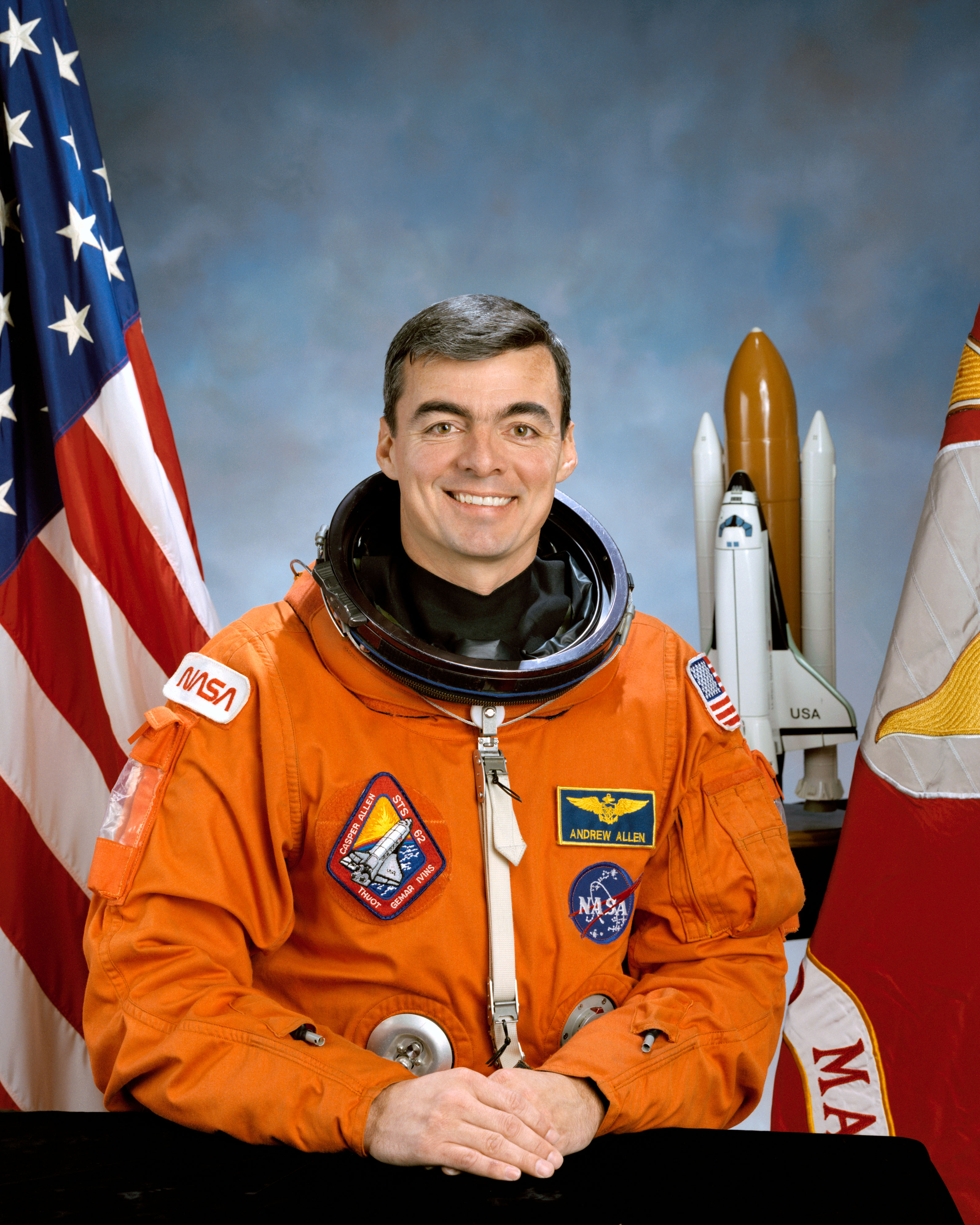
- Born: Andrew Michael Allen; August 4, 1955 (age 71); Richboro, Pennsylvania, U.S.
- Education: Villanova University (BS); University of Florida (MBA)
- Space career

NASA astronaut
- Rank: Lieutenant Colonel, USMC
- Time in space: 37d 16h 12m
- Selection: NASA Group 12 (1987)
- Missions: STS-46; STS-62; STS-75

Andrew Michael Allen (born 4 August 1955) is a retired American astronaut. A former Marine aviator and lieutenant colonel, he worked as a test pilot before joining NASA in 1987. He flew three Space Shuttle missions before retiring in 1997.

Since 2006, Allen was CEO and owner of Aerodyne Industries in Cape Canaveral, Florida.

== Early life and education ==
Andrew Michael Allen was born on 4 August 1955 in Richboro, Pennsylvania. He graduated from Archbishop Wood Catholic High School in 1973, following an education at Richboro Junior High (currently Richboro Middle School). In 2003, he was interviewed for the school's newspaper The Viking Voice about Allen's history with NASA and the future of the agency in regard to the then-recent Space Shuttle Columbia disaster. He subsequently studied at Villanova University where he received a Bachelor of Science degree in mechanical engineering in 1977. At Villanova, he was initiated into the Tau Kappa Epsilon fraternity. In 2004, Allen received an Master of Business Administration from the University of Florida.

== Career ==
=== Military ===
Allen received his commission in the United States Marine Corps at Villanova University in 1977. Following graduation from flight school, he flew F-4 Phantoms from 1980 to 1983 with squadron VMFA-312 at Marine Corps Air Station Beaufort, South Carolina, and was assigned as Aircraft Maintenance Officer. He was selected by Headquarters Marine Corps for fleet introduction of the F/A-18 Hornet, and was assigned to VMFA-531 in Marine Corps Air Station El Toro, California, from 1983 to 1986. During his stay in VMFA-531, he was assigned as the squadron operations officer, and also attended and graduated from the Marine Weapons & Tactics Instructor Course, and the United States Navy Fighter Weapons School (Top Gun). A 1987 graduate of the U.S. Naval Test Pilot School at Naval Air Station Patuxent River, Maryland, he was a test pilot under instruction when advised of his selection to the astronaut program. He logged over 6,000 flight hours in more than 30 different aircraft.

=== NASA experience ===
Selected by NASA in June 1987, Allen became an astronaut in August 1988. His technical assignments have included: Astronaut Office representative for all Space Shuttle issues related to landing sites, landing and deceleration hardware, including improvements to nosewheel steering, brakes and tires, and drag chute design; Shuttle Avionics Integration Laboratory (SAIL), which oversees, checks, and verifies all Shuttle flight control software and avionics programs; Technical Assistant to the Flight Crew Operations Director who is responsible for and manages all flight crew operations and support; lead of the Astronaut Support Personnel team which oversee Shuttle test, checkout, and preparation at the Kennedy Space Center; Special Assistant to the Director of the Johnson Space Center in Houston, Texas; lead of a Functional Workforce Review at the Kennedy Space Center, Florida, to determine minimal workforce and management structure requirements which allow maximum budget reductions while safely continuing Shuttle Flight Operations; Director of Space Station Requirements at NASA Headquarters, responsible for the International Space Station requirements, policies, external communications and liaison with Congress, international partners, and industry. A veteran of three space flights, Allen has logged over 900 hours in space. He was the pilot on STS-46 in 1992 and STS-62 in 1994, and was mission commander on STS-75 in 1996.

=== Spaceflight experience ===
==== STS-46 ====
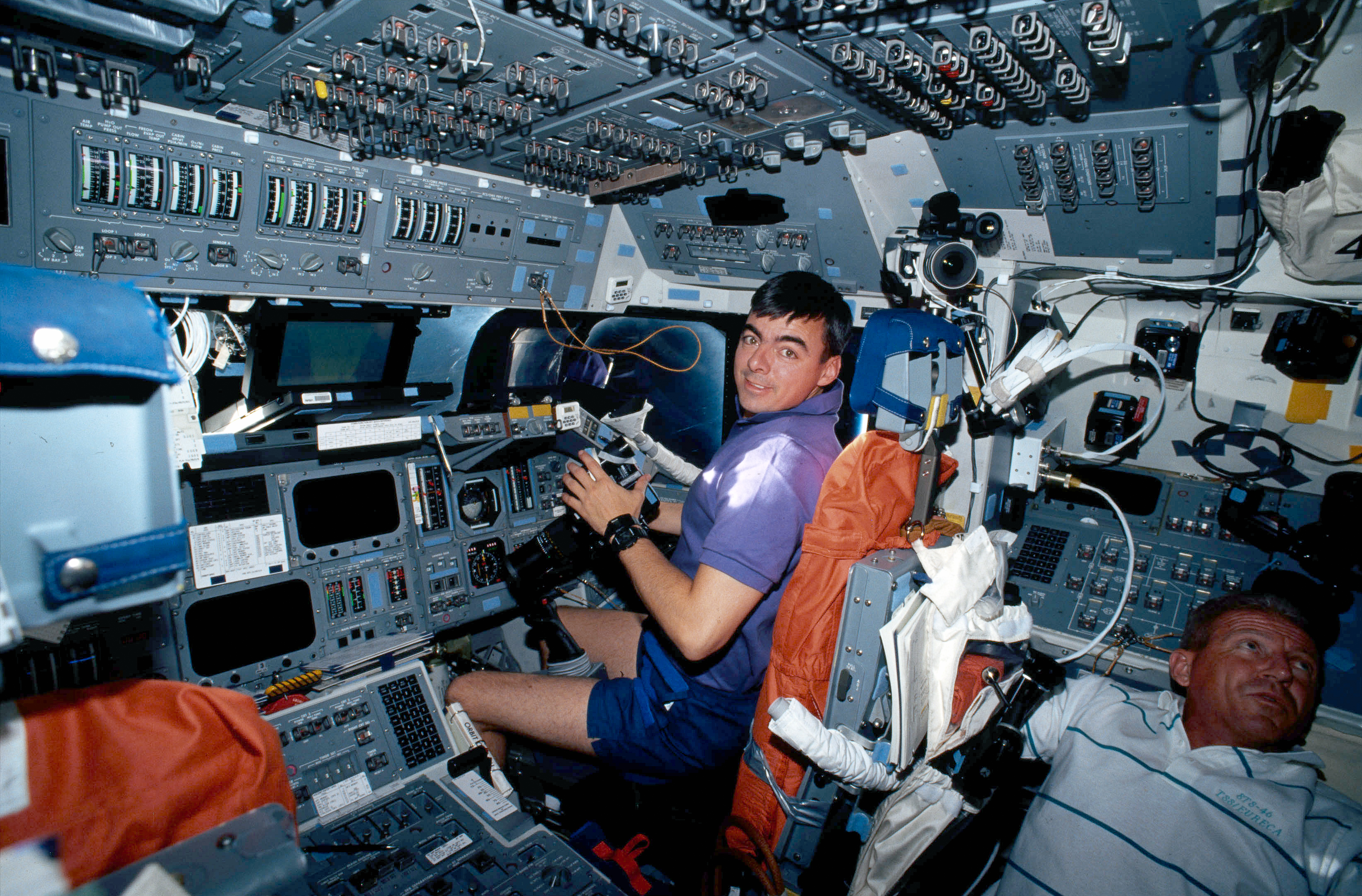
Allen on the flight deck of Atlantis during STS-46

STS-46 was an 8-day mission aboard the Space Shuttle Atlantis which featured the deployment of the European Retrievable Carrier (EURECA), an ESA-sponsored free-flying science platform, and demonstrated the Tethered Satellite System (TSS), a joint project between NASA and the Italian Space Agency. STS-46 launched July 31, 1992, and landed at the Kennedy Space Center, Florida, on August 8, 1992. The flight completed 126 orbits covering 3.3 million miles in 191.3 hours.

==== STS-62 ====
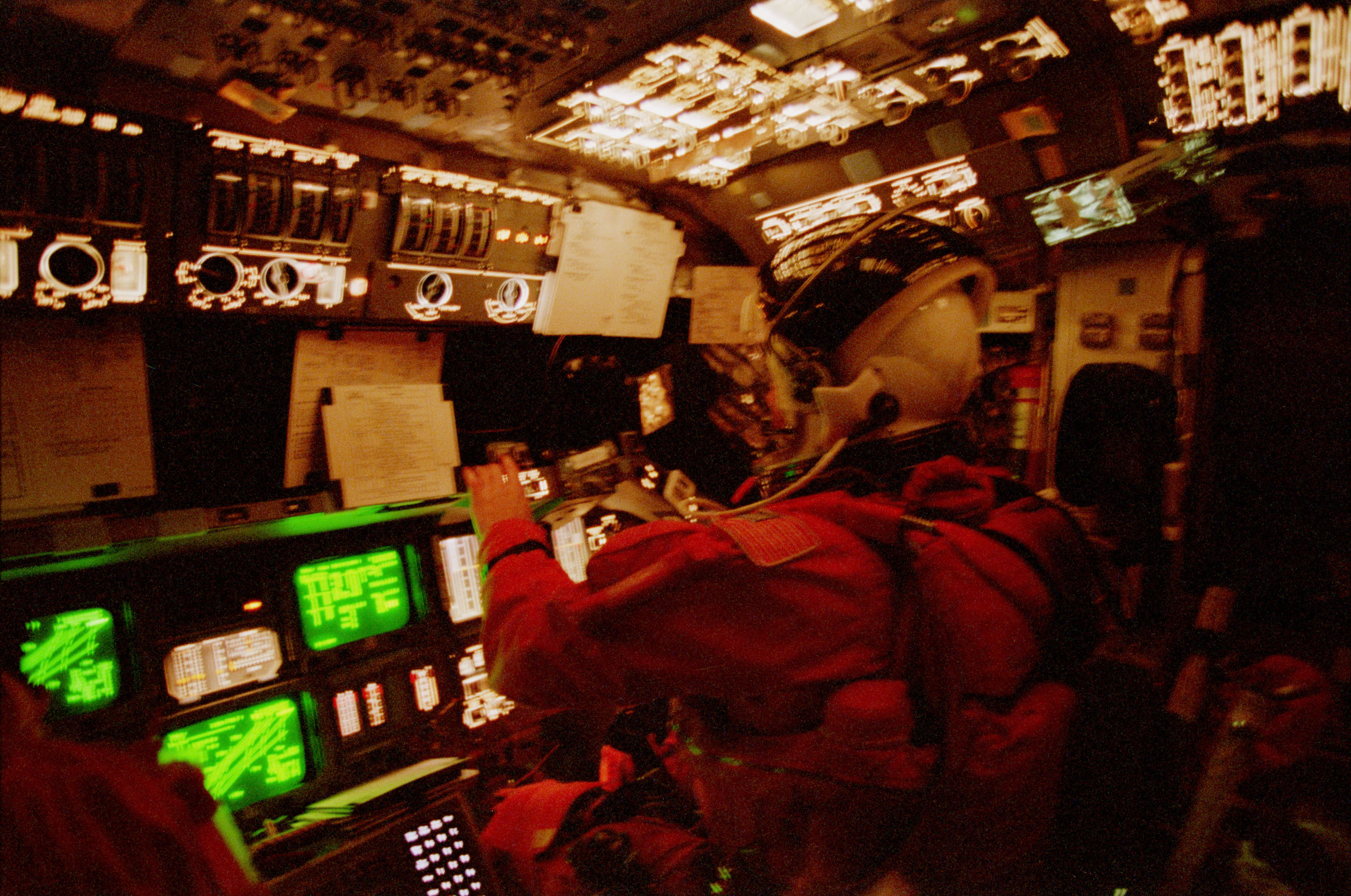
Allen on the flight deck of Columbia during reentry of STS-62

STS-62 was a 14-day mission aboard the Space Shuttle Columbia which consisted of 5 crewmembers that conducted a broad range of science and technology experiments with Earth applications to materials processing, biotechnology, advanced technology, and environmental monitoring. Principal payloads of the mission were the United States Microgravity Payload 2 (USMP-2) and the Office of Aeronautics and Space Technology 2 (OAST-2) package. STS-62 launched March 4, 1994, and landed at the Kennedy Space Center, Florida, on March 18, 1994. The flight completed 224 orbits covering 5.8 million miles in 335.3 hours.

==== STS-75 ====
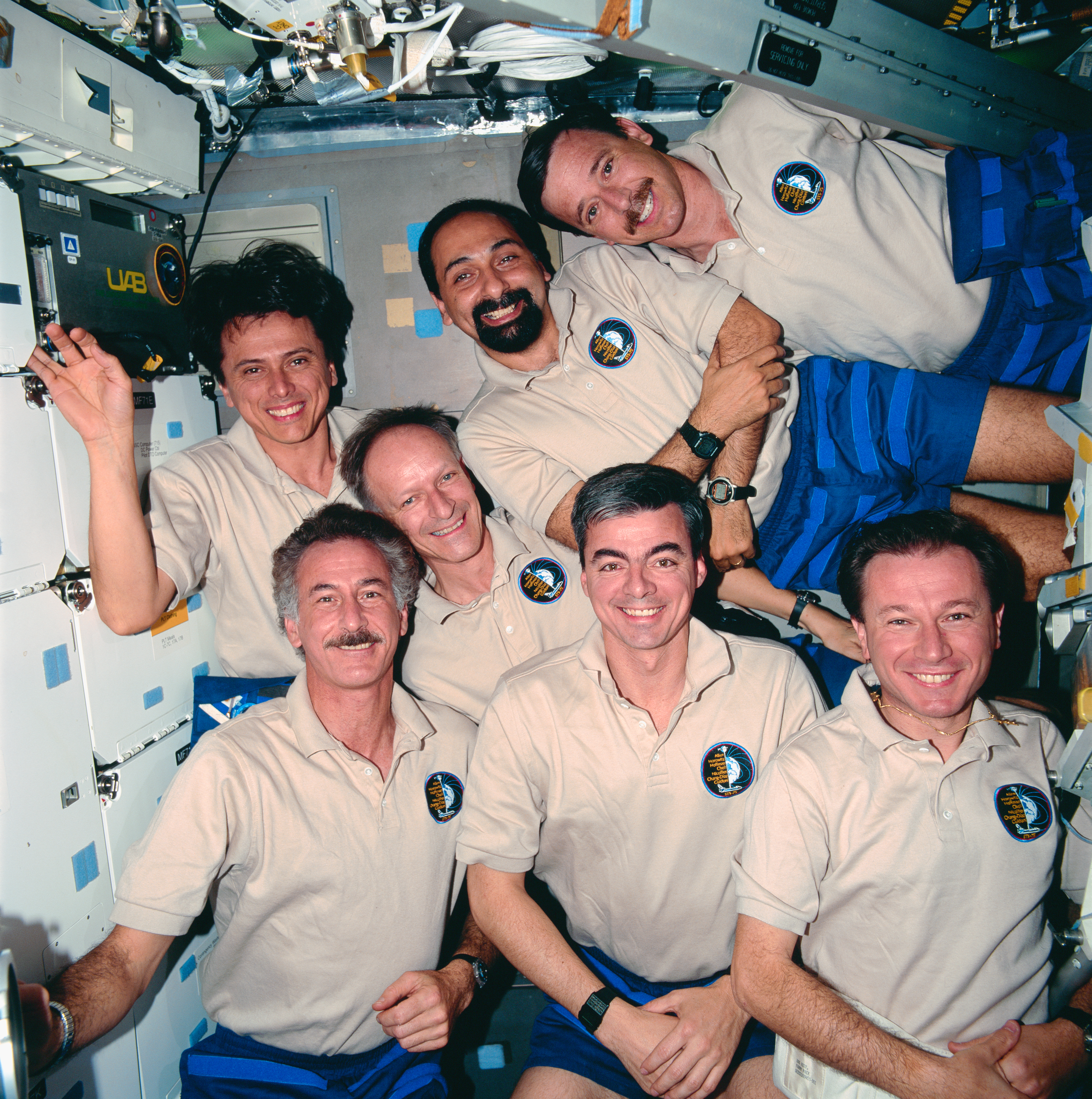
Allen (bottom-center) and the crew of STS-75 during the flight

STS-75 was a 16-day mission aboard the Space Shuttle Columbia with principal payloads being the reflight of the Tethered Satellite System (TSS) and the third flight of the United States Microgravity Payload (USMP-3). The TSS successfully demonstrated the ability of tethers to produce electricity. The TSS experiment produced a wealth of new information on the electrodynamics of tethers and plasma physics before the tether broke at 19.7 km, just shy of the 20.7 km goal. The crew also worked around the clock performing combustion experiments and research related to USMP-3 microgravity investigations used to improve production of medicines, metal alloys, and semiconductors. STS-75 launched on February 22 and landed on March 9, 1996. The mission was completed in 252 orbits covering 6.5 million miles in 377 hours and 40 minutes.

=== Aerodyne Industries ===
Allen retired from the Marine Corps and left NASA in October 1997, and is now CEO of Aerodyne Industries in Cape Canaveral, Florida. The company was founded in 1968 by his father Dr. Charles Allen.

== Awards and recognition ==
In 2017, Allen was recognized by the National Space Club's Florida Committee with the Dr. Kurt Debus Award.

In 2022, he was named "Entrepreneur of The Year 2022 Florida Award" by Ernst & Young.

In the spring of 2023, Allen was featured in Space Coast Living magazine, while Embraer included an interview with him in their trade journal, Advantage. and an accompanying video on YouTube.

Allen has also received the Defense Superior Service Medal, Legion of Merit, Distinguished Flying Cross, NASA Outstanding Leadership Medal, and NASA Exceptional Service Medal.
