= Charles D. Gemar =

American astronaut and lieutenant colonel (born 1955)

Sam Gemar
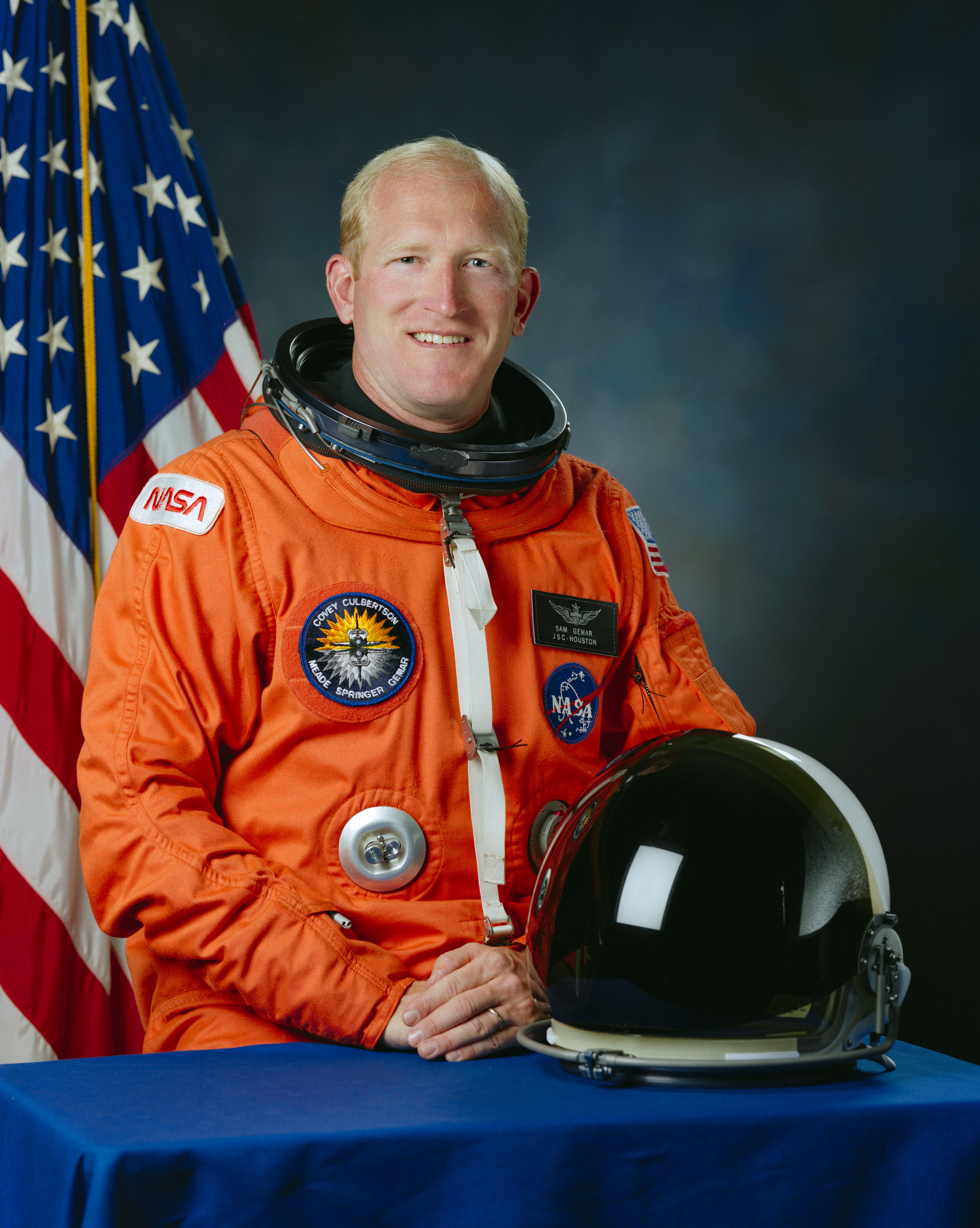
- Born: Charles Donald Gemar; August 4, 1955 (age 71); Yankton, South Dakota, U.S.
- Education: United States Military Academy (BS)
- Space career

NASA astronaut
- Rank: Lieutenant colonel, USA
- Time in space: 24d 5h 38m
- Selection: NASA Group 11 (1985)
- Missions: STS-38; STS-48; STS-62
- Retired: 1996

Charles Donald "Sam" Gemar (born August 4, 1955) is an American former astronaut with NASA and a lieutenant colonel in the United States Army. Gemar has flown on three Space Shuttle missions (STS-38, STS-48 and STS-62). Gemar has completed 385 orbits of the Earth and over 581 hours in space. He has also served in different positions in NASA, including as a CAPCOM for Shuttle missions. Gemar was the first astronaut to be born in the state of South Dakota.

== Experience ==
Born August 4, 1955, in Yankton, South Dakota, Gemar enlisted in the U.S. Army in January 1973 and reported for duty on June 11, 1973, following graduation from Scotland Public High School, Scotland, South Dakota. In November 1973, he was assigned to the XVIII Airborne Corps at Fort Bragg, North Carolina, where he received an appointment to the U.S. Military Academy Preparatory School at Fort Belvoir, Virginia, and later a Department of the Army appointment to join the United States Military Academy Class of 1979.

After graduating with a Bachelor of Science degree in engineering, he attended the Infantry Officers Basic Course at Fort Benning, Georgia, the Initial Entry Rotary Wing Aviation Course and the Fixed Wing Multi-Engine Aviators Course, both at Fort Rucker, Alabama. In October 1980, he transferred to the 24th Infantry Division, Fort Stewart, Georgia, where he remained until January 1, 1985. While at Fort Stewart/Hunter Army Airfield, he served as an assistant flight operations officer and flight platoon leader for the 24th Combat Aviation Battalion, commander of Wright Army Airfield, and chief of Operations Branch, for Hunter Army Airfield.

Other military schools completed include the Army Parachutist Course, Ranger School, and the Aviation Officers Advanced Course.

His hobbies include: water sports, jogging, woodworking, traveling.

== NASA experience ==
Selected by NASA in June 1985, Gemar completed a one-year training and evaluation program and became an astronaut in July 1986. He is qualified for assignment as a mission specialist on future Space Shuttle flight crews. Since then he has held a variety of technical assignments in support of the Space Shuttle Program, including flight software testing in the Shuttle Avionics Integration Laboratory (SAIL); launch support activities at the Kennedy Space Center; spacecraft communicator (CAPCOM) in mission control during Space Shuttle missions; Chief of Astronaut Appearances. Gemar has flown three times and has logged over 580 hours in space. He flew on STS-38 (November 15–20, 1990), STS-48 (September 12–18, 1991), and STS-62 (March 4–18, 1994).

On his first mission, Gemar served on the five-man crew of STS-38 which launched at night from the Kennedy Space Center, Florida, on November 15, 1990. During the five-day mission crew members conducted Department of Defense operations. After 80 orbits of the Earth in 117 hours, in the first Shuttle recovery in Florida since 1985, Space Shuttle Atlantis and her crew landed back at the Kennedy Space Center on November 20, 1990.

Gemar then served on the five-man crew of STS-48 aboard the Space Shuttle Discovery, which launched from the Kennedy Space Center, Florida, on September 12, 1991. During 81 orbits of the Earth, the crew successfully deployed the Upper Atmosphere Research Satellite (UARS), designed to study the Earth's upper atmosphere on a global scale thus providing scientists with their first complete data set on the upper atmosphere's chemistry, winds and energy inputs, in addition to conducting numerous secondary experiments ranging from growing protein crystals, to studying how fluids and structures react in weightlessness. This five-day mission concluded with a landing at Edwards Air Force Base, California, on September 18, 1991. Mission duration was 128 hours.

Gemar's most recent mission was STS-62 aboard the Space Shuttle Columbia, which launched from the Kennedy Space Center, Florida, on March 4, 1994. This microgravity science and technology demonstration mission carried the United States Microgravity Payload (USMP-2) and the Office of Aeronautics and Space Technology (OAST-2) payloads. Sixty experiments or investigations were conducted in many scientific and engineering disciplines including: materials science, human physiology, biotechnology, protein crystal growth, robotics, structural dynamics, atmospheric ozone monitoring and spacecraft glow. During the spacecraft glow investigation, Columbia's orbital altitude was lowered to 105 nautical miles (194 km), the lowest ever flown by a Space Shuttle. STS-62, the second longest Space Shuttle mission to date, concluded after 13 days, 23 hours, and 16 minutes, following 224 orbits of the Earth with a landing at the Kennedy Space Center on March 18, 1994, after traveling 5.8 million miles.

== Organizations ==
- United States Military Academy Association of Graduates
- Army Aviation Association of America
- Association of Space Explorers
- Mount Rushmore National Monument Preservation Society
- Nassau Bay Volunteer Fire Department

== Special honors ==
- Gemar was Distinguished Graduate of his class in Undergraduate Pilot Training, and Distinguished Graduate of his class in graduate fixed-wing and multi-engine pilot training
- Defense Superior Service Medal
- Defense Meritorious Service Medal
- Army Commendation Medal
- Army Achievement Medal
- Good Conduct Medal
- National Defense Service Medals (2)
- National Intelligence Medal of Achievement
- NASA Exceptional Achievement Medal
- NASA Space Flight Medals (3)
- Honorary Doctorate of Engineering from the South Dakota School of Mines and Technology
- Honorary Chair for Membership of the South Dakota Congress of Parents and Teachers
- Member of South Dakota Aviation Hall of Fame
- Recipient of South Dakota Newspaper Association 1993 Distinguished Service Award
