= STS-38 =

1990 American crewed spaceflight for the Department of Defense

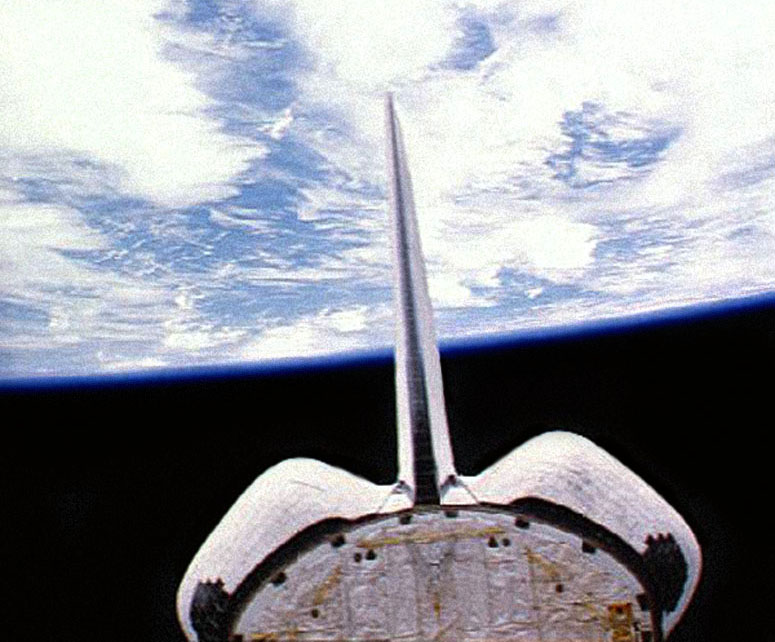
- Atlantis in orbit; in-flight photography of this Department of Defense support mission is limited
- Names: Space Transportation System-38
- Mission type: DoD satellite deployment
- Operator: NASA
- COSPAR ID: 1990-097A
- SATCAT no.: 20935
- Mission duration: 4 days, 21 hours, 54 minutes, 31 seconds
- Distance travelled: 3,291,199 km (2,045,056 mi)
- Orbits completed: 79

Spacecraft properties
- Spacecraft: Space Shuttle Atlantis
- Launch mass: 2,055,639 kg (4,531,908 lb)
- Landing mass: 86,677 kg (191,090 lb)
- Payload mass: (Classified)

Crew
- Crew size: 5
- Members: Richard O. Covey; Frank L. Culbertson Jr.; Carl J. Meade; Robert C. Springer; Charles D. Gemar

Start of mission
- Launch date: November 15, 1990, 23:48:15 UTC (6:48:15 pm EST)
- Launch site: Kennedy, LC-39A
- Contractor: Rockwell International

End of mission
- Landing date: November 20, 1990, 21:42:46 UTC (4:42:46 pm EST)
- Landing site: Kennedy, SLF Runway 33

Orbital parameters
- Reference system: Geocentric orbit
- Regime: Low Earth orbit
- Perigee altitude: 260 km (160 mi)
- Apogee altitude: 269 km (167 mi)
- Inclination: 28.45°
- Period: 89.79 minutes
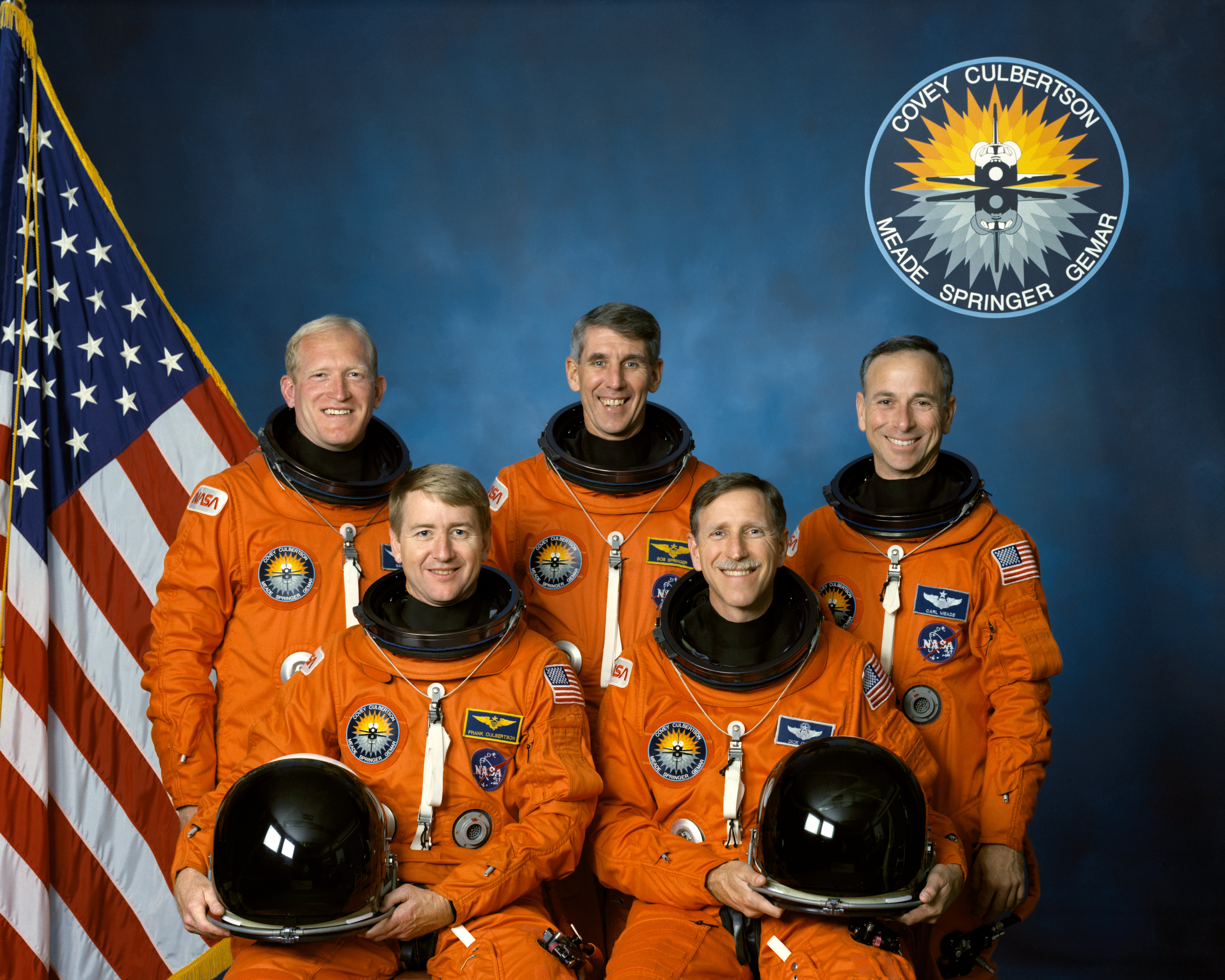
- STS-38 mission patch Standing: Gemar, Springer and Meade; Seated: Culbertson and Covey Space Shuttle program

STS-38 was a Space Shuttle mission by NASA using the Space Shuttle Atlantis. It was the 37th shuttle mission and carried a classified payload for the U.S. Department of Defense (DoD). It was the seventh flight for Atlantis and the seventh flight dedicated to the Department of Defense. The mission was a 4-day mission that traveled 3,291,199 km (2,045,056 mi) and completed 79 revolutions. Atlantis landed at Kennedy Space Center's Shuttle Landing Facility's runway 33. The launch was originally scheduled for July 1990 but was rescheduled due to a hydrogen leak found on Space Shuttle Columbia during the STS-35 countdown. During a rollback to the Orbiter Processing Facility Atlantis was damaged during a hail storm. The eventual launch date of November 15, 1990, was set due to a payload problem. The launch window was between 18:30 and 22:30 EST. The launch occurred at 18:48:13 EST. The mission ended with a landing at the Shuttle Landing Facility, marking the first time in five years that a mission returned to the Kennedy Space Center since STS-51-D. This also marked the first time Atlantis ended a mission at the Kennedy Space Center.

== Crew ==
Position	Astronaut
Commander	Richard O. Covey; Third spaceflight
Pilot	Frank L. Culbertson Jr. First spaceflight
Mission Specialist 1	Carl J. Meade; First spaceflight
Mission Specialist 2 Flight Engineer	Robert C. Springer; Second and last spaceflight
Mission Specialist 3	Charles D. Gemar; First spaceflight

=== Crew seat assignments ===
Seat	Launch	Landing	Seats 1–4 are on the flight deck. Seats 5–7 are on the mid-deck.
1	Covey		Seats 1–4 are on the flight deck. Seats 5–7 are on the mid-deck.
2	Culbertson		Seats 1–4 are on the flight deck. Seats 5–7 are on the mid-deck.
3	Meade	Gemar	Seats 1–4 are on the flight deck. Seats 5–7 are on the mid-deck.
4	Springer		Seats 1–4 are on the flight deck. Seats 5–7 are on the mid-deck.
5	Gemar	Meade	Seats 1–4 are on the flight deck. Seats 5–7 are on the mid-deck.
6	Unused		Seats 1–4 are on the flight deck. Seats 5–7 are on the mid-deck.
7	Unused		Seats 1–4 are on the flight deck. Seats 5–7 are on the mid-deck.

== Preparations and launch ==
The launch occurred on November 15, 1990, 18:48:13 EST. It was originally scheduled for July 9, 1990, however, a liquid hydrogen leak found on Columbia during the STS-35 countdown prompted three precautionary tanking tests on Atlantis at the pad on June 29, 1990, on July 13, and on July 25, 1990. Tests confirmed the hydrogen fuel leak on the external tank side of the external tank/orbiter 43.2 cm (17.0 in) quick disconnect umbilical. This could not be repaired at the pad and Atlantis was rolled back to the VAB on August 9, 1990, demated, then transferred to the Orbiter Processing Facility (OPF). During rollback, the vehicle remained parked outside the VAB for about a day while the Columbia/STS-35 stack was transferred to the pad for launch. While outside, Atlantis suffered minor hail damage to its tiles during a thunderstorm. After repairs were made in the OPF, Atlantis was transferred to the VAB for mating on October 2, 1990. During hoisting operations, the platform beam that was to have been removed from the orbiter's aft compartment fell and caused minor damage, which was repaired. The vehicle rolled out to Pad A on October 12, 1990. The fourth mini-tanking test was performed on October 24, 1990, with no excessive hydrogen or oxygen leakage detected. During the Flight Readiness Review (FRR), the launch date was set for November 9, 1990. The launch was reset for November 15 due to payload problems. Liftoff occurred during a classified launch window lying within a launch period extending from 18:30 to 22:30 EST on November 15, 1990.

== Classified payload ==
According to Aviation Week, the shuttle initially entered a 204 km (127 mi) x 519 km (322 mi) orbit at an inclination of 28.45° to the equator. It then executed three orbital maneuvering system (OMS) burns, the last on orbit #4. The first of these circularized the orbit at 519 km (322 mi).

The first classified payload was code-named USA-67, which was deployed from Atlantis' cargo bay on the seventh orbit and ignited its rocket motor at the ascending node of the eighth orbit to place it in a geostationary transfer orbit (GTO). Aviation Week reported that USA-67 was a secret ELINT gathering satellite headed for geosynchronous orbit and launched to monitor the events during the first Gulf War in 1990. As a result of there being two upper stages aboard STS-38, USA-67 was originally believed to be a Magnum satellite like those deployed on STS-51-C and STS-33, which were launched via a two-stage Inertial Upper Stage (IUS). Today it is believed that USA-67 was instead a secret Satellite Data System (SDS-2) military communications satellite, like those deployed on STS-28 and STS-53.

It is also believed that USA-67 was not the only satellite deployed during STS-38. A publicly released image of Atlantis' vertical stabilizer and upper aft bulkhead, similar to the one released from STS-53, confirms that the ASE (Airborne Support Equipment) for the Inertial Upper Stage (IUS) was absent from this flight. An explanation is that two separate satellites were deployed, using single-stage Payload Assist Module (PAM-D). Rumors that appear to have been substantiated by the identification of an "unknown" geostationary satellite by amateur observers insist that the second payload was a stealth satellite known as Prowler, reportedly intended to covertly inspect other nation's geostationary satellites.

== Landing ==
The mission was extended by one day due to unacceptable crosswinds at the planned landing site of Edwards Air Force Base. Continued adverse conditions led to a decision to shift the landing to the Shuttle Landing Facility (SLF) at the Kennedy Space Center. The SLF had not been used by a returning shuttle mission in five years, since STS-51-D when Discovery suffered extensive brake damage and a ruptured tire during landing. Landing occurred on November 20, 1990, at 21:42:46 UTC (4:42:42 pm EST, local time). The orbiter rolled down Runway 33 for 2,753 m (9,032 ft) and 57 seconds. STS-38 marked the first KSC landing for Atlantis, weighing 86,677 kg (191,090 lb) at landing.

== Gallery ==
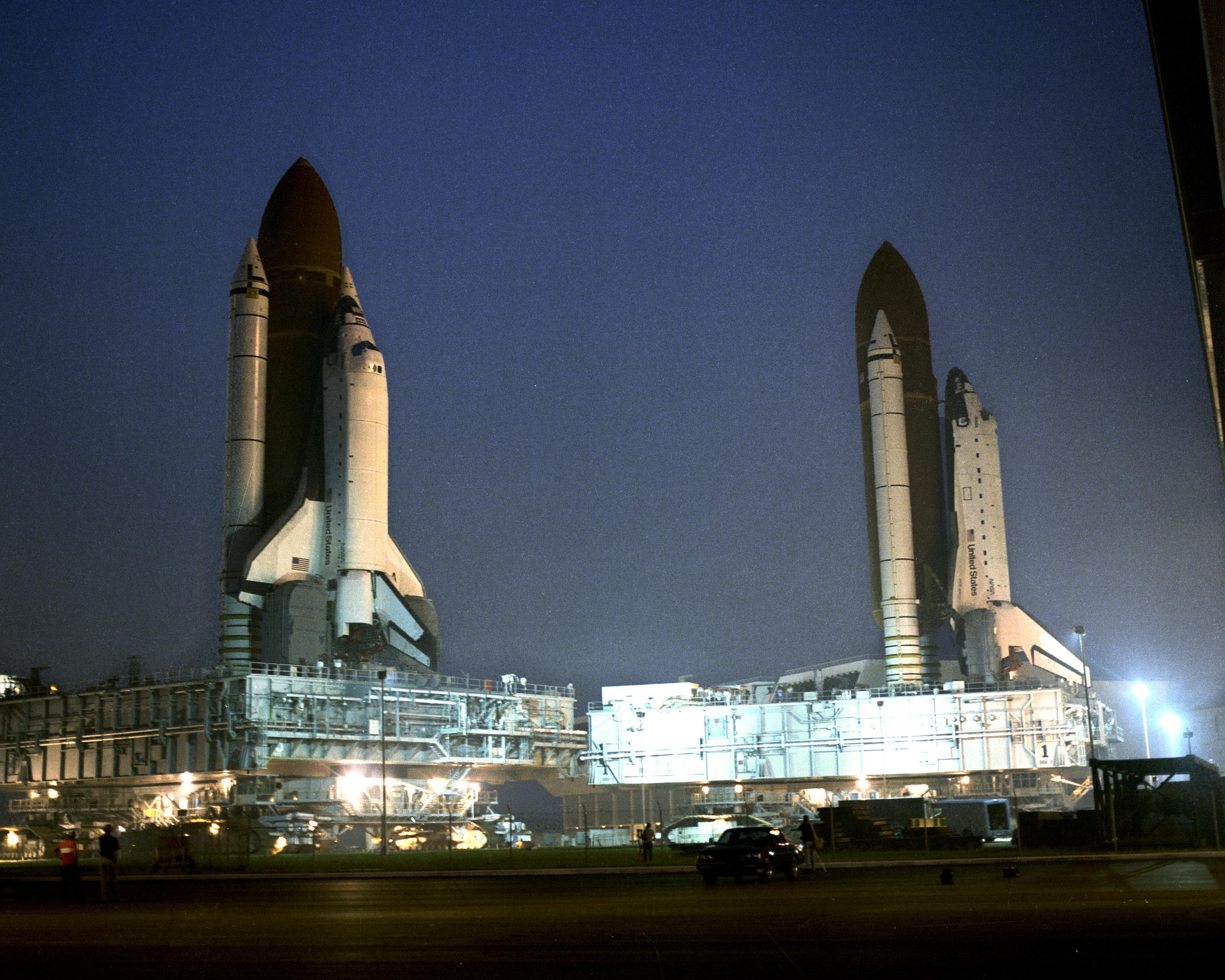
Atlantis (right) and Columbia pass

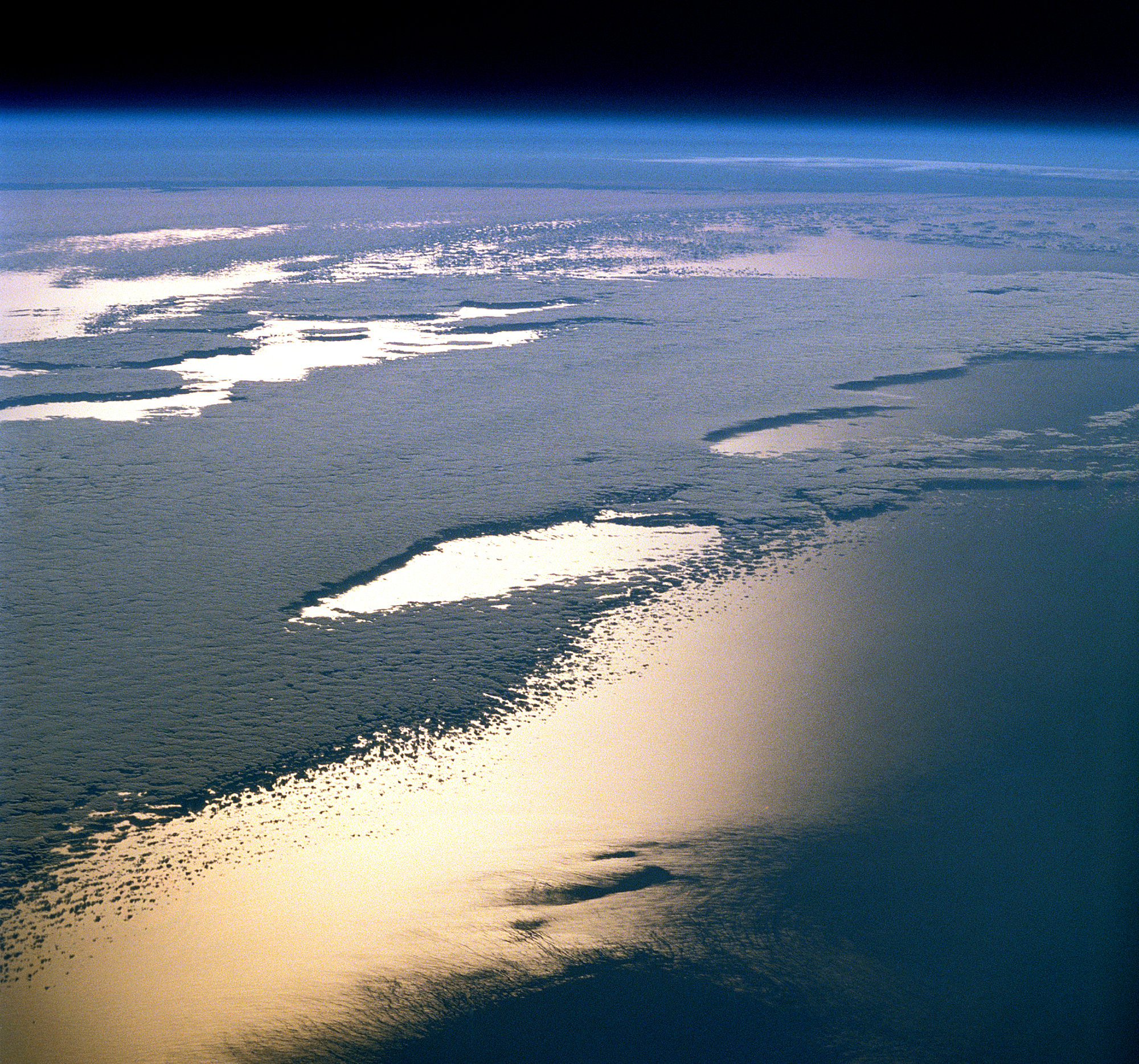
Sunlight on the ocean

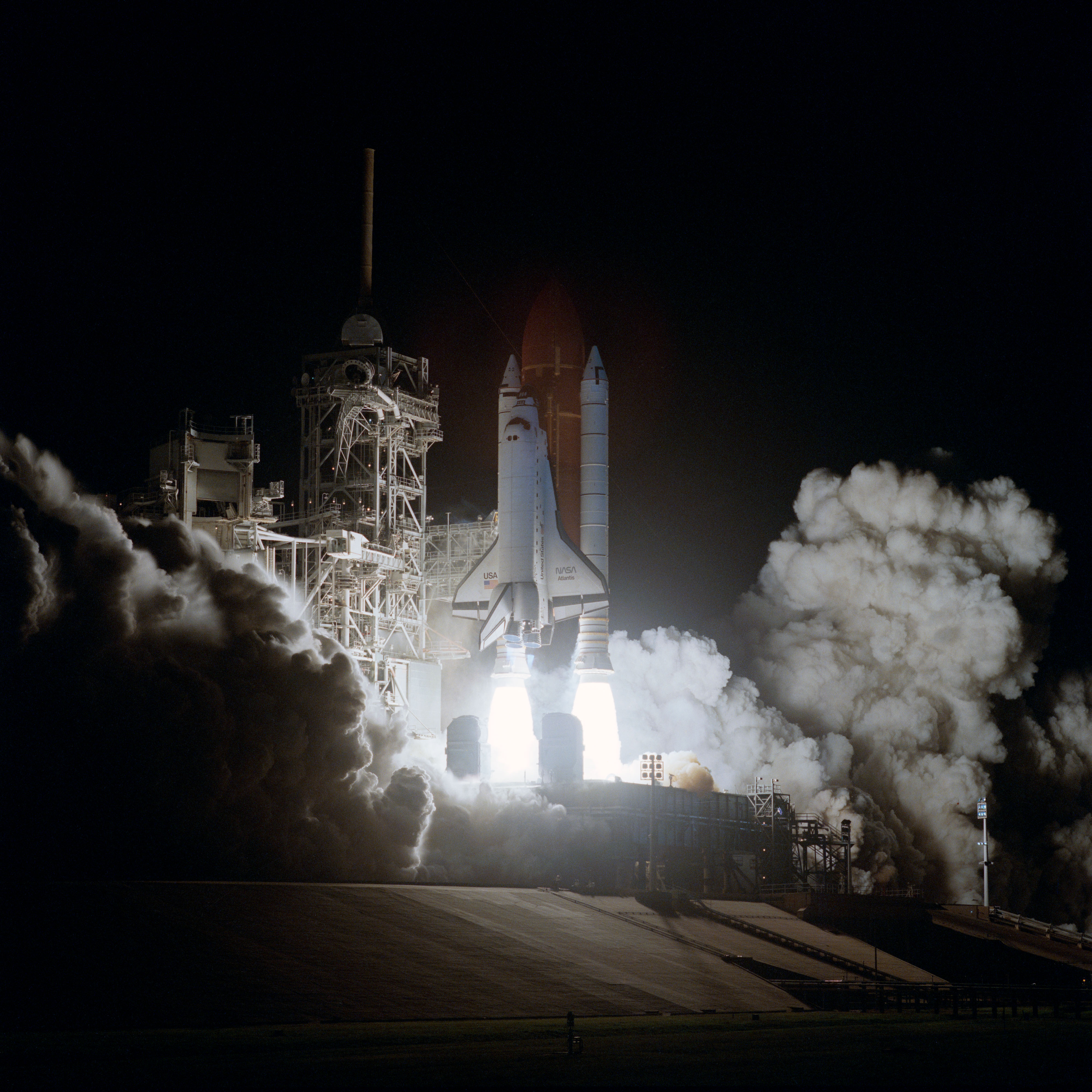
Launch of STS-38

== See also ==
- List of human spaceflights
- List of Space Shuttle missions
- Militarization of space
