= STS-62 =

1994 American crewed spaceflight

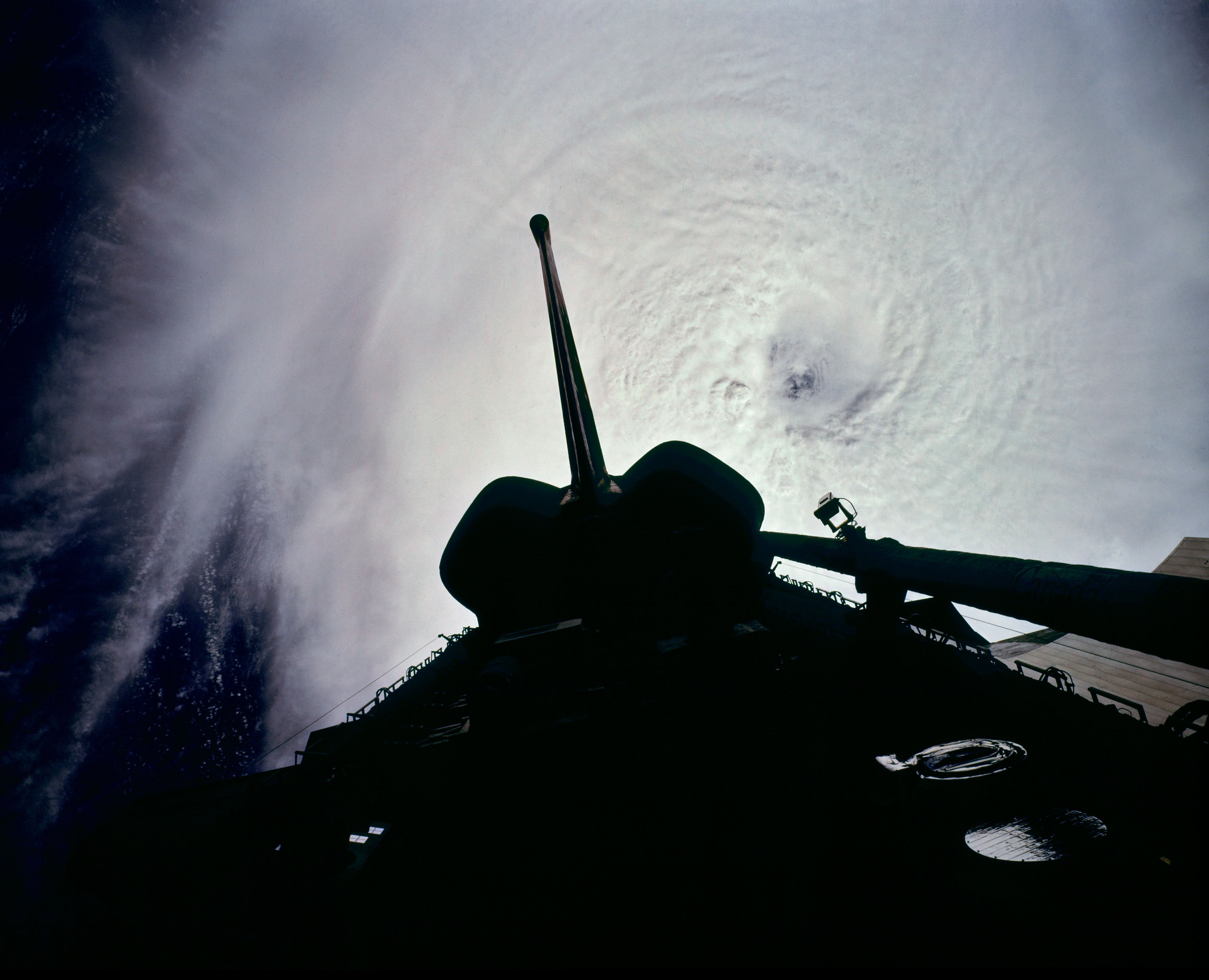
- Columbia passes over Typhoon Owen.
- Names: Space Transportation System-62
- Mission type: Microgravity research
- Operator: NASA
- COSPAR ID: 1994-015A
- SATCAT no.: 23025
- Mission duration: 13 days, 23 hours, 16 minutes, 41 seconds
- Distance travelled: 9,366,617 kilometres (5,820,146 mi)
- Orbits completed: 224

Spacecraft properties
- Spacecraft: Space Shuttle Columbia
- Landing mass: 102,861 kilograms (226,770 lb)
- Payload mass: 8,759 kilograms (19,310 lb)

Crew
- Crew size: 5
- Members: John H. Casper; Andrew M. Allen; Pierre J. Thuot; Charles D. Gemar; Marsha S. Ivins

Start of mission
- Launch date: 4 March 1994, 13:53:01 UTC
- Launch site: Kennedy, LC-39B

End of mission
- Landing date: 18 March 1994, 13:10:42 UTC
- Landing site: Kennedy, SLF Runway 33

Orbital parameters
- Reference system: Geocentric
- Regime: Low Earth
- Perigee altitude: 296 kilometres (184 mi)
- Apogee altitude: 309 kilometres (192 mi)
- Inclination: 39.00 degrees
- Period: 90.4 minutes
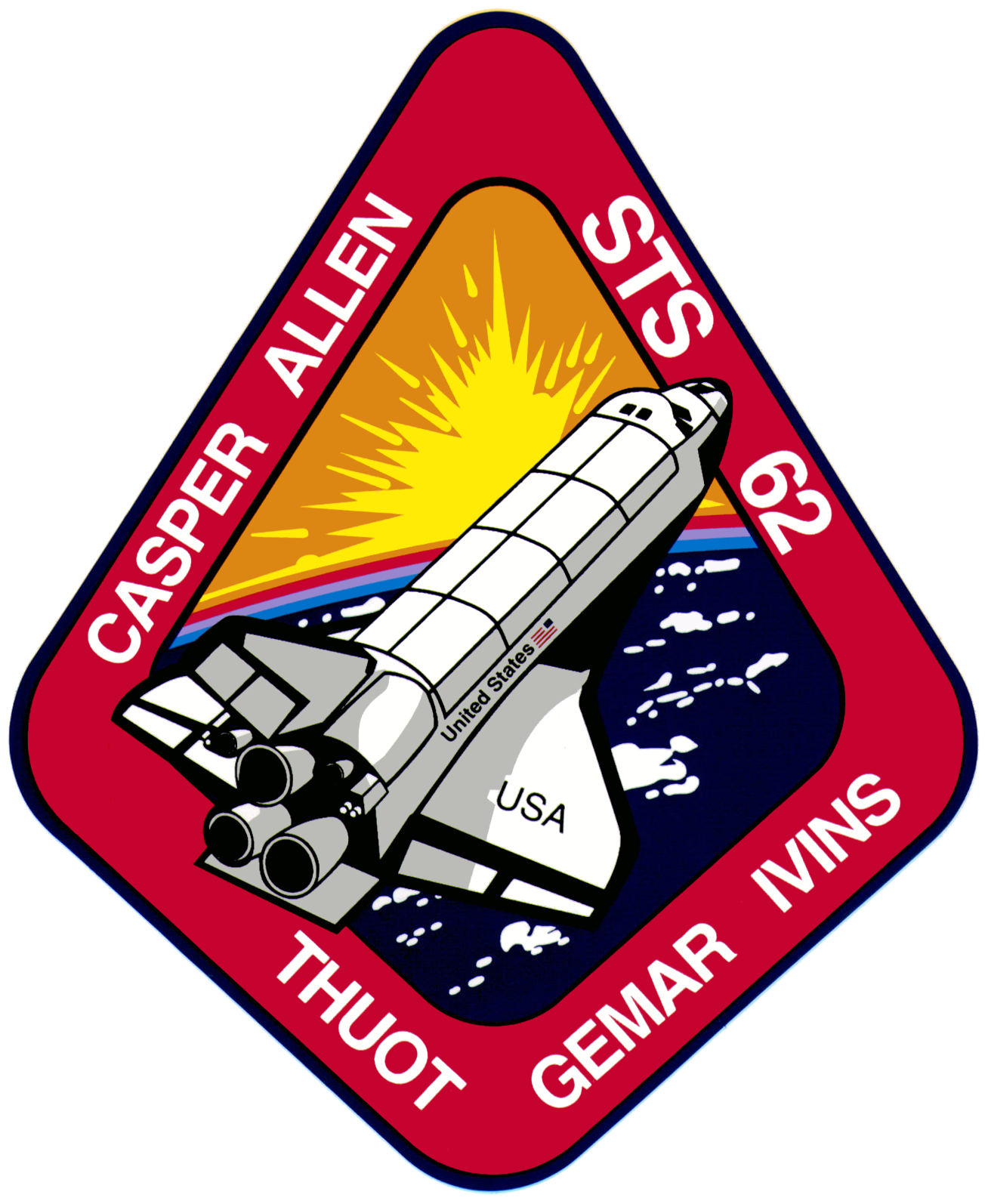
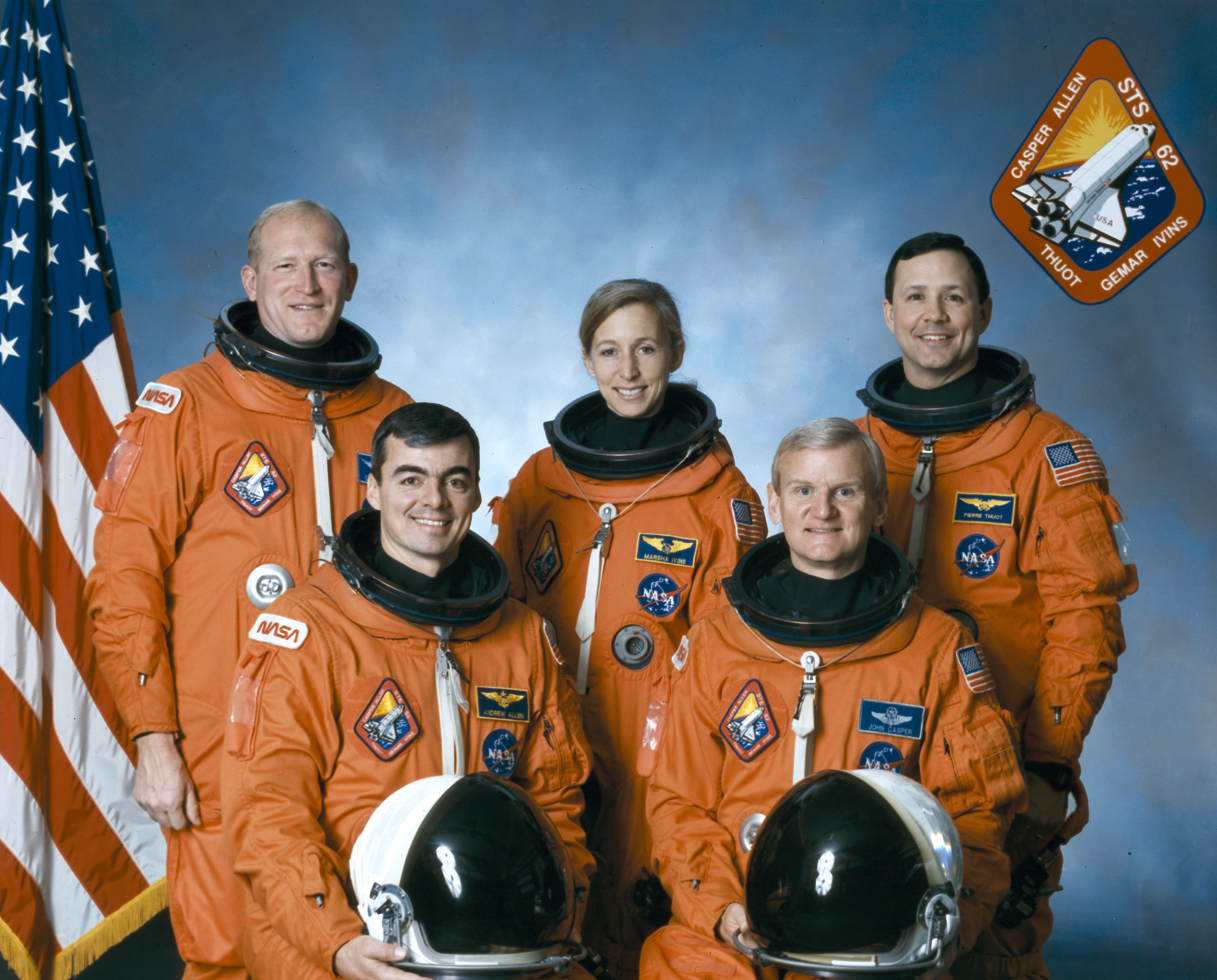
- Left to right - Standing: Gemar, Ivins, Thuot; Seated: Allen, Casper Space Shuttle program

STS-62 was a Space Shuttle program mission flown aboard Space Shuttle Columbia. The primary payloads were the USMP-02 microgravity experiments package and the OAST-2 engineering and technology payload, both in the orbiter's cargo bay. The two-week mission also featured a number of biomedical experiments focusing on the effects of long duration spaceflight. The landing was chronicled by the 1994 Discovery Channel special about the Space Shuttle program and served as the show's opening. A C.F. Martin backpacker guitar was also flown aboard Columbia during the mission.

== Crew ==
Position	Astronaut
Commander	John H. Casper; Third spaceflight
Pilot	Andrew M. Allen; Second spaceflight
Mission Specialist 1	Pierre J. Thuot; Third and last spaceflight
Mission Specialist 2 Flight Engineer	Charles D. Gemar; Third and last spaceflight
Mission Specialist 3	Marsha S. Ivins; Third spaceflight

=== Crew seat assignments ===
Seat	Launch	Landing	Seats 1–4 are on the flight deck. Seats 5–7 are on the mid-deck.
1	Casper		Seats 1–4 are on the flight deck. Seats 5–7 are on the mid-deck.
2	Allen		Seats 1–4 are on the flight deck. Seats 5–7 are on the mid-deck.
3	Thuot	Ivins	Seats 1–4 are on the flight deck. Seats 5–7 are on the mid-deck.
4	Gemar		Seats 1–4 are on the flight deck. Seats 5–7 are on the mid-deck.
5	Ivins	Thuot	Seats 1–4 are on the flight deck. Seats 5–7 are on the mid-deck.
6	Unused		Seats 1–4 are on the flight deck. Seats 5–7 are on the mid-deck.
7	Unused		Seats 1–4 are on the flight deck. Seats 5–7 are on the mid-deck.

== Mission highlights ==
=== Day 1 ===
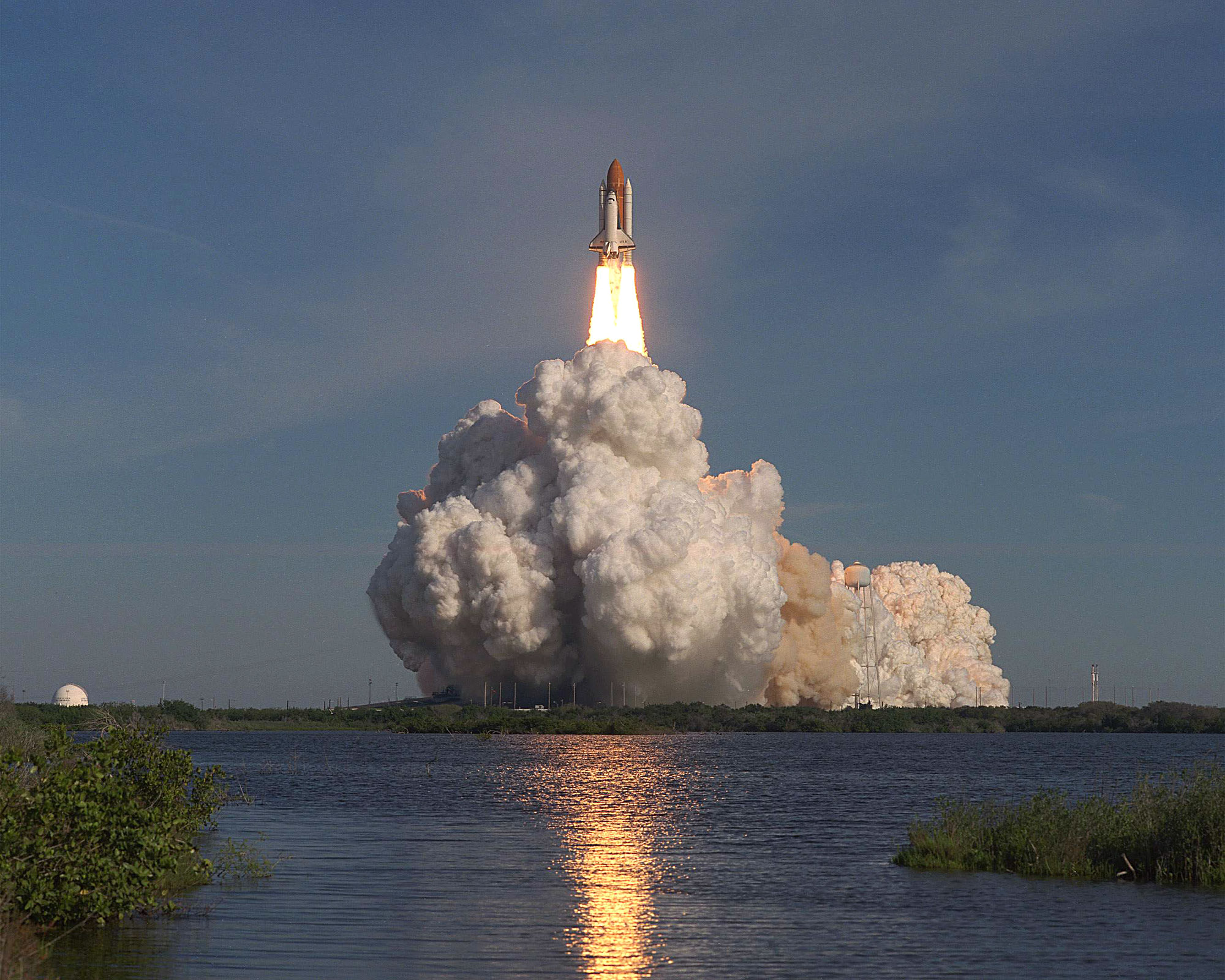
Liftoff of Columbia on STS-62.

Flight Day One (Friday, March 4) consisted of ascent operations and reconfiguration of the orbiter in order to support orbital operations, an OMS-2 burn to circularize Columbia's orbit to a 160-by-163-nautical-mile (296 by 302 km) orbit, USMP-2 activation, PSE operations, APCG activation, CPCG operations, RMS checkout, DEE operations, CGBA activation. The payload bay doors were opened at 10:26 am EDT.

=== Day 2 ===
On Flight Day Two (Saturday, March 5), the astronauts took turns on the crew cabin exercise facility in an effort to slow down the effects of muscle atrophy. Pilot Andrew M. Allen and mission specialist Charles D. Gemar also spent time in the Lower Body Negative Pressure Container. Mission specialists Pierre J. Thuot and Marsha S. Ivins started the Protein Crystal Growth Experiment (PCGE) and the Physiological Systems Experiment (PSE), while scientists on the ground in the Payload Operations Control Center controlled eleven other experiments mounted in the orbiter's payload bay. Mission controllers in Houston also investigated a problem in a fuel line pressure sensor on one of Columbia's three Auxiliary Power Units (APUs). Higher than normal pressures were detected and then returned to normal after engineers powered up heaters on the unit. The APUs provided hydraulic power to operate key landing systems and only one of the three was needed for a successful landing. However, flight rules called for a shortened mission in the event a single unit was lost.

=== Day 3 ===
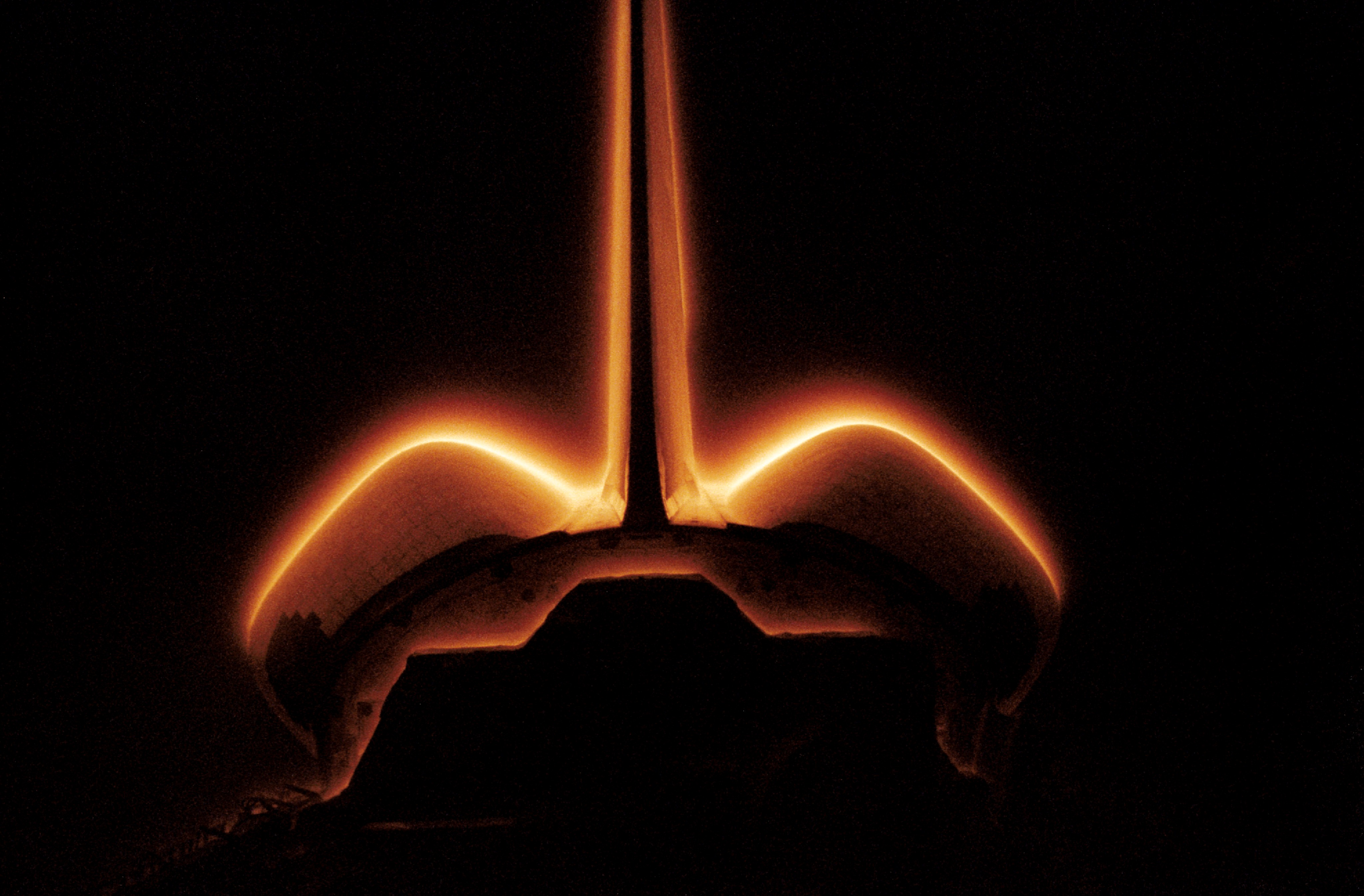
Shuttle glow phenomena lights up the orbiter's tail.

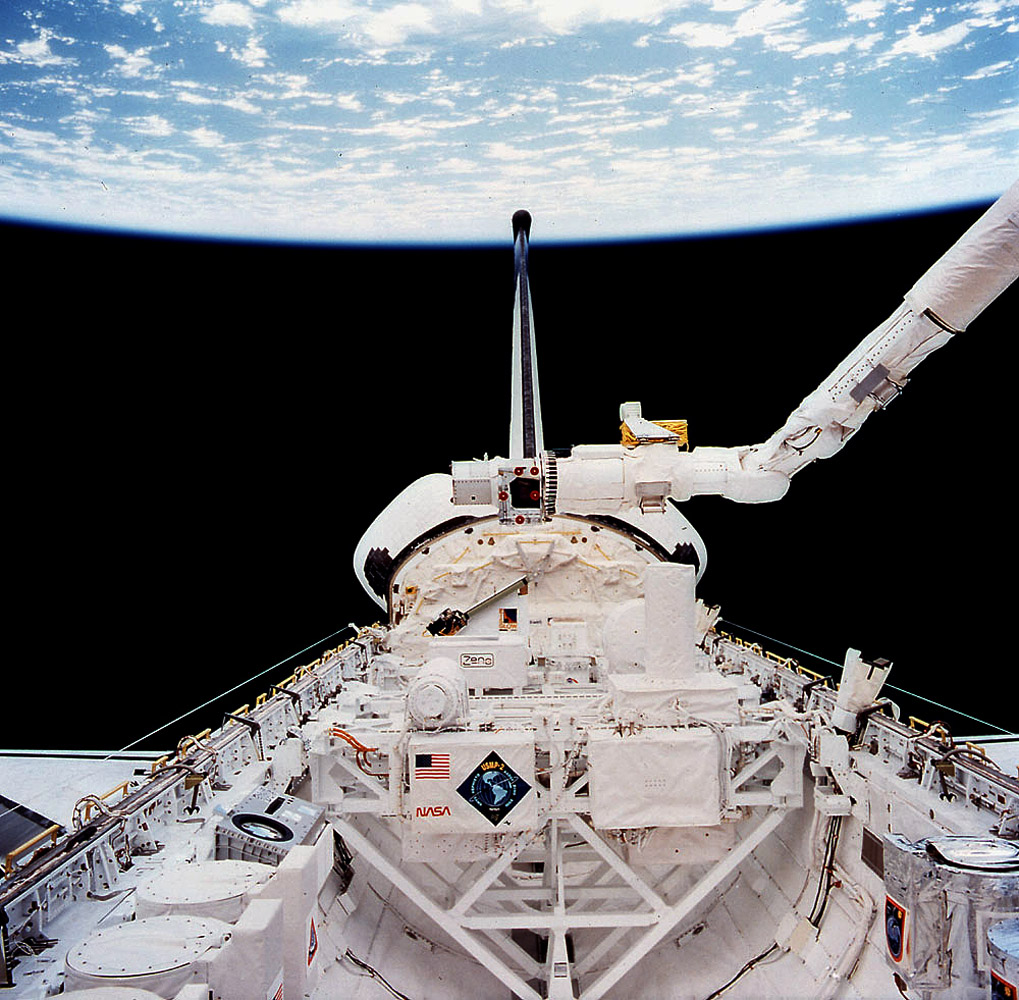
Experiments in Columbia's payload bay

On Flight Day Three (Sunday, March 6), following a morning of medical studies, the crew spent the last half of the day exercising and continuing to study the behavior of a space station truss model in weightlessness. Pilot Allen and mission specialists Ivins and Gemar each took a turn on a stationary bicycle mounted in Columbia's middeck. The stationary bike had long been a staple of shuttle flights to allow exercise that countered the effect of weightlessness on the muscles. The bike aboard Columbia, however, featured a new mounting system of shock-absorbing springs that was evaluated as a method of keeping vibrations from exercise, which could disturb sensitive experiments, to a minimum.

Also, Gemar set up a model of a scaffold-like truss structure that could be applied to a future space station design in the lower deck. The model, linked to sensitive recorders in a shuttle locker, was used to determine the characteristics of such structures in orbit. The model and its reactions were studied in several different configurations during the day.

Other activities for the crew included photography of the glow created as the orbiter's outer skin interacted with atomic oxygen in orbit, and continued monitoring of protein crystal growth experiments in the cabin.

Although not highly visible except to the Earth-bound scientists watching over them, Columbia's wide assortment of external payloads continued their investigations throughout the day. The second United States Microgravity Payload (USMP-2) experiments continued to produce a wealth of data for scientists on the ground.

The Critical Fluid Light Scattering Experiment, or ZENO, science team reported that they expected to locate the critical temperature of xenon at "any time." Team members closely watched computer data traces which indicate their experiment was very near the critical temperature—the goal of a lengthy, methodical "sensitive" search process. This was a more precise search for the critical temperature after its location had been determined within a narrow band. Once the temperature was located, the team spent nearly 24 hours taking a good look at the phenomenon they waited years to see. They studied the properties of xenon at its critical point, taking subtle optical measurements in the region surrounding it. A fluid's "critical point" occurs at a condition of temperature and pressure where the fluid is simultaneously a gas and a liquid. By understanding how matter behaves at the critical point, scientists hope to gain a better insight into a variety of physics problems ranging from phase changes in fluids to changes in the composition and magnetic properties of solids.

The Space Acceleration Measurement System (SAMS) continued to measure the microgravity environment on the USMP-2 carrier in support of the four other experiments on board. The SAMS team began sending results of their data collection during various orbiter activities to the crew, as they were interested in how they could minimize their influence on the microgravity environment. Measurements were made with the system at specific times when microgravity disturbances were caused by events such as crew exercise and movement of the orbiter's K_{u}-band antenna. Such observations also collected "signatures" which the team were able to easily identify in future data.

A related system, the Orbital Acceleration Research Experiment (OARE), was managed by NASA's Johnson Space Center. It was useful on missions such as USMP-2 where it was important to accurately characterize a wide variety of disturbances in the microgravity environment. Working closely with SAMS, the OARE recorded any low-frequency activity such as the orbiter's friction with the rarefied upper atmosphere. SAMS was most suitable for recording higher-frequency activity such as crew exercise.

The Isothermal Dendritic Growth Experiment (IDGE) continued to assemble data to test theories concerning the effect of gravity-driven fluid flows on dendritic solidification of molten materials. Upon completion of its first phase of pre-programmed operations the previous night, the dendritic experiment entered its second phase of crystal growth when team members began sending commands to their experiment from the ground using a unique set of capabilities known as "telescience." This allowed them to get the best possible data from their investigation.

The Advanced Automated Directional Solidification Furnace (AADSF) studied the directional solidification of semiconductor materials in microgravity. Downlinked experiment data from the third day of the mission indicated that solidification of a crystal of mercury cadmium telluride took place, and the AADSF science team constantly monitored this slow but steady progress. Testing the AADSF in microgravity was beneficial because on Earth, gravity causes fluids to rise or fall within the melted portion; a warm liquid is less dense than a cool one and will rise to the top of the melt. These convective movements of molten material contribute to physical flaws in the internal structure of the growing crystal. Such flaws affect a crystal's overall electrical characteristics, and consequently, its usefulness in electronic devices.

The MEPHISTO team reported that they had gathered good data with their directional solidification furnace. During the day, the team troubleshooted a problem discovered on the previous night with a troublesome "Seebeck measurement." This electronic signal measured changes in the microstructure of a solidifying metal, and was conducted on one of three experiment samples of bismuth-tin. Other measurement techniques were used on the two remaining samples later in the mission; both these samples operated nominally.

Flight controllers had a quiet Sunday in Mission Control with no significant troubles seen aboard the spacecraft. A reading of high pressure that was seen in a fuel line to one of the shuttle's three auxiliary power units earlier in the flight had dissipated, and controllers became confident the APU would operate well if needed. However, they continued to closely watch the readings from that area. The crew began eight hours of sleep at 4:53 pm.

=== Day 4 ===
Flight Day 4 began on Monday, March 7 at 12:53 am. The crew started its day with a medley of armed forces anthems sung by the U.S. Military Academy Glee Club. The medley honored all four branches of the service which were represented by the STS-62 crew. During the time of the mission, Commander Casper was a colonel in the U.S. Air Force, Pilot Allen a major in the U.S. Marine Corps, mission specialist Gemar a lieutenant colonel in the U.S. Army, and mission specialist Thuot was a commander in the U.S. Navy.

After completing their post-sleep activities, the crew started the payload work for the day. The crew performed checks of the Protein Crystal Growth Experiment and the rodents that were housed in the middeck as part of the Physiological Systems Experiment. Gemar also continued his work with the Middeck 0-Gravity Dynamics Experiment, designed to study the fundamental, non-linear, gravity-dependent behavior of hybrid scaled structures. Understanding these structures became important for designers of large space structures such as the International Space Station.

Casper conducted a special presentation about the Space Acceleration Measurement System. A frequent flyer on the shuttle, SAMS used accelerometers to take measurements of on-board vibrations and accelerations. Such disturbances, though slight, could have affected the sensitive microgravity experiments. SAMS measurements allowed scientists to adjust their experiments to improve their scientific results.

Allen and Gemar got a half-day off from their busy schedule operating the many microgravity experiments on the mission. Due to the long duration of the mission, each crew member received two half-days off during the 14-day mission.

The other astronauts spent the first half of the day working with the Middeck 0-Gravity Dynamics Experiment, or MODE, and a model of a truss structure which was under consideration for use on a future space station. The truss model, set up to float free in the middeck, was analyzed to determine its behavior in weightlessness.

Around the clock, experiments with the U.S. Microgravity Payload-2, the Office of Aeronautics and Space Technology-2, the Space Shuttle Backscatter Ultraviolet instrument and the Limited Candidate Duration Materials Exposure experiments continued to operate, many of them being controlled by scientists on the ground. The SSBUV instrument operated since the first day of the flight, and plans were made by its ground controllers on Flight Day 4 to attempt to detect sulfur dioxide emissions from volcanoes in Central America. The objective of the observations by SSBUV were to investigate whether such emissions low in the atmosphere were detectable from orbit. SSBUV's measurements in general were used to fine-tune satellites that monitored the ozone and other gases in the Earth's atmosphere. The crew began its eight-hour sleep period at 4:53 pm EST.

During USMP-2 operations on Flight Day 4, the Critical Fluid Light Scattering Experiment, or ZENO, team reported overnight that they started seeing behavior in the fluid xenon unlike any they had seen on Earth. They believed this meant the experiment had passed through the xenon sample's critical point. Meanwhile, the team continued their delicate temperature manipulations in order to verify what they had seen. Once the team was certain they had located the critical point, they planned to conduct a series of precise measurements in the area surrounding it using laser light scattering. When xenon is at or extremely near its critical point—the point where it is simultaneously a liquid and a gas—patches of the otherwise clear substance briefly take on a "milky" iridescence. Closer to the critical point, the milky-white areas are larger and exist for longer periods. When a laser light is passed through the sample in these areas, fluctuations in the sample's density cause the light to be scattered.

Team members for the MEPHISTO furnace began running a series of metal solidification studies and received analyzable data. On Monday, the team made much progress in overcoming some difficulty they had been experiencing with one of the experiment's electronic measurements and successfully completed a Seebeck run. The Seebeck measurement is an electrical signal which measures temperature variations during crystal growth at the boundary where liquid becomes solid—the solidification front. MEPHISTO was used to conduct a series of melting and solidification cycles on three identical rod-shaped samples of a bismuth-tin alloy. During these runs, temperature, velocity and shape of the solidification front were measured in order to study the behavior of metals and semiconductors as they solidified.

Team members of the Isothermal Dendritic Growth Experiment (IDGE), said they were pleased with the performance of their apparatus and the data they acquired during USMP-2. While dendrite growth was taking place, two 35 mm cameras took photographs for post-mission analysis. When a dendrite growth cycle was completed, the small crystalline structure was re-melted and another grown at a different "supercooling" temperature. Dendrites were grown at 20 different levels of supercooling ranging up to approximately 1.3 degrees Celsius. Supercooling is the slow cooling of a liquid to below its normal freezing point, but due to its purity, does not solidify. The level of supercooling is determined by the difference between the temperature of the liquid and its normal freezing point. IDGE was a fundamental materials science experiment performed in the microgravity environment of space in order to increase understanding of the solidification processes.

The Advanced Automated Directional Solidification Furnace (AADSF) continued to operate smoothly, growing a single cylinder-shaped crystal of mercury cadmium telluride, an exotic material used as an infrared radiation detector. The AADSF provided scientists with a unique apparatus in which to test theories of semiconductor crystal growth without the effects and limitations caused by Earth's gravity. The information gained by growing crystals of a semiconductor material in microgravity can be used to study the physical and chemical processes of many materials and systems. A greater understanding in these areas could aid researchers in the discovery of processes and materials that perform better and cost less to produce.

The crew was awakened at 11:53 pm for the start of Flight Day Five activities. The middeck payloads took center stage as the STS-62 crew worked through the second half of its fifth day on orbit. Allen and Gemar took turns in the Lower Body Negative Pressure Unit, each turn lasting an hour and 45 minutes. The sack-like device sealed at the waist so that pressure around the lower body could be gradually decreased. The lowered pressure drew body fluids down to the legs and lower torso, similar to the body's normal state on Earth. The LBNP protocol underwent testing as a countermeasure to a condition known as "orthostatic intolerance", in which a person feels lightheaded after standing. Some astronauts experienced such sensations upon standing after shuttle landings. Allen and Gemar also performed a 45-minute ramp test, but at the direction of ground controllers, terminated the test 40 seconds early. Casper, Thuot and Ivins relaxed on board Columbia for the first half of the day.

=== Day 5 ===
On Flight Day 5 (Tuesday, March 8) Columbia's crew continued a daily regimen of daily exercise, photography and monitoring the progress of crystal growth and bioprocessing experiments aboard Columbia.

Meanwhile, ground-based researchers remotely operating experiments in Columbia's payload bay continued their observations. Scientists working with the Space Shuttle Backscatter Ultraviolet instrument continued probing the layers of Earth's atmosphere and recorded data on tropospheric emissions from Mexican and Central American volcanoes; sulfur dioxide from industrial by-products in the troposphere above China and Japan; and observations in the mesosphere above the Mexican volcano Colima.

Among the experiments of the Office of Aeronautics and Space Technology-2 package, materials being designed for future spacecraft in the SAMPIE experiment were exposed to the orbital environment for the first time. Results included the operation of an advanced solar energy cell and plasma interactions with various materials while the orbiter's payload bay was pointed toward Earth.

Other OAST-2 accomplishments included ten freeze and thaw cycles of a new cooling technology for future spacecraft; spectrometer readings of airglow phenomena in the upper atmosphere with the EISG instrument; and studies of the orbiter's interaction with atomic oxygen using the SKIRT instrument.

Three members of the crew had a half-day off (Casper, Thuot, Ivins), and all of the crew would receive one more half-day off before the mission concluded on March 18. Columbia operated well with few problems encountered by the crew or Mission Control. The spacecraft remained in an orbit with a high point of 302 kilometres (163 nmi) and a low point of 298 kilometres (161 nmi). The crew began eight hours of sleep at 2:53 pm CST and awakened at 10:53 pm CST to start a sixth day in space.

=== Day 6 ===
On Flight Day 6, (Wednesday, March 9) the crew members devoted their time to the secondary experiment housed in Columbia's middeck. Gemar returned to his work with the Middeck 0-Gravity Dynamics Experiment. Allen took time from his day to talk with reporters in Cleveland, Ohio; Philadelphia, Pennsylvania; and Knoxville, Tennessee. Prior to his interview, Allen discussed the medical tests that the crew performed before, during, and after the flight. The astronauts collected blood and urine samples to help researchers determine the chemical regulatory changes the human body undergoes while in space. Pre- and post-flight tests studied the crew members' gait, steadiness while standing and exercise capacities.

Other crew members checked on the protein crystal growth experiments, performed some Auroral Photography experiments and checked the orbiter windows for any debris impacts. Later on Flight Day 6, the crew exercised using the Shuttle's ergometer.

Spacelab Mission Operations Control at the Marshall Space Flight Center reported the second United States Microgravity Payload (USMP-2) completed yet another day of successful operations in orbit aboard the Space Shuttle Columbia.

On the previous day, scientists with the Critical Fluid Light Scattering Experiment, or ZENO, concluded that they had indeed pinpointed the location of the long-sought-after critical point of xenon. For the next 24 hours, a series of subtle optical measurements were planned to be made in the area surrounding this phenomenon where the xenon behaved as both a liquid and a gas.

In the materials science field, the Advanced Automated Directional Solidification Furnace (AADSF) continued to grow a single crystal of mercury cadmium telluride in the microgravity environment of the orbiter's payload bay. The AADSF scientists said that telemetry from their experiment indicated crystal growth proceeded "exceptionally well."

After several days of successfully growing crystalline dendrites in microgravity, team members for the Isothermal Dendritic Growth Experiment (IDGE) reported that they were very pleased with the performance of the IDGE as well as the number and quality of the dendrites grown so far during the mission. The IDGE experimenters continued to monitor slow-scan video images of dendrites growing in their apparatus in order to maximize the efficiency of the instrument and the science results.

The Space Acceleration Measurement System (SAMS) continued to provide a running account of vibrations aboard the Shuttle to the other USMP-2 experiment teams. It recorded detailed measurements to characterize how smooth and stable a platform Columbia is providing for the experiments.

=== Day 7–8 ===
On Flight Day 7 (Thursday, March 10), Casper informed Allen that he was selected for promotion from Major in the US Marine Corps to Lt. Colonel.

On Flight Day 8 (Friday, March 11), marking the midpoint of the mission, Casper switched several of the environmental control systems to their backups for on-orbit check out. The procedures required crew members to switch to the alternate humidity separator, cabin pressure and temperature control systems, orbiter heaters, and carbon dioxide removal system.

Columbia also changed attitudes for the first time since launch day. Columbia orbited with its tail pointing toward the Earth and the payload bay pointing in the direction of travel or the "ram" position. With the maneuver, Casper closed and opened sample trays for the Long Duration Space Environment Candidate Material Exposure (LDCE) experiment. The LDCE consisted of three identical sample plates with 264 samples of various materials used in space vehicles. One of the sample plates was exposed to the space environment for most of the mission. Another was exposed only when the payload bay was pointing in the ram position – or pointing into the direction of travel – and a third only when the orbiter was not in the ram position.

Mission specialist Ivins was interviewed by students at the Bronx High School of Science. The students asked a variety of questions about the microgravity experiments being conducted during the mission on living and working in space.

Also, Gemar and Allen each completed 45-minute ramp tests in the lower body negative pressure unit, and performed more tests with the Middeck 0-Gravity Dynamics Experiment. Astronauts also performed the standard checks of the protein crystal growth and rodent experiments housed in Columbia's middeck.

Flight controllers in Houston put the finishing touches on a plan to uplink more digital video to the crew on Flight Day 9. The plan required procedural changes on the ground, but no action by the crew. The STS-62 crew began its sleep shift on time at 1:53 pm CST, and was scheduled to be awoken at 9:53 pm CST to begin its ninth day of orbit operations.

=== Day 9 ===
On Flight Day 9 (Saturday, March 12) plan called for operations of the Auroral Photography Experiment, the Commercial Protein Crystal Growth experiment and the Limited Duration Space Environment Candidate Exposure (LDCE) experiment. During the latter part of the day on Saturday, the crew unlatched the Remote Manipulator System and used it to help troubleshoot some off-nominal reception from the Experimental Investigation of Spacecraft Glow instrument in the payload bay. The arm's end effector camera was used to get a birds-eye view of EISG in operation.

=== Day 10 ===
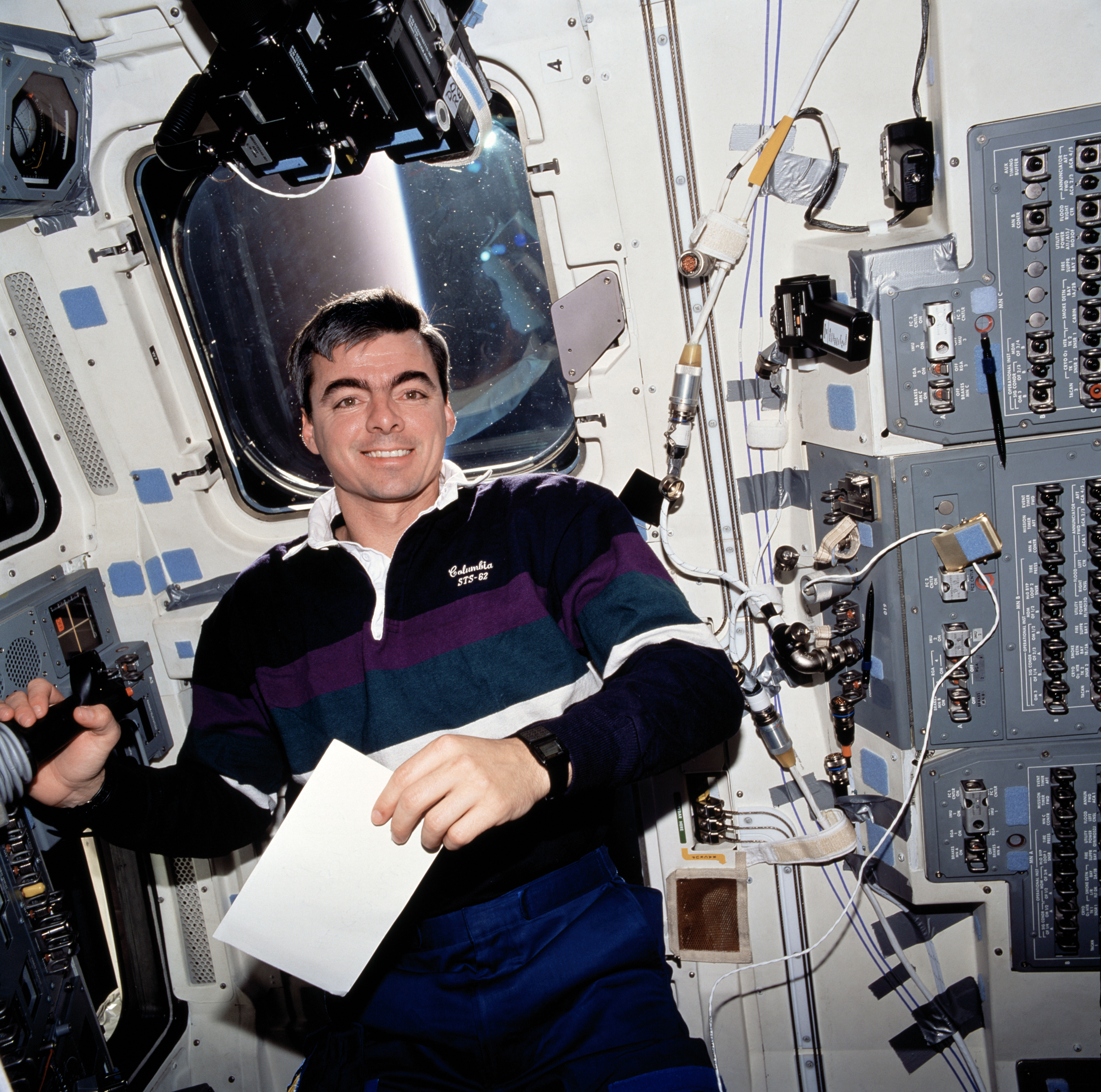
Andrew Allen on the flight deck on March 13

On Flight Day 10 (Sunday, March 13), the crew enjoyed a relatively light day of work, taking the first half of the day off, and spending the second half working with middeck experiments.

During an in-flight news conference, the crew responded to questions ranging from budget cutbacks and safety, to experimentation and life on the then-future International Space Station. Activities in the Mission Control Center focused on preparing, reviewing and uplinking messages outlining changes to the crew's scheduled activities for Flight Day 11. The crew began its standard eight hour sleep shift a little before 2 pm and was scheduled to wake up at 9:53 pm CST.

=== Day 11 ===
The Flight Day 11 (Monday, March 14) plan called for two OMS burns, OMS-3 of 37.9 ft/s (11.6 m/s) at MET 9/17:44 to lower the spacecraft's orbit to 140 by 157 nautical miles (259 by 291 km), and an OMS-4 of 31.8 ft/s (9.7 m/s) at MET 9/18:34 to lower the orbit even further to a 139-by-140-nautical-mile (257 by 259 km) orbit.

Awakened for their tenth day in space to the song "Starship Trooper" performed by the group Yes, Columbia's crew started the day by lowering the Shuttle's orbit by about 37 kilometres (20 nmi) and shifting the focus of science on board to the second major goal of the flight.

Experiments and observations in the cargo bay focused on the interaction of the orbiter with atomic oxygen, nitrogen and other gases in orbit, an interaction that caused a well-known glowing effect around the surfaces of the spacecraft. The lower orbit increased the effect, and instruments with the Office of Aeronautics and Space Technology-2 (OAST-2) package took center stage for the rest of the mission.

Early in the morning, Casper and Allen fired Columbia's Orbital Maneuvering System engines twice to descend from a 157-by-161-nautical-mile (291 by 298 km) high orbit to a 140-nautical-mile (260 km) circular orbit. Shortly thereafter, observations by OAST-2 began with a three-minute release of nitrogen gas from a canister in the cargo bay and a study of its effect on the glow of a special plate, constructed of materials to be used on future satellites. Later, Columbia, with tail pointed toward Earth, performed a 25-minute-long series of 360-degree spins to allow observations by OAST-2's Spacecraft Kinetic Infrared Test instrument. Such observations by both instruments set the pace for the ensuing days of the flight.

Ivins and Gemar each took a turn evaluating a tracking system for Columbia's RMS. Part of the Dexterous End Effector (DEE) experiment, the system used a mirror near the end of the arm, flashing light-emitting diodes, a cargo bay camera and a portable computer to assist an astronaut in finely aligning the arm. The Dexterous End Effector (DEE) experiment also looked at the forces generated by arm movements when its magnetic end effector was engaged. The forces were recorded by a force torque sensor that was also part of the DEE equipment. Each crew member also took a turn at exercise as had been the daily routine during the long-duration flight.

The astronauts continued to work with these experiments for the remaining part of their day, and began an eight-hour sleep period at 1:53 pm CST and awakened at 9:53 pm. On its 159th orbit, Columbia was in excellent condition and flight controllers noted no new problems with the spacecraft's systems.

As payload cameras showed the Earth vista from 260 kilometres (140 nmi) up, the crew sent a special goodnight message—the Bette Midler song "From a Distance" – for the people watching over them from below in Houston.

The message came at the end of a busy 11th day of on-orbit operations that featured a shift in focus from United States Microgravity Payload-2 to work with the Office of Aeronautics and Space Technology-2 (OAST-2) package.

=== Day 12 ===
The Flight Day 12 (Tuesday, March 15) plan called for Gemar and Allen to spend another hour and 45 minutes in the LBNP, the operation of the Dexterous End Effector (DEE) experiment, and the Experimental Investigation of Spacecraft Glow (EISG) experiment. The crew was awakened to the song "View From Above", written and performed by Allison Brown, who was inspired to write the song by Ivins. Columbia's crew spent the first half of their 12th day in space evaluating new technologies for the Shuttle's RMS.

Ivins, Thuot and Gemar took turns operating the arm as part of the DEE experiment. The crew gave good reviews to the technology during the morning, testing it by using the 50 foot (15 m) long arm to insert pins into sockets that had progressively smaller clearances, ranging from 3 millimetres (0.12 in) of clearance for the loosest to 0.76 millimetres (0.030 in) for the tightest. Later, a foot (300 mm) wide flat beam was inserted into a slot and then moved back and forth to correlate readings by the force sensor, technology that also was highly complimented by the crew.

While DEE operations progressed on the flight deck, Gemar and Allen each had one ramp session in the Lower Body Negative Pressure (LBNP) device.

The Office of Aeronautics and Space Technology-2 payload took center stage among the scientific investigations in the payload bay. The crew cooperated with investigators of the Experimental Investigation of Spacecraft Glow instruments, positioning the robot arm's camera above its sample plate in between DEE runs. A low-light camera in the payload bay that was supposed to have recorded the effects of gaseous nitrogen releases and their effect on shuttle glow failed earlier in the mission.

The Space Shuttle Backscatter Ultraviolet instruments in the payload bay also continued to take readings that were used to help calibrate free-flying satellites that continually monitored the ozone content of Earth's atmosphere.

The crew began an eight-hour sleep shift at 1:53 pm CST, and were awakened at 9:53 pm CST. About 2:08 am CST, a fifth Orbital Maneuvering System burn was planned in order to lower the perigee of Columbia's orbit to 194 kilometres (105 nmi) for additional spacecraft glow measurements.

=== Day 13 ===
The Flight Day 13 (Wednesday, March 16) plan called for another orbit change, an OMS-5 burn of 56.6 ft/s (17.3 m/s) at MET 11/18:08 which was planned to lower the orbit to 105 by 138 nautical miles (194 by 256 km). Also included was more work with the DEE experiment, a waste water dump and operation of both the Commercial Generic Bioprocessing Apparatus (CGBA) and the Commercial Protein Crystal Growth (CPCG) experiment.

Casper and Allen started out their 13th day in orbit with an eye toward the trip home, performing a standard check of the orbiter systems used for entry and landing.

For the first part of the morning's flight control systems checkout, the crew used APU 3, one of three units that supplied power for the spacecraft's hydraulic systems during launch and landing. APU 3, which had been the subject of scrutiny early in the mission due to high pressure readings in a fuel line, operated normally during the checkout.

Following the checkout, the crew fired Columbia's Orbital Maneuvering System engines for 38 seconds, dropping one side of their orbit by about 65 kilometres (35 nmi) to the lowest orbital altitude of any Shuttle flight to that date. Columbia was then placed in an elliptical orbit with a high point of 260 kilometres (140 nmi) and a low point of 194 kilometres (105 nmi). The lower orbit was required for continuing observations of the glowing effect created as the Shuttle interacted with atomic oxygen and other gases in low orbit.

During the first shuttle glow observations in the new orbit, Thuot reported the glowing effect was much more pronounced at the lower altitude. The crew also activated the Limited Duration Candidate Materials Exposure, or LDCE, experiment, exposing materials to the low-orbit environment that were under study for use on future spacecraft. The crew also began another series of evaluations of the Dexterous End Effector equipment using the RMS, testing the technology's magnetic grapple system, alignment system and force sensor.

The crew was awakened by the song "Traveling Prayer" performed by Billy Joel.

=== Day 14 ===
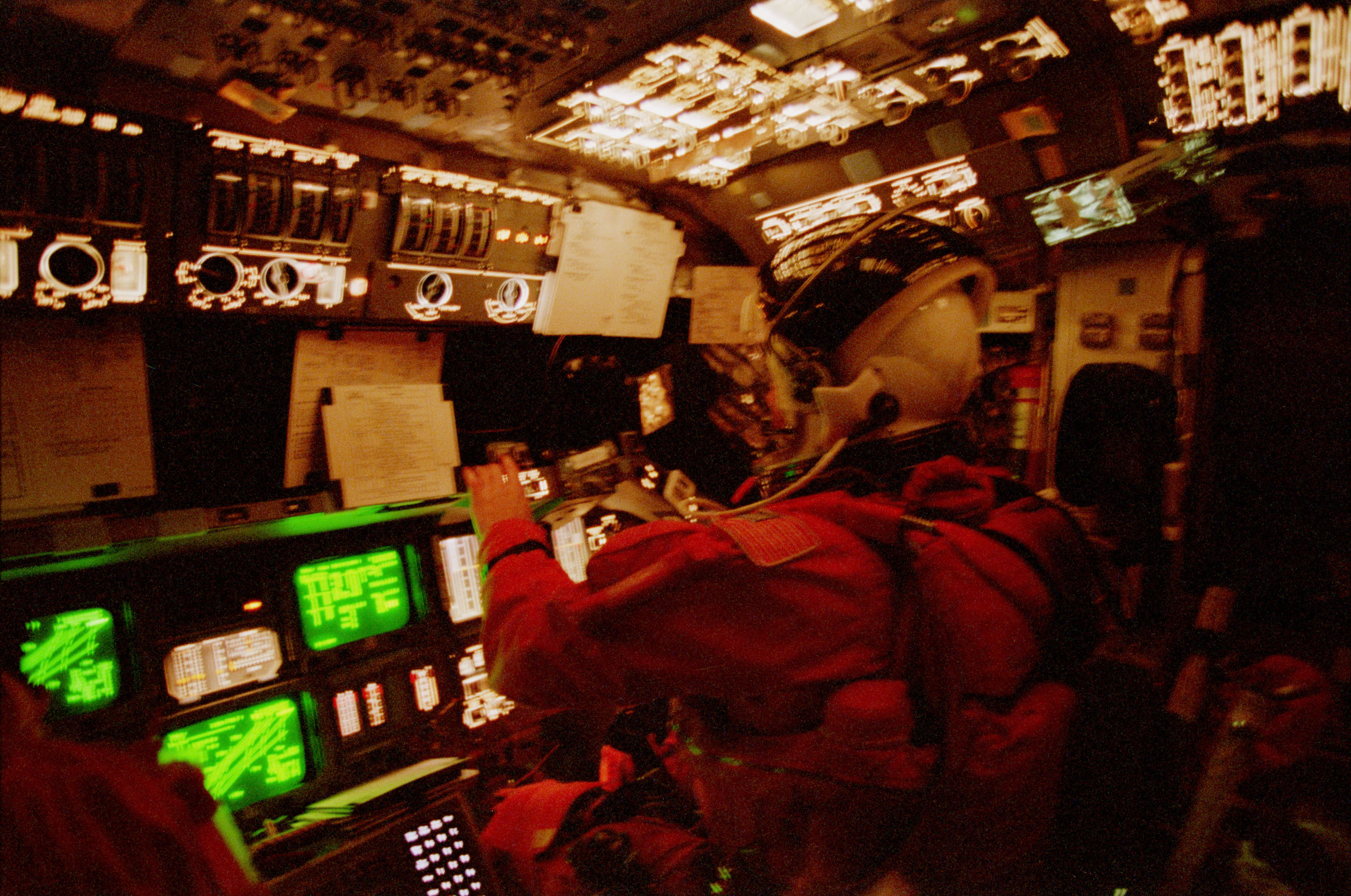
Pilot Andy Allen monitors reentry on the flight deck.

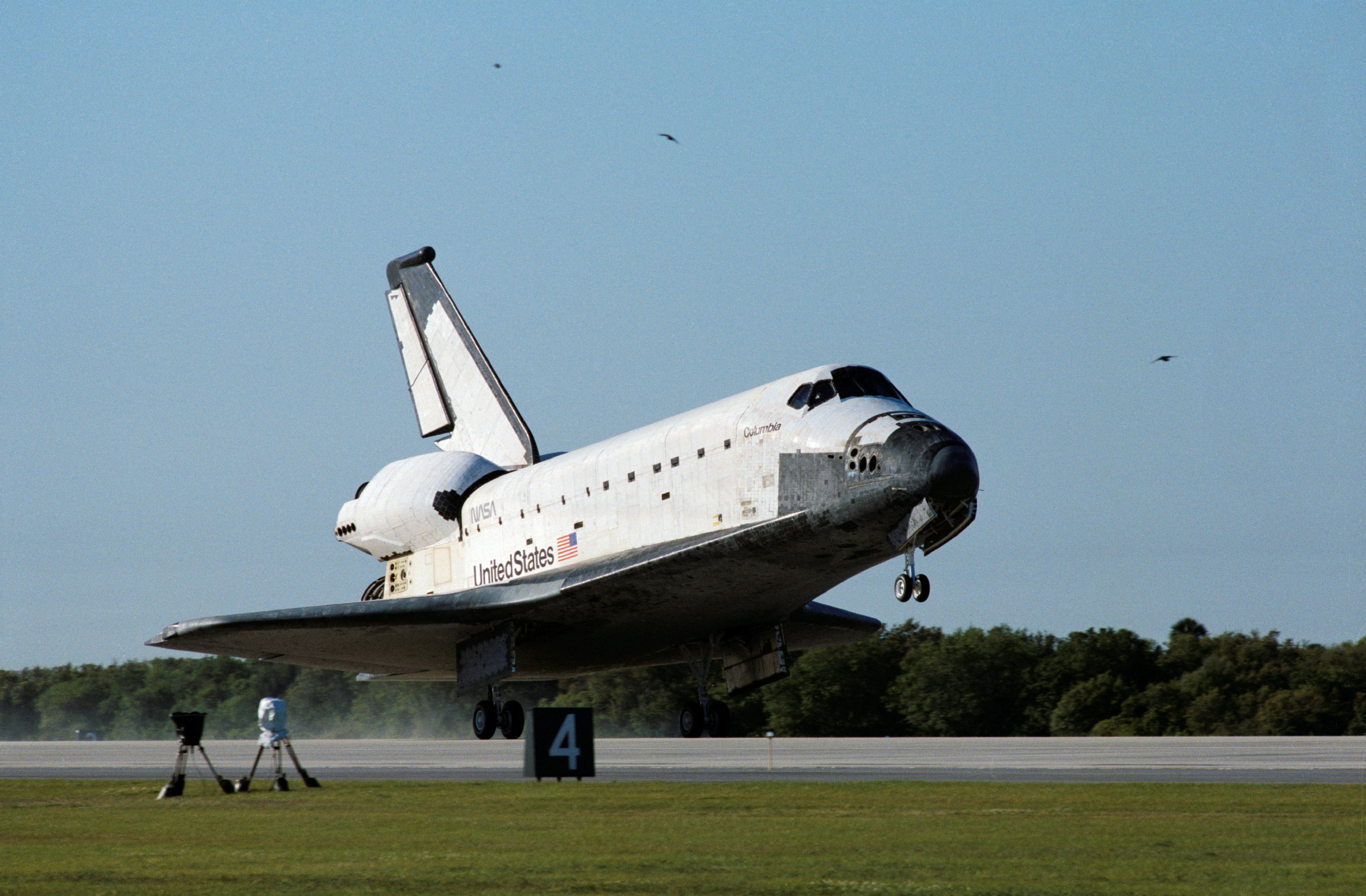
Columbia lands at KSC on March 18, 1994.

The Flight Day 14 (Thursday, March 17) plan called for a hot firing of the Reaction Control System (RCS) in preparation for the return flight, flight control system checkout, cabin stowage, SSBUV deactivation, and a final run in the Lower Body Negative Pressure device for Gemar. The crew was awakened for the 14th day of the flight to the song "Living in Paradise" by the Brothers Cazimero.

The crew performed final checks of their spacecraft, wrapped up their experiments and began packing their bags in preparation for the return to Earth. Columbia was scheduled to fire its OMS engines at 6:18 am CST to begin a descent that would culminate with a touchdown on the Kennedy Space Center Shuttle Landing Facility runway at 8:09 am EST. Casper and Allen test-fired Columbia's 38 primary steering jets early that morning as planned, finding them all in good shape for the trip home. Later, Casper and Allen each spent time practicing landings using a portable computer simulation designed for the Shuttle. During this time, Gemar spent four hours in the Lower Body Negative Pressure Device (LBNP).

Ivins powered down Columbia's mechanical arm and latched it in its cradle for the trip home, and Thuot completed operation of the two protein crystal growth experiments on board, preparing them for entry and landing.

Several final observations of the Shuttle glow effect, a phenomenon created as atomic oxygen and other gases impact the spacecraft, were conducted. Columbia performed another series of spins for the investigations that included more releases of nitrogen gas from payload bay canisters.

The final few hours of the crew's day were devoted to stowing gear and preparing Columbia for the mission's end. Before reentry, Columbia was in an orbit with a high point of 257 kilometres (139 nmi) and a low point of 194 kilometres (105 nmi).

The Flight Day 15 (Friday, March 18) plan called for deorbit preps and a deorbit burn of 209 ft/s (63.7 m/s) at MET 13/22:04 with a planned landing at KSC. Landing occurred on Runway 33 of the Shuttle Landing Facility on March 18, 1994, at approximately 8:10 am EST.

== See also ==
- List of human spaceflights
- List of Space Shuttle missions
- Outline of space science
- Space Shuttle
