= Shuttle Avionics Integration Laboratory =

Integration and training facility which supported the Space Shuttle program

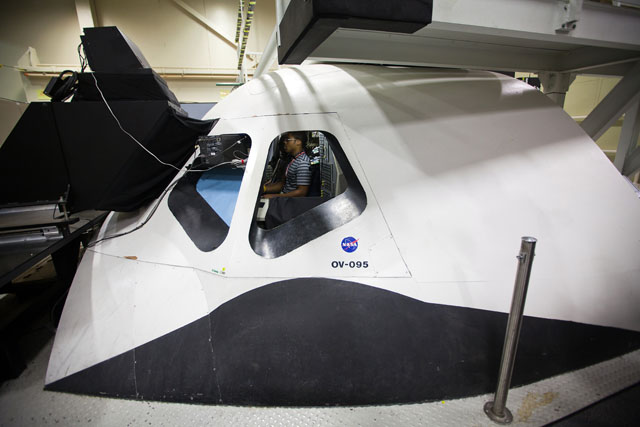
SAIL cockpit simulator

The Shuttle Avionics Integration Laboratory (SAIL) was a facility at Lyndon B. Johnson Space Center in Houston, Texas, US.

== Facility ==
It was the only facility in the Space Shuttle Program where actual orbiter hardware and flight software can be integrated and tested in a simulated flight environment. It supported the entire Space Shuttle program to perform integrated verification tests. It also contained Firing Room Launch Equipment identical to that used at KSC. Thus, complete ground verifications, as well as countdown and abort operations, could be tested and simulated.

The testing process is extensive and rigorous; the software on the Shuttle is often considered to be among the most bug-free of operational systems.

The laboratory contains a complete avionics mock-up of a Shuttle, designated OV-095. While only a skeleton of an orbiter, the electronics are identical in position and type to those used on the Shuttle; it is a sufficiently faithful replica that crews sometimes prefer to use it to train on, rather than the training simulators.

NASA personnel who have been assigned to SAIL testing include Charlie Bolden (former NASA Administrator), Michael Coats (former Director at JSC NASA), Brewster Shaw (Boeing Vice President of Space Exploration Division) and Al Crews (selected as an astronaut for the X-20 Dyna-Soar). The first SAIL commander was James E. Westom of Rockwell International, retired Major USAF. He flew the Approach and Landing phase in SAIL before Space Shuttle Enterprise was launched off the top of the NASA C-747 airplane to prove it could fly on its own in the atmosphere.

The SAIL facility will be renovated and recreated as a stop on the Space Center Houston Level 9 Tour, a separate add-on to the visitor center admission in which tourists are given entrance to buildings normally off limits to visitors.
