= List of human spaceflights, 1991–2000 =

This is a detailed list of human spaceflights from 1991 to 2000, including the continuation of Russian space station Mir and the American Space Shuttle program, and the first flights to the International Space Station (ISS).

The Soviet Union broke up at the end of 1991. From this date onwards the former USSR constituent republics are shown as separate nationalities.

#	Crew	Launch spacecraft	Habitation	Return spacecraft	Brief mission summary
141	(United States) Steven R. Nagel (3) (United States) Kenneth D. Cameron (1) (United States) Jerry L. Ross (3) (United States) Jerome Apt (1) (United States) Linda M. Godwin (1)	5 April 1991 (United States) STS-37, Atlantis		11 April 1991 (United States) STS-37, Atlantis	Deployment of Compton Gamma Ray Observatory.
142	(United States) Michael L. Coats (3) (United States) L. Blaine Hammond (1) (United States) Guion S. Bluford (3) (United States) Gregory J. Harbaugh (1) (United States) Richard J. Hieb (1) (United States) Donald R. McMonagle (1) (United States) Charles L. Veach (1)	28 April 1991 (United States) STS-39, Discovery		6 May 1991 (United States) STS-39, Discovery	U.S. Department of Defense mission. Part-classified payload, including various science experiments and observations.
143	(United Kingdom) Helen Sharman	18 May 1991 (Soviet Union) Soyuz TM-12	Mir	26 May 1991 (Soviet Union) Soyuz TM-11	Mir crew rotation. Life science experiments. First Briton in space (Sharman). First European woman in space (Sharman).
143	(Soviet Union) Anatoli Artsebarsky	18 May 1991 (Soviet Union) Soyuz TM-12	Mir	10 October 1991 (Soviet Union) Soyuz TM-12	Mir crew rotation. Life science experiments. First Briton in space (Sharman). First European woman in space (Sharman).
143	(Soviet Union) Sergei Krikalev (2)	18 May 1991 (Soviet Union) Soyuz TM-12	Mir	25 March 1992 (Russia) Soyuz TM-13	Mir crew rotation. Life science experiments. First Briton in space (Sharman). First European woman in space (Sharman).
144	(United States) Bryan D. O'Connor (2) (United States) Sidney M. Gutierrez (1) (United States) James P. Bagian (2) (United States) Tamara E. Jernigan (1) (United States) M. Rhea Seddon (2) (United States) F. Drew Gaffney (United States) Millie E. Hughes-Fulford	5 June 1991 (United States) STS-40, Columbia		14 June 1991 (United States) STS-40, Columbia	Spacelab life sciences mission, studying humans, rodents and jellyfish.
145	(United States) John E. Blaha (3) (United States) Michael A. Baker (1) (United States) Shannon W. Lucid (3) (United States) James C. Adamson (2) (United States) G. David Low (2)	2 August 1991 (United States) STS-43, Atlantis		11 August 1991 (United States) STS-43, Atlantis	Deployment of Tracking and Data Relay Satellite-5.
146	(United States) John O. Creighton (3) (United States) Kenneth S. Reightler (1) (United States) James F. Buchli (4) (United States) Charles D. Gemar (2) (United States) Mark N. Brown (2)	12 September 1991 (United States) STS-48, Discovery		18 September 1991 (United States) STS-48, Discovery	Deployment of Upper Atmosphere Research Satellite (UARS).
147	(Soviet Union) Toktar Aubakirov (Austria) Franz Viehböck	2 October 1991 (Soviet Union) Soyuz TM-13	Mir	10 October 1991 (Soviet Union) Soyuz TM-12	Mir crew rotation. First Kazakh in space (Aubakirov). First Austrian in space (Viehböck).
147	(Soviet Union) Aleksandr Volkov (3)	2 October 1991 (Soviet Union) Soyuz TM-13	Mir	25 March 1992 (Russia) Soyuz TM-13	Mir crew rotation. First Kazakh in space (Aubakirov). First Austrian in space (Viehböck).
148	(United States) Frederick D. Gregory (3) (United States) Terence T. Henricks (1) (United States) F. Story Musgrave (4) (United States) Mario Runco (1) (United States) James S. Voss (1) (United States) Thomas J. Hennen	24 November 1991 (United States) STS-44, Atlantis		1 December 1991 (United States) STS-44, Atlantis	U.S. Department of Defense mission. Deployment of Defense Support Program (DSP) satellite.
149	(United States) Ronald J. Grabe (3) (United States) Stephen S. Oswald (1) (United States) Norman E. Thagard (4) (United States) David C. Hilmers (4) (United States) William F. Readdy (1) (Canada) Roberta L. Bondar (Germany) Ulf Merbold (2)	22 January 1992 (United States) STS-42, Discovery		30 January 1992 (United States) STS-42, Discovery	International Microgravity Laboratory-1 (IML-1). Life sciences and materials processing experiments. First Canadian woman in space (Bondar).
150	(Germany) Klaus-Dietrich Flade	17 March 1992 (Russia) Soyuz TM-14	Mir	25 March 1992 (Russia) Soyuz TM-13	First Soyuz mission since the collapse of the USSR.
150	(Russia) Aleksandr Viktorenko (3) (Russia) Aleksandr Kaleri (1)	17 March 1992 (Russia) Soyuz TM-14	Mir	10 August 1992 (Russia) Soyuz TM-14	First Soyuz mission since the collapse of the USSR.
151	(United States) Charles F. Bolden (3) (United States) Brian Duffy (1) (United States) Kathryn D. Sullivan (3) (United States) David C. Leestma (3) (United States) C. Michael Foale (1) (United States) Byron K. Lichtenberg (2) (Belgium) Dirk Frimout	24 March 1992 (United States) STS-45, Atlantis		2 April 1992 (United States) STS-45, Atlantis	Atmospheric Laboratory for Applications and Science (ATLAS-1): international experiments in atmospheric and astronomical research. First Belgian in space (Frimout).
152	(United States) Daniel C. Brandenstein (4) (United States) Kevin P. Chilton (1) (United States) Pierre J. Thuot (2) (United States) Kathryn C. Thornton (2) (United States) Richard J. Hieb (2) (United States) Thomas D. Akers (2) (United States) Bruce E. Melnick (2)	7 May 1992 (United States) STS-49, Endeavour		16 May 1992 (United States) STS-49, Endeavour	Retrieval and redeployment of INTELSAT VI (F-3) satellite. Demonstration of maintenance and assembly capabilities for Space Station Freedom.
153	(United States) Richard N. Richards (3) (United States) Kenneth D. Bowersox (1) (United States) Bonnie J. Dunbar (3) (United States) Lawrence J. DeLucas (United States) Ellen S. Baker (2) (United States) Carl J. Meade (2) (United States) Eugene H. Trinh	25 June 1992 (United States) STS-50, Columbia		9 July 1992 (United States) STS-50, Columbia	United States Microgravity Laboratory-I (USML-1): various microgravity experiments.
154	(France) Michael Tognini (1)	27 July 1992 (Russia) Soyuz TM-15	Mir	10 August 1992 (Russia) Soyuz TM-14	Mir crew rotation.
154	(Russia) Anatoly Solovyev (3) (Russia) Sergei Avdeyev (1)	27 July 1992 (Russia) Soyuz TM-15	Mir	1 February 1993 (Russia) Soyuz TM-15	Mir crew rotation.
155	(United States) Loren J. Shriver (3) (United States) Andrew M. Allen (1) (United States) Jeffrey A. Hoffman (3) (United States) Franklin R. Chang-Diaz (3) (Switzerland) Claude Nicollier (1) (United States) Marsha S. Ivins (2) (Italy) Franco Malerba	31 July 1992 (United States) STS-46, Atlantis		8 August 1992 (United States) STS-46, Atlantis	Deployment of ESA's EURECA (European Retrievable Carrier). Deployment of joint NASA/Italian Space Agency Tethered Satellite System (TSS) (failed). First Swiss in space (Nicollier). First Italian in space (Malerba).
156	(United States) Robert L. Gibson (4) (United States) Curtis L. Brown (1) (United States) Mark C. Lee (2) (United States) N. Jan Davis (1) (United States) Jerome Apt (2) (United States) Mae C. Jemison (Japan) Mamoru Mohri (1)	12 September 1992 (United States) STS-47, Endeavour		20 September 1992 (United States) STS-47, Endeavour	50th Space Shuttle mission. Joint NASA and NASDA mission. Conducted microgravity investigations in materials and life sciences. First African-American woman in space (Jemison).
157	(United States) James B. Wetherbee (2) (United States) Michael A. Baker (2) (United States) Charles L. Veach (2) (United States) William M. Shepherd (3) (United States) Tamara E. Jernigan (2) (Canada) Steven G. MacLean (1)	22 October 1992 (United States) STS-52, Columbia		1 November 1992 (United States) STS-52, Columbia	Deployment of Laser Geodynamic Satellite II (LAGEOS-II). US Microgravity Payload-1 (USMP-1): physics experiments.
158	(United States) David M. Walker (3) (United States) Robert D. Cabana (2) (United States) Guion S. Bluford (4) (United States) James S. Voss (2) (United States) Michael R. Clifford (1)	2 December 1992 (United States) STS-53, Discovery		9 December 1992 (United States) STS-53, Discovery	Classified US Department of Defense primary payload, reportedly a reconnaissance satellite. Miscellaneous unclassified science experiments.
159	(United States) John H. Casper (2) (United States) Donald R. McMonagle (2) (United States) Mario Runco (2) (United States) Gregory J. Harbaugh (2) (United States) Susan J. Helms (1)	13 January 1993 (United States) STS-54, Endeavour		19 January 1993 (United States) STS-54, Endeavour	Deployment of fifth Tracking and Data Relay Satellite (TDRS-F). Diffuse X-ray Spectrometer (DXS) and microgravity experiments.
160	(Russia) Gennadi Manakov (2) (Russia) Aleksandr Poleshchuk	24 January 1993 (Russia) Soyuz TM-16	Mir	22 July 1993 (Russia) Soyuz TM-16	Docking system tests.
161	(United States) Kenneth D. Cameron (2) (United States) Stephen S. Oswald (2) (United States) C. Michael Foale (2) (United States) Kenneth D. Cockrell (1) (United States) Ellen L. Ochoa (1)	8 April 1993 (United States) STS-56, Discovery		17 April 1993 (United States) STS-56, Discovery	Atmospheric Laboratory for Applications and Science-2 (ATLAS-2). Atmospheric and solar science research.
162	(United States) Steven R. Nagel (4) (United States) Terence T. Henricks (2) (United States) Jerry L. Ross (4) (United States) Charles J. Precourt (1) (United States) Bernard A. Harris (1) (Germany) Ulrich Walter (Germany) Hans Schlegel (1)	26 April 1993 (United States) STS-55, Columbia		6 May 1993 (United States) STS-55, Columbia	German-sponsored Spacelab flight: miscellaneous science experiments.
163	(United States) Ronald J. Grabe (4) (United States) Brian Duffy (2) (United States) G. David Low (3) (United States) Nancy J. Sherlock Currie (1) (United States) Peter J. Wisoff (1) (United States) Janice E. Voss (1)	21 June 1993 (United States) STS-57, Endeavour		1 July 1993 (United States) STS-57, Endeavour	First SPACEHAB flight: biomedical and materials sciences experiments. Retrieval of ESA's EURECA (European Retrievable Carrier).
164	(France) Jean-Pierre Haigneré (1)	1 July 1993 (Russia) Soyuz TM-17	Mir	22 July 1993 (Russia) Soyuz TM-16	Mir crew rotation.
164	(Russia) Vasili Tsiblyev (1) (Russia) Aleksandr Serebrov (4)	1 July 1993 (Russia) Soyuz TM-17	Mir	13 January 1994 (Russia) Soyuz TM-17	Mir crew rotation.
165	(United States) Frank L. Culbertson (2) (United States) William F. Readdy (2) (United States) James H. Newman (1) (United States) Daniel W. Bursch (1) (United States) Carl E. Walz (1)	12 September 1993 (United States) STS-51, Discovery		22 September 1993 (United States) STS-51, Discovery	Deployment of Advanced Communications Technology Satellite (ACTS). Ultraviolet astronomical observations.
166	(United States) John E. Blaha (4) (United States) Richard A. Searfoss (1) (United States) M. Rhea Seddon (3) (United States) William S. McArthur (1) (United States) David A. Wolf (1) (United States) Shannon W. Lucid (4) (United States) Martin J. Fettman	18 October 1993 (United States) STS-58, Columbia		1 November 1993 (United States) STS-58, Columbia	Spacelab life sciences mission.
167	(United States) Richard O. Covey (4) (United States) Kenneth D. Bowersox (2) (United States) F. Story Musgrave (5) (United States) Kathryn C. Thornton (3) (Switzerland) Claude Nicollier (2) (United States) Jeffrey A. Hoffman (4) (United States) Thomas D. Akers (3)	2 December 1993 (United States) STS-61, Endeavour		13 December 1993 (United States) STS-61, Endeavour	First Hubble Space Telescope repair servicing mission.
168	(Russia) Viktor Afanasyev (2) (Russia) Yuri Usachyev (1)	8 January 1994 (Russia) Soyuz TM-18	Mir	9 July 1994 (Russia) Soyuz TM-18	Mir crew rotation.
168	(Russia) Valeri Polyokov (2)	8 January 1994 (Russia) Soyuz TM-18	Mir	22 March 1995 (Russia) Soyuz TM-20	Mir crew rotation.
169	(United States) Charles F. Bolden (4) (United States) Kenneth S. Reightler (2) (United States) N. Jan Davis (2) (United States) Ronald M. Sega (1) (United States) Franklin R. Chang-Diaz (4) (Russia) Sergei Krikalev (3)	3 February 1994 (United States) STS-60, Discovery		11 February 1994 (United States) STS-60, Discovery	SPACEHAB-2: materials science and life sciences investigations. Wake Shield Facility-1 deployment. Medical and radiological investigations. First Russian to fly aboard the Space Shuttle (Krikalev).
170	(United States) John H. Casper (3) (United States) Andrew M. Allen (2) (United States) Pierre J. Thuot (3) (United States) Charles D. Gemar (3) (United States) Marsha S. Ivins (3)	4 March 1994 (United States) STS-62, Columbia		18 March 1994 (United States) STS-62, Columbia	Miscellaneous scientific experiments.
171	(United States) Sidney M. Gutierrez (2) (United States) Kevin P. Chilton (2) (United States) Linda M. Godwin (2) (United States) Jerome Apt (3) (United States) Michael R. Clifford (2) (United States) Thomas D. Jones (1)	9 April 1994 (United States) STS-59, Endeavour		20 April 1994 (United States) STS-59, Endeavour	Radar mapping of Earth and atmospheric research.
172	(Russia) Yuri Malenchenko (1) (Russia) Talgat Musabayev (1)	3 July 1994 (Russia) Soyuz TM-19	Mir	4 November 1994 (Russia) Soyuz TM-19	Medical and materials science experiments. Mir repairs.
173	(United States) Robert D. Cabana (3) (United States) James D. Halsell (1) (United States) Richard J. Hieb (3) (United States) Carl E. Walz (2) (United States) Leroy Chiao (1) (United States) Donald A. Thomas (1) (Japan) Chiaki Naito-Mukai (1)	8 July 1994 (United States) STS-65, Columbia		23 July 1994 (United States) STS-65, Columbia	International Microgravity Laboratory-2: miscellaneous microgravity experiments. First Japanese woman in space (Naito-Mukai).
174	(United States) Richard N. Richards (4) (United States) L. Blaine Hammond (2) (United States) Jerry M. Linenger (1) (United States) Susan J. Helms (2) (United States) Carl J. Meade (3) (United States) Mark C. Lee (3)	9 September 1994 (United States) STS-64, Discovery		20 September 1994 (United States) STS-64, Discovery	Atmospheric and solar observations.
175	(United States) Michael A. Baker (3) (United States) Terrence W. Wilcutt (1) (United States) Thomas D. Jones (2) (United States) Steven L. Smith (1) (United States) Daniel W. Bursch (2) (United States) Peter J. K. Wisoff (2)	30 September 1994 (United States) STS-68, Endeavour		11 October 1994 (United States) STS-68, Endeavour	Radar imaging of Earth.
176	(Germany) Ulf Merbold (3)	4 October 1994 (Russia) Soyuz TM-20	Mir	4 November 1994 (Russia) Soyuz TM-19	Mir crew rotation.
176	(Russia) Aleksandr Viktorenko (4) (Russia) Yelena Kondakova (1)	4 October 1994 (Russia) Soyuz TM-20	Mir	22 March 1995 (Russia) Soyuz TM-20	Mir crew rotation.
177	(United States) Donald R. McMonagle (3) (United States) Curtis L. Brown (2) (United States) Ellen L. Ochoa (2) (United States) Scott E. Parazynski (1) (United States) Joseph R. Tanner (1) (France) Jean-François Clervoy (1)	3 November 1994 (United States) STS-66, Atlantis		14 November 1994 (United States) STS-66, Atlantis	Atmospheric research.
178	(United States) James D. Wetherbee (3) (United States) Eileen M. Collins (1) (United States) C. Michael Foale (3) (United States) Janice E. Voss (2) (United States) Bernard A. Harris (2) (Russia) Vladimir G. Titov (3)	3 February 1995 (United States) STS-63, Discovery		11 February 1995 (United States) STS-63, Discovery	Rendezvous maneuver with Mir. First female pilot (Collins). SPACEHAB-3: miscellaneous science experiments. First EVA by an African-American astronaut (Harris).
179	(United States) Stephen S. Oswald (3) (United States) William G. Gregory (United States) Tamara E. Jernigan (3) (United States) John M. Grunsfeld (1) (United States) Wendy B. Lawrence (1) (United States) Ronald A. Parise (2) (United States) Samuel T. Durrance (2)	2 March 1995 (United States) STS-67, Endeavour		18 March 1995 (United States) STS-67, Endeavour	Ultraviolet astronomy studies.
180	(United States) Norman E. Thagard (5) (Russia) Vladimir Dezhurov (1) (Russia) Gennady Strekalov (5)	14 March 1995 (Russia) Soyuz TM-21	Mir	7 July 1995 (United States) STS-71, Atlantis	First American to visit Mir (Thagard).
181	(United States) Robert L. Gibson (5) (United States) Charles J. Precourt (2) (United States) Ellen S. Baker (3) (United States) Bonnie J. Dunbar (4) (United States) Gregory J. Harbaugh (3)	27 June 1995 (United States) STS-71, Atlantis	Mir	7 July 1995 (United States) STS-71, Atlantis	First Shuttle-Mir docking. Biomedical experiments. Mir crew rotation and resupply.
181	(Russia) Anatoly Solovyev (4) (Russia) Nikolai Budarin (1)	27 June 1995 (United States) STS-71, Atlantis	Mir	11 September 1995 (Russia) Soyuz TM-21	First Shuttle-Mir docking. Biomedical experiments. Mir crew rotation and resupply.
182	(United States) Terence T. Henricks (3) (United States) Kevin R. Kregel (1) (United States) Nancy J. Sherlock Currie (2) (United States) Donald A. Thomas (2) (United States) Mary E. Weber (1)	13 July 1995 (United States) STS-70, Discovery		22 July 1995 (United States) STS-70, Discovery	Deployment of 7th Tracking and Data Relay Satellite (TDRS). Biological and biomedical studies.
183	(Russia) Sergei Avdeyev (2) (Russia) Yuri Ghidzenko (1) (Germany) Thomas Reiter (1)	3 September 1995 (Russia) Soyuz TM-22	Mir	29 February 1996 (Russia) Soyuz TM-22	Mir crew rotation. First EVA by a German cosmonaut (Reiter).
184	(United States) David M. Walker (4) (United States) Kenneth D. Cockrell (2) (United States) James S. Voss (3) (United States) James H. Newman (2) (United States) Michael L. Gernhardt (1)	7 September 1995 (United States) STS-69, Endeavour		18 September 1995 (United States) STS-69, Endeavour	Solar observations. Wake Shield Facility-2 deployment.
185	(United States) Kenneth D. Bowersox (3) (United States) Kent V. Rominger (1) (United States) Kathryn C. Thornton (4) (United States) Catherine G. Coleman (1) (United States) Michael E. Lopez-Alegria (1) (United States) Fred W. Leslie (United States) Albert Sacco	20 October 1995 (United States) STS-73, Columbia		5 November 1995 (United States) STS-73, Columbia	Microgravity experiments.
186	(United States) Kenneth D. Cameron (3) (United States) James D. Halsell (2) (United States) Jerry L. Ross (5) (United States) William S. McArthur (2) (Canada) Chris A. Hadfield (1)	12 November 1995 (United States) STS-74, Atlantis	Mir	20 November 1995 (United States) STS-74, Atlantis	Second Shuttle-Mir docking. Delivery of Russian docking module and solar arrays.
187	(United States) Brian Duffy (3) (United States) Brent W. Jett (1) (United States) Leroy Chiao (2) (United States) Daniel T. Barry (1) (United States) Winston E. Scott (1) (Japan) Koichi Wakata (1)	11 January 1996 (United States) STS-72, Endeavour		20 January 1996 (United States) STS-72, Endeavour	Capture and return to Earth of Space Flyer Unit (Japanese microgravity research spacecraft).
188	(Russia) Yuri Onufrienko (1) (Russia) Yuri Usachyev (2)	21 February 1996 (Russia) Soyuz TM-23	Mir	2 September 1996 (Russia) Soyuz TM-23	
189	(United States) Andrew M. Allen (3) (United States) Scott J. Horowitz (1) (United States) Franklin R. Chang-Diaz (5) (Italy) Maurizio Cheli (United States) Jeffrey A. Hoffman (5) (Switzerland) Claude Nicollier (3) (Italy) Umberto Guidoni (1)	22 February 1996 (United States) STS-75, Columbia		9 March 1996 (United States) STS-75, Columbia	Deployment of Tethered Satellite System (TSS-1R) (reflight, partial success). Microgravity research.
190	(United States) Kevin P. Chilton (3) (United States) Richard A. Searfoss (2) (United States) Linda M. Godwin (3) (United States) Michael R. Clifford (3) (United States) Ronald M. Sega (2)	22 March 1996 (United States) STS-76, Atlantis	Mir	31 March 1996 (United States) STS-76, Atlantis	Mir crew rotation and resupply. First American woman on Mir (Lucid).
190	(United States) Shannon W. Lucid (5)	22 March 1996 (United States) STS-76, Atlantis	Mir	26 September 1996 (United States) STS-79, Atlantis	Mir crew rotation and resupply. First American woman on Mir (Lucid).
191	(United States) John H. Casper (4) (United States) Curtis L. Brown (3) (United States) Daniel W. Bursch (3) (United States) Mario Runco Jr. (3) (Canada) J. Marc Garneau (2) (United States) Andrew S.W. Thomas (1)	19 May 1996 (United States) STS-77, Endeavour		29 May 1996 (United States) STS-77, Endeavour	SPACEHAB-4: miscellaneous science experiments. Deployment of Spartan-207/IAE (Inflatable Antenna Experiment) satellite. Rendezvous with experimental satellite.
192	(United States) Terence T. Henricks (4) (United States) Kevin R. Kregel (2) (United States) Susan J. Helms (3) (United States) Richard M. Linnehan (1) (United States) Charles E. Brady (France) Jean-Jacques Favier (Canada) Robert B. Thirsk (1)	20 June 1996 (United States) STS-78, Columbia		7 July 1996 (United States) STS-78, Columbia	Microgravity, human physiology and life sciences research.
193	(France) Claudie Haigneré (1)	18 August 1996 (Russia) Soyuz TM-24	Mir	2 September 1996 (Russia) Soyuz TM-23	Mir crew rotation. Biological and medical experiments. First Frenchwoman in space (Andre-Deshays).
193	(Russia) Valery Korzun (1) (Russia) Aleksandr Kaleri (2)	18 August 1996 (Russia) Soyuz TM-24	Mir	2 March 1997 (Russia) Soyuz TM-24	Mir crew rotation. Biological and medical experiments. First Frenchwoman in space (Andre-Deshays).
194	(United States) William F. Readdy (3) (United States) Terrence W. Wilcutt (2) (United States) Thomas D. Akers (4) (United States) Jerome Apt (4) (United States) Carl E. Walz (3)	16 September 1996 (United States) STS-79, Atlantis	Mir	26 September 1996 (United States) STS-79, Atlantis	Mir crew rotation and resupply. Miscellaneous scientific experiments.
194	(United States) John E. Blaha (5)	16 September 1996 (United States) STS-79, Atlantis	Mir	22 January 1997 (United States) STS-81, Atlantis	Mir crew rotation and resupply. Miscellaneous scientific experiments.
195	(United States) Kenneth D. Cockrell (3) (United States) Kent V. Rominger (2) (United States) Tamara E. Jernigan (4) (United States) Thomas D. Jones (3) (United States) F. Story Musgrave (6)	19 November 1996 (United States) STS-80, Columbia		7 December 1996 (United States) STS-80, Columbia	Deployment and retrieval of Wake Shield Facility and German-built Orbiting and Retrievable Far and Extreme Ultraviolet Spectrograph-Shuttle Pallet Satellite II (ORFEUS-SPAS II).
196	(United States) Michael A. Baker (4) (United States) Brent W. Jett (2) (United States) John M. Grunsfeld (2) (United States) Marsha S. Ivins (4) (United States) Peter J. K. Wisoff (3)	12 January 1997 (United States) STS-81, Atlantis	Mir	22 January 1997 (United States) STS-81, Atlantis	Mir crew rotation and resupply.
196	(United States) Jerry M. Linenger (2)	12 January 1997 (United States) STS-81, Atlantis	Mir	24 May 1997 (United States) STS-84, Atlantis	Mir crew rotation and resupply.
197	(Germany) Reinhold Ewald	10 February 1997 (Russia) Soyuz TM-25	Mir	2 March 1997 (Russia) Soyuz TM-24	Mir crew rotation and resupply.
197	(Russia) Vasili Tsibliev (2) (Russia) Aleksandr Lazutkin	10 February 1997 (Russia) Soyuz TM-25	Mir	14 August 1997 (Russia) Soyuz TM-25	Mir crew rotation and resupply.
198	(United States) Kenneth D. Bowersox (4) (United States) Scott J. Horowitz (2) (United States) Mark C. Lee (4) (United States) Steven A. Hawley (4) (United States) Gregory J. Harbaugh (4) (United States) Steven L. Smith (2) (United States) Joseph R. Tanner (2)	11 February 1997 (United States) STS-82, Discovery		21 February 1997 (United States) STS-82, Discovery	Hubble Space Telescope servicing mission.
199	(United States) James D. Halsell (3) (United States) Susan L. Still (1) (United States) Janice E. Voss (3) (United States) Donald A. Thomas (3) (United States) Michael L. Gernhardt (2) (United States) Roger K. Crouch (1) (United States) Gregory T. Linteris (1)	4 April 1997 (United States) STS-83, Columbia		8 April 1997 (United States) STS-83, Columbia	Microgravity experiments. Mission cut short due to fuel cell problems.
200	(United States) Charles J. Precourt (3) (United States) Eileen M. Collins (2) (France) Jean-François Clervoy (2) (United States) Carlos I. Noriega (1) (United States) Edward T. Lu (1) (Russia) Yelena Kondakova (2)	15 May 1997 (United States) STS-84, Atlantis	Mir	24 May 1997 (United States) STS-84, Atlantis	Mir crew rotation and resupply. First joint US-Russian space walk.
200	(United States) C. Michael Foale (4)	15 May 1997 (United States) STS-84, Atlantis	Mir	6 October 1997 (United States) STS-86, Atlantis	Mir crew rotation and resupply. First joint US-Russian space walk.
201	(United States) James D. Halsell (4) (United States) Susan L. Still (2) (United States) Janice E. Voss (4) (United States) Donald A. Thomas (4) (United States) Michael L. Gernhardt (3) (United States) Roger K. Crouch (2) (United States) Gregory T. Linteris (2)	1 July 1997 (United States) STS-94, Columbia		17 July 1997 (United States) STS-94, Columbia	Microgravity experiments. Reflight of curtailed STS-83 mission.
202	(Russia) Anatoly Solovyev (5) (Russia) Pavel Vinogradov (1)	6 August 1997 (Russia) Soyuz TM-26	Mir	19 February 1998 (Russia) Soyuz TM-26	Mir repair.
203	(United States) Curtis L. Brown (4) (United States) Kent V. Rominger (3) (United States) N. Jan Davis (3) (United States) Robert L. Curbeam (1) (United States) Stephen K. Robinson (1) (Canada) Bjarni V. Tryggvason	7 August 1997 (United States) STS-85, Discovery		19 August 1997 (United States) STS-85, Discovery	Atmospheric research.
204	(United States) James D. Wetherbee (4) (United States) Michael J. Bloomfield (1) (Russia) Vladimir Titov (4) (United States) Scott E. Parazynski (2) (France) Jean-Loup Chrétien (3) (United States) Wendy B. Lawrence (2)	25 September 1997 (United States) STS-86, Atlantis	Mir	6 October 1997 (United States) STS-86, Atlantis	Mir crew rotation and resupply.
204	(United States) David A. Wolf (2)	25 September 1997 (United States) STS-86, Atlantis	Mir	31 January 1998 (United States) STS-89, Endeavour	Mir crew rotation and resupply.
205	(United States) Kevin R. Kregel (3) (United States) Steven W. Lindsey (1) (United States) Winston E. Scott (2) (United States) Kalpana Chawla (1) (Japan) Takao Doi (1) (Ukraine) Leonid Kadeniuk	19 November 1997 (United States) STS-87, Columbia		5 December 1997 (United States) STS-87, Columbia	Miscellaneous scientific experiments. First Japanese EVA (Doi). First Ukrainian in space (Kadenyuk).
206	(United States) Terrence W. Wilcutt (3) (United States) Joe F. Edwards (United States) Bonnie J. Dunbar (5) (United States) Michael P. Anderson (1) (United States) James F. Reilly (1) (Russia) Salizhan Sharipov (1)	22 January 1998 (United States) STS-89, Endeavour	Mir	31 January 1998 (United States) STS-89, Endeavour	Mir crew rotation and resupply.
206	(United States) Andrew S.W. Thomas (2)	22 January 1998 (United States) STS-89, Endeavour	Mir	12 June 1998 (United States) STS-91, Discovery	Mir crew rotation and resupply.
207	(France) Léopold Eyharts (1)	29 January 1998 (Russia) Soyuz TM-27	Mir	19 February 1998 (Russia) Soyuz TM-26	Mir crew rotation.
207	(Russia) Talgat Musabayev (2) (Russia) Nikolai Budarin (2)	29 January 1998 (Russia) Soyuz TM-27	Mir	25 August 1998 (Russia) Soyuz TM-27	Mir crew rotation.
208	(United States) Richard A. Searfoss (3) (United States) Scott D. Altman (1) (United States) Richard M. Linnehan (2) (Canada) Dafydd R. Williams (1) (United States) Kathryn P. Hire (1) (United States) Jay C. Buckley (United States) James A. Pawelzyk	17 April 1998 (United States) STS-90, Columbia		3 May 1998 (United States) STS-90, Columbia	Neuroscience research. Final Spacelab mission.
209	(United States) Charles J. Precourt (4) (United States) Dominic L. Pudwill Gorie (1) (United States) Wendy B. Lawrence (3) (United States) Franklin R. Chang-Diaz (6) (United States) Janet L. Kavandi (1) (Russia) Valery Ryumin (4)	2 June 1998 (United States) STS-91, Discovery	Mir	12 June 1998 (United States) STS-91, Discovery	Final Shuttle-Mir docking. Mir crew rotation and resupply. Astrophysics research.
210	(Russia) Yuri Baturin (1)	15 August 1998 (Russia) Soyuz TM-28	Mir	25 August 1998 (Russia) Soyuz TM-27	Mir crew rotation.
210	(Russia) Gennady Padalka (1)	15 August 1998 (Russia) Soyuz TM-28	Mir	28 February 1999 (Russia) Soyuz TM-28	Mir crew rotation.
210	(Russia) Sergei Avdeyev (3)	15 August 1998 (Russia) Soyuz TM-28	Mir	28 August 1999 (Russia) Soyuz TM-29	Mir crew rotation.
211	(United States) Curtis L. Brown (5) (United States) Steven W. Lindsey (2) (United States) Scott E. Parazynski (3) (United States) Stephen K. Robinson (2) (Spain) Pedro Duque (1) (Japan) Chiaki Mukai (2) (United States) John H. Glenn (2)	29 October 1998 (United States) STS-95, Discovery		7 November 1998 (United States) STS-95, Discovery	Miscellaneous scientific experiments. First Spaniard in space (Duque). Veteran John Glenn returned to space aged 77.
212	(United States) Robert D. Cabana (4) (United States) Frederick W. Sturckow (1) (United States) Nancy J. Sherlock Currie (3) (United States) Jerry L. Ross (6) (United States) James H. Newman (3) (Russia) Sergei Krikalev (4)	4 December 1998 (United States) STS-88, Endeavour	ISS	15 December 1998 (United States) STS-88, Endeavour	First ISS construction mission. Delivery of Unity Node Module.
213	(Slovakia) Ivan Bella	20 February 1999 (Russia) Soyuz TM-29	Mir	28 February 1999 (Russia) Soyuz TM-28	Mir crew rotation. First Slovak in space (Bella).
213	(Russia) Viktor Afanasyev (3) (France) Jean-Pierre Haigneré (2)	20 February 1999 (Russia) Soyuz TM-29	Mir	28 August 1999 (Russia) Soyuz TM-29	Mir crew rotation. First Slovak in space (Bella).
214	(United States) Kent V. Rominger (4) (United States) Rick D. Husband (1) (United States) Ellen L. Ochoa (3) (United States) Tamara E. Jernigan (5) (United States) Daniel T. Barry (2) (Canada) Julie Payette (1) (Russia) Valery Tokarev (1)	27 May 1999 (United States) STS-96, Discovery	ISS	6 June 1999 (United States) STS-96, Discovery	Second ISS flight. ISS assembly and resupply.
215	(United States) Eileen M. Collins (3) (United States) Jeffrey S. Ashby (1) (United States) Steven A. Hawley (5) (United States) Catherine G. Coleman (2) (France) Michel Tognini (2)	23 July 1999 (United States) STS-93, Columbia		27 July 1999 (United States) STS-93, Columbia	Deployment of Chandra X-ray Observatory. First female Shuttle Commander (Collins).
216	(United States) Curtis L. Brown (6) (United States) Scott J. Kelly (1) (United States) Steven L. Smith (3) (United States) C. Michael Foale (5) (United States) John M. Grunsfeld (3) (Switzerland) Claude Nicollier (4) (France) Jean-François Clervoy (3)	19 December 1999 (United States) STS-103, Discovery		27 December 1999 (United States) STS-103, Discovery	Hubble Space Telescope servicing.
217	(United States) Kevin R. Kregel (4) (United States) Dominic L. Pudwill Gorie (2) (United States) Janet L. Kavandi (2) (United States) Janice E. Voss (5) (Japan) Mamoru Mohri (2) (Germany) Gerhard Thiele	11 February 2000 (United States) STS-99, Endeavour		22 February 2000 (United States) STS-99, Endeavour	Radar topographic mapping of Earth's surface.
218	(Russia) Sergei Zalyotin (1) (Russia) Aleksandr Kaleri (3)	4 April 2000 (Russia) Soyuz TM-30	Mir	16 June 2000 (Russia) Soyuz TM-30	Mir repairs. 39th and final Mir mission.
219	(United States) James D. Halsell (5) (United States) Scott J. Horowitz (3) (United States) Mary E. Weber (2) (United States) Jeffrey N. Williams (1) (United States) James S. Voss (4) (United States) Susan J. Helms (4) (Russia) Yuri Usachev (3)	19 May 2000 (United States) STS-101, Atlantis	ISS	29 May 2000 (United States) STS-101, Atlantis	ISS construction and supply.
220	(United States) Terrence W. Wilcutt (4) (United States) Scott D. Altman (2) (United States) Daniel C. Burbank (1) (United States) Edward T. Lu (2) (United States) Richard A. Mastracchio (1) (Russia) Yuri Malenchenko (2) (Russia) Boris Morukov	8 September 2000 (United States) STS-106, Atlantis	ISS	19 September 2000 (United States) STS-106, Atlantis	ISS supply. Preparation for first long-term crew.
221	(United States) Brian Duffy (4) (United States) Pamela A. Melroy (1) (Japan) Koichi Wakata (2) (United States) Leroy Chiao (3) (United States) Peter J. K. Wisoff (4) (United States) Michael E. Lopez-Alegria (2) (United States) William S. McArthur (3)	11 October 2000 (United States) STS-92, Discovery	ISS	24 October 2000 (United States) STS-92, Discovery	ISS construction and outfitting. 100th Space Shuttle mission.
222	(Russia) Yuri Gidzenko (2) (Russia) Sergei Krikalev (5) (United States) William M. Shepherd (4)	31 October 2000 (Russia) Soyuz TM-31	ISS (crew 1)	21 March 2001 (United States) STS-102, Discovery	First ISS Expedition Crew.
223	(United States) Brent W. Jett (3) (United States) Michael J. Bloomfield (2) (United States) Joseph R. Tanner (3) (Canada) J. Marc Garneau (3) (United States) Carlos I. Noriega (2)	30 November 2000 (United States) STS-97, Endeavour	ISS	11 December 2000 (United States) STS-97, Endeavour	ISS construction and supply. Delivery of the first set of solar arrays and batteries.

== See also ==
- List of human spaceflight programs
- List of human spaceflights
- List of human spaceflights, 1961–1970
- List of human spaceflights, 1971–1980
- List of human spaceflights, 1981–1990
- List of human spaceflights, 2001–2010
- List of human spaceflights, 2011–2020
- List of human spaceflights, 2021–present
