= NASA Astronaut Group 12 =

1987 human spaceflight selection of 15 candidates; "The GAFFers"

The GAFFers
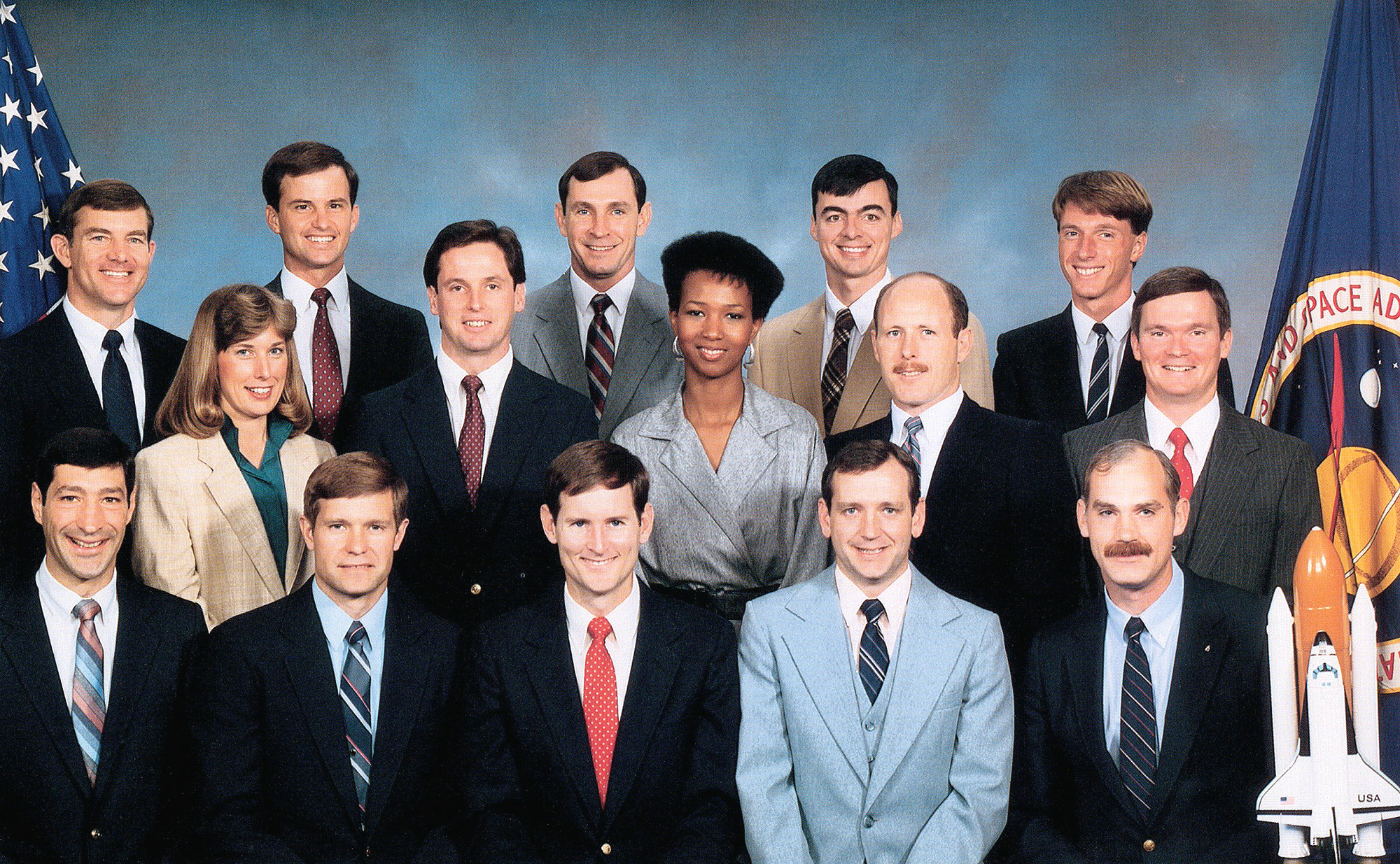
- The Astronauts of Group 12
- Year selected: 1987
- Number selected: 15

NASA Astronaut Group 12 (nicknamed "The GAFFers") was a group of 15 astronauts announced by NASA on June 5, 1987.

== Group members ==
=== Pilots ===
- Andrew M. Allen (born 1955), U.S. Marine Corps (3 flights)

STS-46 Atlantis — July 1992 — Pilot — Deployment of EURECA and Tethered Satellite System (TSS)
STS-62 Columbia — March 1994 — Pilot — Microgravity experiments
STS-75 Columbia — February 1996 — Commander — Tethered Satellite System reflight, lost due to broken tether

- Kenneth D. Bowersox (born 1956), U.S. Navy (5 flights)

STS-50 Columbia — June 1992 — Pilot — Spacelab mission
STS-61 Endeavour — December 1993 — Pilot — First Hubble Space Telescope servicing mission
STS-73 Columbia — October 1995 — Commander — Spacelab mission
STS-82 Discovery — February 1997 — Commander — Second Hubble Space Telescope servicing mission
STS-113 Endeavour — November 2002 — Mission Specialist 3 (launched only) — ISS assembly flight 11A: P1 truss, crew rotation
ISS Expedition 6 — November 2002–May 2003 — ISS Commander
Soyuz TMA-1 — May 2003 — Flight Engineer (landed only) — ISS crew rotation

- Curtis L. Brown, Jr. (born 1956), U.S. Air Force (6 flights)

STS-47 Endeavour — September 1992 — Pilot — Spacelab-J, Japan-funded Spacelab mission
STS-66 Atlantis — November 1994 — Pilot — ATLAS-3 science platform experiments
STS-77 Endeavour — May 1996 — Pilot — SPACEHAB, SPARTAN
STS-85 Discovery — August 1997 — Commander — Deployed and retrieved CRISTA-SPAS
STS-95 Discovery — October 1998 — Commander — SPACEHAB
STS-103 Discovery — December 1999 — Commander — Third Hubble Space Telescope servicing mission

- Kevin P. Chilton (born 1954), U.S. Air Force (3 flights)

STS-49 Endeavour — May 1992 — Pilot — Intelsat VI hand-retrieval and repair
STS-59 Endeavour — April 1994 — Pilot — Experiments aboard Shuttle Radar Laboratory-1
STS-76 Atlantis — March 1996 — Commander — Third Shuttle-Mir docking

- Donald R. McMonagle (born 1952), U.S. Air Force (3 flights)

STS-39 Discovery — April 1991 — Mission Specialist 4 — First unclassified DoD mission, military science experiments
STS-54 Endeavour — January 1993 — Pilot – Tracking and data relay satellite (TDRS-F) deployment
STS-66 Atlantis — November 1994 — Commander — ATLAS-3 science platform experiments

- William F. Readdy (born 1952), U.S. Navy (3 flights)

STS-42 Discovery — January 1992 — Mission Specialist 3 — Spacelab mission
STS-51 Discovery — September 1993 — Pilot — ACTS satellite deployment, SPAS-ORFEUS deployment and retrieval
STS-79 Atlantis — September 1996 — Commander — Fourth Shuttle-Mir docking

- Kenneth S. Reightler, Jr. (born 1951), U.S. Navy (2 flights)

STS-48 Discovery — September 1991 — Pilot — Upper Atmosphere Research Satellite deployment
STS-60 Discovery — February 1994 — Pilot — SPACEHAB, Wake Shield Facility

=== Mission specialists ===
- Thomas D. Akers (born 1951), U.S. Air Force (4 flights)

STS-41 Discovery — October 1990 — Mission Specialist 3 — Ulysses/Inertial Upper Stage solar probe deployment
STS-49 Endeavour — May 1992 — Mission Specialist 4 — Intelsat VI hand-retrieval and repair
STS-61 Endeavour — December 1993 — Mission Specialist 5 — First Hubble Space Telescope servicing mission
STS-79 Atlantis — September 1996 — Mission Specialist 1 — Fourth Shuttle-Mir docking

- N. Jan Davis (born 1953), Engineer (3 flights)

STS-47 Endeavour — September 1992 — Mission Specialist 2 — Spacelab-J, Japan-funded Spacelab mission
STS-60 Discovery — February 1994 — Mission Specialist 1 — SPACEHAB, Wake Shield Facility
STS-85 Discovery — August 1997 — Payload Commander — Deployed and retrieved CRISTA-SPAS

- C. Michael Foale (born 1957), Astrophysicist (6 flights)

STS-45 Atlantis — March 1992 — Mission Specialist 3 — ATLAS-1 science platform
STS-56 Discovery — April 1993 — Mission Specialist 1 — ATLAS-2 science platform
STS-63 Discovery — February 1995 — Mission Specialist 1 — First Shuttle-Mir rendezvous, SPACEHAB
STS-84 Atlantis — May 1997 — Mission Specialist 5 (launched only) — Sixth Shuttle-Mir docking
Mir EO-23/Mir EO-24 — May 1997–October 1997 — Flight Engineer 2
STS-86 Atlantis — October 1997 — Mission Specialist 5 (landed only) — Seventh Shuttle-Mir docking
STS-103 Discovery — December 1999 — Mission Specialist 3 — Third Hubble Space Telescope servicing mission
Soyuz TMA-3 — October 2003–April 2004 — Flight Engineer — ISS crew rotation
ISS Expedition 8 — October 2003–April 2004 — ISS Commander

- Gregory J. Harbaugh (born 1956), Engineer (4 flights)

STS-39 Discovery — April 1991 — Mission Specialist 2 — First unclassified DoD mission, military science experiments
STS-54 Endeavour — January 1993 — Mission Specialist 2 – Tracking and data relay satellite (TDRS-F) deployment
STS-71 Atlantis — June 1995 — Mission Specialist 1 — First Shuttle-Mir docking
STS-82 Discovery — February 1997 — Mission Specialist 3 — Second Hubble Space Telescope servicing mission

- Mae C. Jemison (born 1956), Physician (1 flight)

STS-47 Endeavour — September 1992 — Mission Specialist 4 — Spacelab-J, Japan-funded Spacelab mission

- Bruce E. Melnick (born 1949), U.S. Coast Guard (2 flights)

STS-41 Discovery — October 1990 — Mission Specialist 1 — Ulysses/Inertial Upper Stage solar probe deployment
STS-49 Endeavour — May 1992 — Mission Specialist 2 — Intelsat VI hand-retrieval and repair

- Mario Runco, Jr. (born 1952), U.S. Navy (3 flights)

STS-44 Atlantis — November 1991 — Mission Specialist 2 — DSP satellite deployment
STS-54 Endeavour — January 1993 — Mission Specialist 1 – Tracking and data relay satellite (TDRS-F) deployment
STS-77 Endeavour — May 1996 — Mission Specialist 3 — SPACEHAB, SPARTAN

- James S. Voss (born 1949), U.S. Army (5 flights)

STS-44 Atlantis — November 1991 — Mission Specialist 3 — DSP satellite deployment
STS-53 Discovery — December 1992 — Mission Specialist 2 — Partially classified 10th and final DoD mission, likely deployment of SDS2 satellite
STS-69 Endeavour — September 1995 — Mission Specialist 1 — Wake Shield Facility, SPARTAN
STS-101 Atlantis — May 2000 — Mission Specialist 3 — ISS supply
STS-102 Discovery — March 2001 — Mission Specialist 4 (launched only) — ISS supply and crew rotation
ISS Expedition 2 — March 2001–August 2001 — Flight Engineer 2
STS-105 Discovery — August 2001 — Mission Specialist 4 (landed only) — ISS supply and crew rotation

== Further information ==
The group's informal nickname is an acronym for "George Abbey Final Fifteen". Of this group, Mae Jemison would become the first female African-American in space, Bruce Melnick the first Coast Guard aviator in space, while Michael Foale would fly aboard the Mir space station. At the time of the Columbia accident in 2003, William Readdy was Associate Administrator for Space Flight and Kenneth Bowersox was commanding the Expedition 6 crew on the ISS. Chilton, after leaving NASA, became the first NASA astronaut to become a General in the U.S. Air Force (Lt. Gen. Thomas Stafford, USAF, and VADM Richard Truly, USN were three-star officers) and was commander of U.S. Strategic Command from October 2007 until January 2011.

== See also ==
- List of astronauts by name
- List of astronauts by selection
- List of space travelers by name
- List of space travelers by nationality
