= Westwood Heights Schools =

School district in Michigan

Address
- 3425 W Pierson Road Flint, Genesee County, Michigan, 48504; United States
- Coordinates: 43°03′27.6″N 83°45′04.2″W

District information
- Grades: PreKindergarten–12
- Superintendent: Les Key
- Schools: 5
- Budget: $28,765,000 2022-2023 expenditures
- NCES District ID: 2635970

Students and staff
- Students: 1,188 (2024-2025)
- Teachers: 70.3 (on an FTE basis) (2024-2025)
- Staff: 222.1 FTE (2024-2025)
- Student–teacher ratio: 16.9 (2024-2025)
- Colors: Columbia blue and white

Other information
- Intermediate District: Genesee
- Website: www.hamadyhawks.net

Westwood Heights Schools is a public school district in the Flint, Michigan area. It serves parts of Beecher, Mt. Morris Township, and Flint.

== History ==
Westwood Heights Schools was established in 1957 with the merger of Beckwith and Payson school districts. At the time, the district had 1,100 students in four schools, with high school students attending Flint Community Schools. The district's name was chosen by the district from student submissions. Eighty-four students submitted the name Westwood Heights, and a student was randomly chosen from them to receive a $25 savings bond.

In 1958, voters passed a bond issue to build a high school, which would be named after Michael H. Hamady, a Lebanese real-estate developer who donated land for the school. Hamady was the father of Robert M. Hamady, founder of the Hamady supermarket chain. By February 1959, plans had been drawn by S.A. Nurmi's Flint architecture firm and construction bids were being accepted. The school opened in fall 1960 but was not dedicated until November 12, 1961.

The current Hamady Middle/High School, designed by the firm Tomblinson and Harburn Associates of Flint, opened around January 1971. However, the district was in a financial crisis at the time due to rising expenditures, and three schools were closed. Hamady Junior High School (currently site of Academy West Alternative High School) moved to the former high school, and Payton Elementary at 3415 North Linden Road and Beckwith Elementary at 3178 West Ridgeway Road were shuttered. Three elementary schools then remained in the district. Meanwhile, male students' campaign to be allowed to grow their hair long, grow mustaches and sideburns received media attention when the school board insisted on the dress code despite protests.

Another financial crisis occurred in 1984, compounded by a failed millage vote. The district had 2,250 students and 104 teachers in 1974, but ten years later, enrollment had declined to 1,304 students. Gillespie Elementary was closed, leaving Hamady and Westwood Elementaries.

Colonel Donald McMonagle Elementary, formed from the merger of Hamady and Westwood Elementaries, opened in fall 2007 in the 1960 high school building. It was named after a graduate of Westwood Heights Schools, astronaut Colonel Donald McMonagle, who graduated from Hamady High School in 1970. He commanded a 1994 mission on the Space Shuttle Atlantis. Hamady Elementary ultimately reopened as a school for kindergarten and first grade.

Amidst rapid turnover of superintendents, the district was emerging from another financial crisis in 2013. It had also overcome the threat of dissolution by the state. As neighboring Flint Community Schools' enrollment declined overall between 2000 and 2023, Westwood Heights' enrollment has varied wildly. After a steady decline, it increased annually between 2013 and 2022, but has fallen sharply between 2022 and 2025. During this period, public school enrollment declined across Michigan, especially in Genesee County, placing continued financial pressure on the district.

== Schools ==
Schools in Westwood Heights Schools district
School	Address	Notes
Hamady Community High School	3223 W Carpenter Road, Flint	Grades 9–12. Built 1971.
Hamady Middle School	3223 W Carpenter Road, Flint	Grades 7-8. Shares a building with Hamady High School.
Colonel Donald McMonagle Elementary	3484 N Jennings Road, Flint	Grades 2-6. Built 1960.
Hamady Elementary	3227 Finney Court, Flint	Grades K-1
Academy West Alternative Education	3223 W Carpenter Road, Flint	Alternative high school
