= TDRS-6 =

American communications satellite

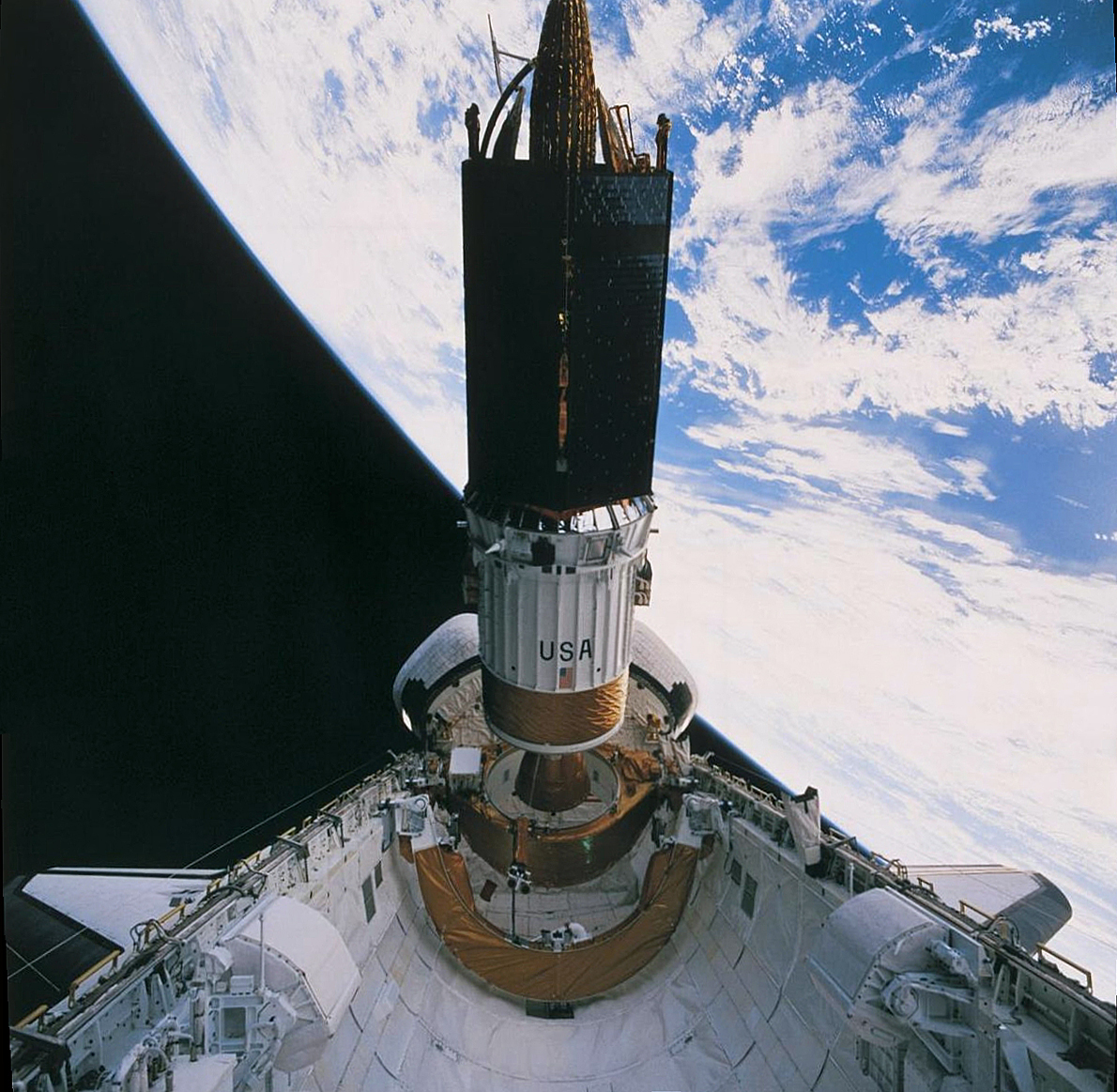
- TDRS-F being deployed from Endeavour
- Mission type: Communication
- Operator: NASA
- COSPAR ID: 1993-003B
- SATCAT no.: 22314
- Mission duration: Planned: 10 years Elapsed: 33 years, 3 months, 11 days

Spacecraft properties
- Bus: TDRS
- Manufacturer: TRW
- Launch mass: 2,108 kg (4,647 lb)
- Dimensions: 17.3 × 14.2 m (57 × 47 ft)
- Power: 1700 watts

Start of mission
- Launch date: 13 January 1993, 13:59:30 UTC
- Rocket: Space Shuttle Endeavour; STS-54 / IUS
- Launch site: Kennedy Space Center LC-39B
- Contractor: Rockwell International

Orbital parameters
- Reference system: Geocentric
- Regime: Geostationary
- Longitude: 46.0° West (1994–1996); 47.0° West (1996–2005); 174.0° West (2005–)
- Epoch: 14 January 1993

TDRS-6, known before launch as TDRS-F, is an American communications satellite, of first generation, which is operated by NASA as part of the Tracking and Data Relay Satellite System. It was constructed by TRW, and is based on a custom satellite bus which was used for all seven first generation TDRS satellites.

== History ==
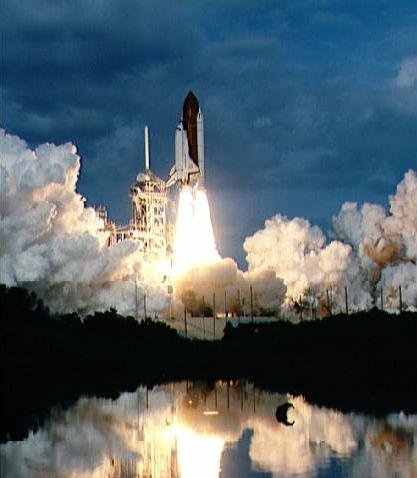
The launch of STS-54, carrying TDRS-F

TDRS-F was deployed from Space Shuttle Endeavour during the STS-54 mission in 1993. Endeavour was launched from Launch Complex 39B at the Kennedy Space Center, at 13:59:30 UTC on 13 January 1993. TDRS-F was deployed from Endeavour around six hours after launch, and was raised to geosynchronous orbit by means of an Inertial Upper Stage.

=== Deployment ===
The two-stage solid-propellent Inertial Upper Stage made two burns. The first stage burn occurred shortly after deployment from Endeavour, and placed the satellite into a geosynchronous transfer orbit (GTO). At 02:26 UTC on 14 January 1993, it reached apogee, and the second stage fired, placing TDRS-F into geosynchronous orbit. At this point, it received its operational designation, TDRS-6.

=== Operation ===
In 1994, it was placed at a longitude 46.0° West of the Greenwich Meridian, to serve as an on-orbit spare. In 1996, it was moved to 47.0° West, where it remained until 2005, when it was repositioned to 174.0° West, where, as of August 2009, it was used to provide communications with spacecraft in Earth orbit, such as the International Space Station (ISS) and spacecraft bringing astronauts to the ISS.

Location of TDRS as of 26 May 2020

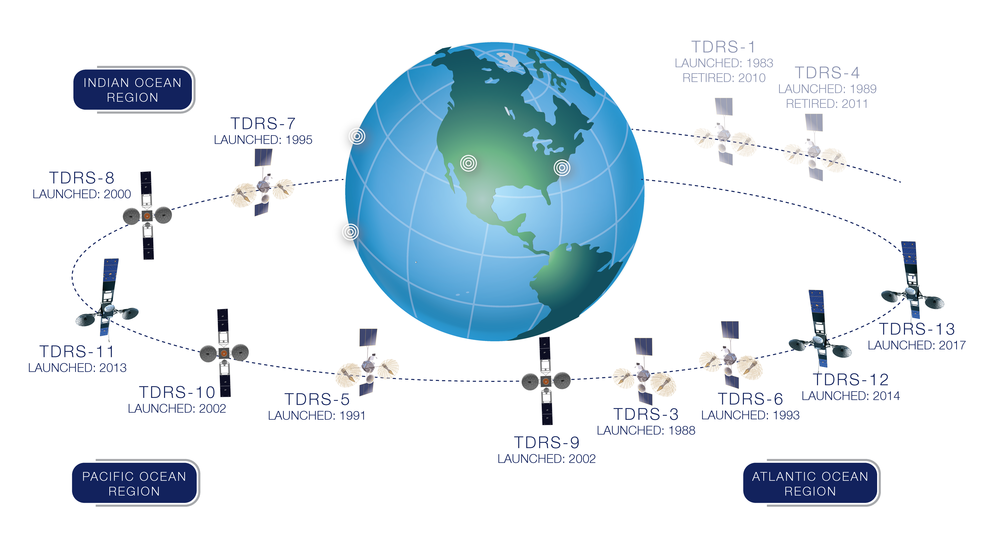
Location of TDRS as of 18 March 2019

== See also ==
- List of TDRS satellites
