= Susan Helms =

American astronaut and Air Force lieutenant general (born 1958)

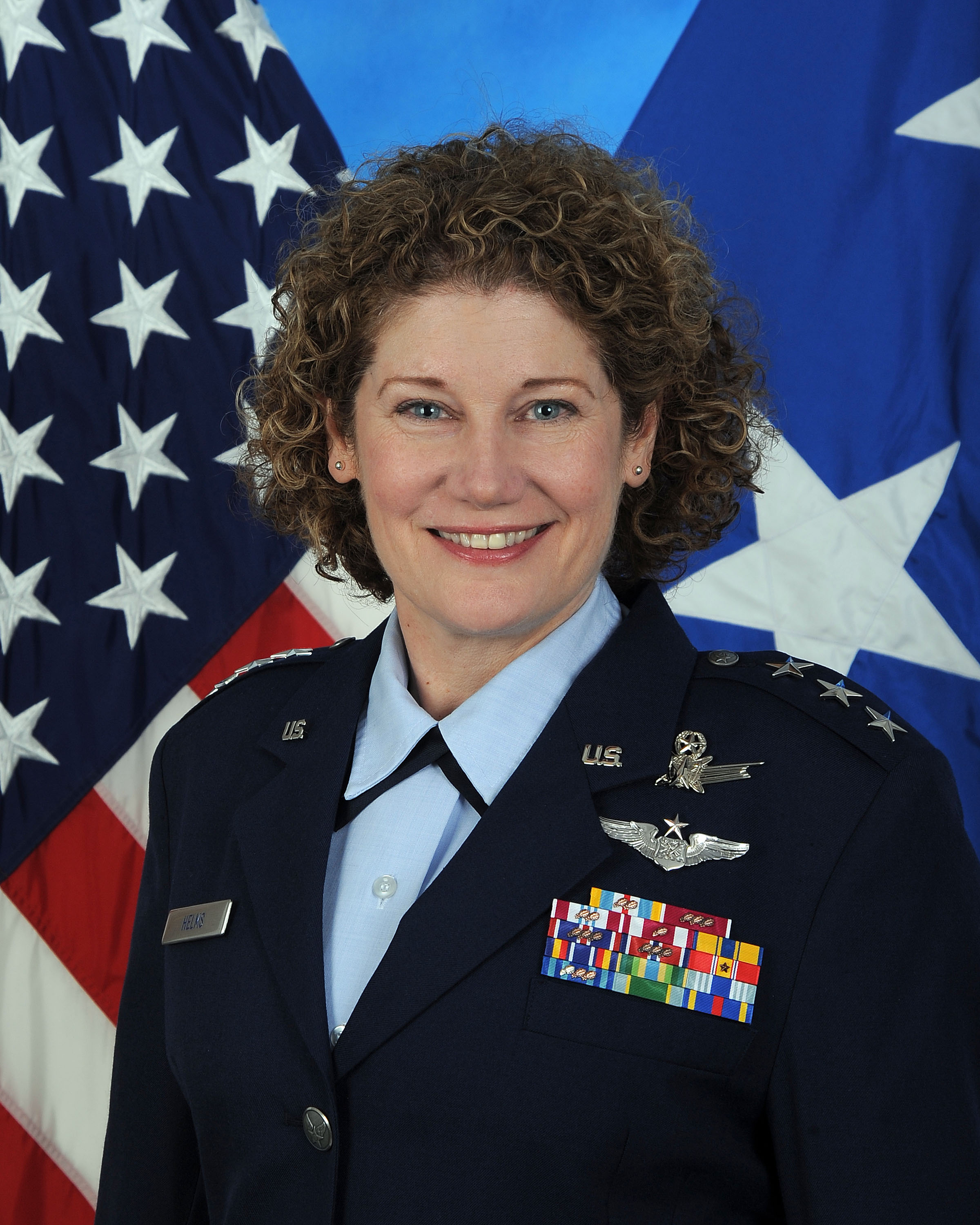
- Born: February 26, 1958 (age 68); Charlotte, North Carolina, U.S.
- Education: United States Air Force Academy (BS); Stanford University (MS)
- Awards: Defense Superior Service Medal (3); Legion of Merit (4); Defense Meritorious Service Medal (3)
- Space career

NASA astronaut
- Rank: Lieutenant General, USAF
- Time in space: 210d 23h 6m
- Selection: NASA Group 13 (1990)
- Total EVAs: 1
- Total EVA time: 8h 56m
- Mission: STS-54; STS-64; STS-78; STS-101; Expedition 2 (STS-102 / STS-105)
- Military career
- Service years: 1980–2014
- Units: United States Strategic Command

Susan Jane Helms (born February 26, 1958) is a retired United States Air Force lieutenant general and NASA astronaut. She was the commander, 14th Air Force (Air Forces Strategic); and commander, Joint Functional Component Command for Space at Vandenberg Air Force Base in California.

Helms was a crew member on five Space Shuttle missions and was a resident of the International Space Station (ISS) for over five months in 2001.

Helms officially retired from the United States Air Force in 2014.

In 2020, she was elected a member of the National Academy of Engineering for accomplishments in civil and military space programs.

== Personal life ==
Helms was born in Charlotte, North Carolina, but considers Portland, Oregon, to be her hometown. She enjoys piano and other musical activities, jogging, traveling, reading, computers, and cooking. She resides in Colorado Springs, Colorado. Her parents, Lieutenant Colonel (retired, USAF) Pat and Dori Helms, reside in Denver, Colorado. She has three sisters.

== Military career ==
Helms graduated with a bachelor of science in aeronautical engineering from the U.S. Air Force Academy in 1980. She received her commission and was assigned to Eglin Air Force Base, Florida, as an F-16 weapons separation engineer with the Air Force Armament Laboratory. In 1982, she became the lead engineer for F-15 weapons separation. In 1984, she was selected to attend graduate school. She received a Master of Science in Aeronautics and Astronautics from Stanford University in 1985 and was assigned as an assistant professor of aeronautics at the U.S. Air Force Academy. In 1987, she attended the Air Force Test Pilot School at Edwards Air Force Base, California. After completing one year of training as a flight test engineer, Helms was assigned as a USAF Exchange Officer to the Aerospace Engineering Test Establishment, at Canadian Forces Base Cold Lake in Alberta, Canada, where she worked as a flight test engineer and project officer on the CF-18 aircraft. She was managing the development of a CF-18 flight control system simulation for the Canadian Forces when selected for the astronaut program.

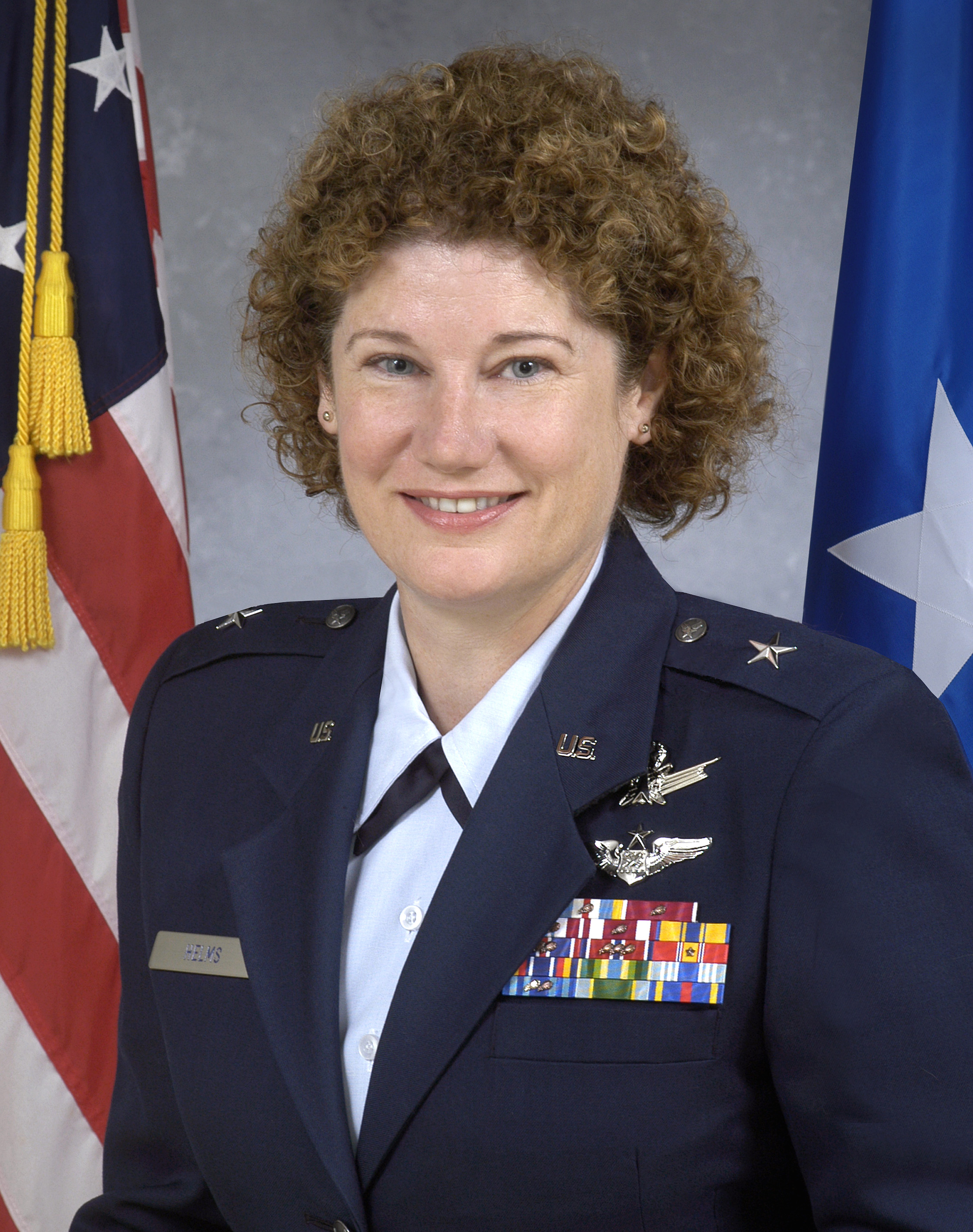
Helms as a brigadier general in the U.S. Air Force

After a 12-year NASA career that included 211 days in space, Helms returned to the U.S. Air Force in July 2002 to take a position at HQ USAF Space Command. After a stint as the division chief of the Space Superiority Division of the Requirements Directorate of Air Force Space Command in Colorado Springs, Colorado, she served as vice commander of the 45th Space Wing at Patrick Air Force Base near Cape Canaveral, Florida. She then served as deputy director of operations (Technical Training) for Air Education and Training Command at Randolph Air Force Base near San Antonio, Texas. Helms served on the Return To Flight task group after the Columbia accident. She was promoted to brigadier general in June 2006 and became commander of the 45th Space Wing on the same day of her promotion.

Helms was promoted to major general in August 2009. She served as the director of plans and policy, U.S. Strategic Command, Offutt Air Force Base, Nebraska. She was directly responsible to the U.S. Strategic Command commander for the development and implementation of national security policy and guidance; military strategy and guidance; space and weapons employment concepts and policy; and joint doctrine as they apply to the command and the execution of its missions. She was also responsible for the development of the nation's strategic war plan, strategic support plans for theater combatant commanders and contingency planning for the global strike mission.

In January 2011, Helms was promoted to lieutenant general and assumed duties as commander, 14th Air Force (Air Forces Strategic), Air Force Space Command and commander, Joint Functional Component Command for Space, US Strategic Command

As a flight test engineer, Helms has flown in 30 different types of U.S. and Canadian military aircraft.

In 2013, Helms was nominated by President Barack Obama to become vice commander of the Air Force Space Command. Senator Claire McCaskill placed a permanent hold on the nomination because Helms had dismissed a charge of a sexual assault and punished the accused on a lesser charge leading to his dismissal from the USAF, in her role as the General Court-Martial Convening Authority, who is required to review all findings. As Helms's lawyer explained, Helms felt the prosecution had failed to prove its case beyond a reasonable doubt. Obama eventually withdrew Helms's nomination and she retired from the Air Force in 2014.

== Spaceflight experience ==
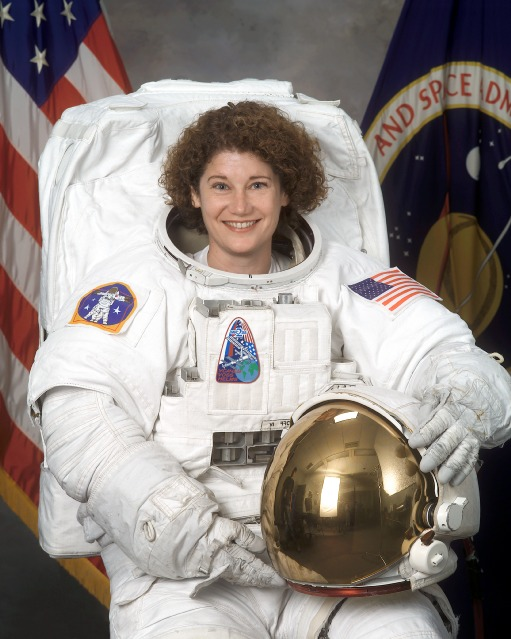
NASA portrait of Helms

Selected by NASA in January 1990, Helms became an astronaut in July 1991. She flew on STS-54 (1993), STS-64 (1994), STS-78 (1996), STS-101 (2000) and served aboard the International Space Station as a member of the ISS Expedition 2 crew (2001). A veteran of five space flights, Helms logged 5,064 hours in space, including an EVA of 8 hours and 56 minutes (world record at the time).

STS-54 Endeavour, January 13–19, 1993. The primary objective of this mission was the deployment of a $200-million NASA Tracking and Data Relay Satellite (TDRS-F). A diffuse X-ray spectrometer (DXS) carried in the payload bay, collected over 80,000 seconds of quality X-ray data that will enable investigators to answer questions about the origin of the Milky Way galaxy. The crew demonstrated the physics principles of everyday toys to an interactive audience of elementary school students across the United States. A highly successful extra-vehicular activity (EVA) resulted in many lessons learned that will benefit International Space Station assembly. Mission duration was 5 days, 23 hours, 38 minutes, 17 seconds.

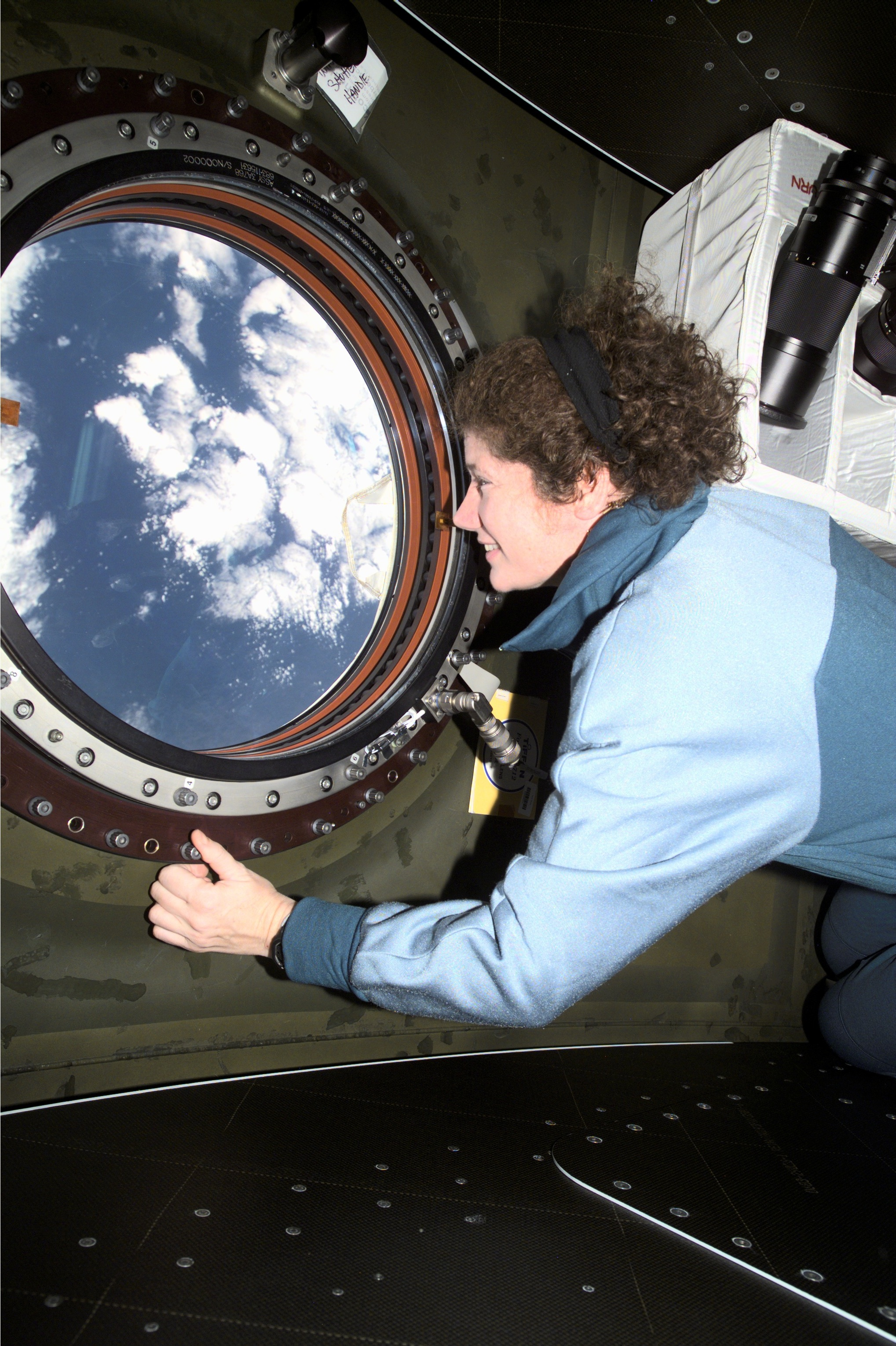
Helms views the topography of a point on Earth from the nadir window of the ISS.

STS-64 Discovery, September 9–20, 1994. On this flight, Helms served as the flight engineer for orbiter operations and the primary RMS operator aboard Space Shuttle. The major objective of this flight was to validate the design and operating characteristics of Lidar in Space Technology Experiment (LITE) by gathering data about the Earth's troposphere and stratosphere. Additional objectives included the deploy and retrieval of SPARTAN-201, a free-flying satellite that investigated the physics of the solar corona, and the testing of a new EVA maneuvering device. The Shuttle Plume Impingement Flight Experiment (SPIFEX) was used to collect extensive data on the effects of jet thruster impingement, in preparation for proximity tasks such as space station docking. Mission duration was 10 days, 22 hours, 51 minutes.

STS-78 Columbia, June 20 to July 7, 1996, Helms was the payload commander and flight engineer aboard Columbia, on the longest Space Shuttle mission to date (later that year the STS-80 mission broke its record by nineteen hours). The mission included studies sponsored by ten nations and five space agencies, and was the first mission to combine both a full microgravity studies agenda and a comprehensive life science investigation. The Life and Microgravity Spacelab mission served as a model for future studies on board the International Space Station. Mission duration was 16 days, 21 hours, 48 minutes.

STS-101 Atlantis, May 19–29, 2000, was a mission dedicated to the delivery and repair of critical hardware for the International Space Station. Helms’s prime responsibilities during this mission were to perform critical repairs to extend the life of the Functional Cargo Block (FGB). In addition, she had prime responsibility of the onboard computer network and served as the mission specialist for rendezvous with the ISS. Mission duration was 9 days, 20 hours and 9 minutes.

Expedition 2 March 8 to August 22, 2001, was a mission to the International Space Station and Helms was a member of the second crew to inhabit the International Space Station Alpha. The Expedition 2 crew (two American astronauts and one Russian cosmonaut) launched on March 8, 2001, on board STS-102 Discovery and successfully docked with the station on March 9, 2001. The Expedition 2 crew installed and conducted tests on the Canadian-made Space Station Robotic arm (SSRMS), conducted internal and external maintenance tasks (Russian and American), in addition to medical and science experiments. During her stay on board, Helms installed the airlock (brought up on the STS-104 mission) using the SSRM. She and her crewmates also performed a 'fly around' of the Russian Soyuz spacecraft and welcomed the visiting Soyuz crew that included the first space tourist, Dennis Tito. On March 11 she performed a world-record 8 hour and 56 minute spacewalk to install hardware to the external body of the laboratory module, that stood until 17 December 2024, when Cai Xuzhe broke the record with Song Lingdong for the longest spacewalk in human history, of 9 hours and 6 minutes. Helms spent a total of 163 days aboard the space station. She returned to Earth with the STS-105 crew aboard Discovery on August 22, 2001.

== Awards and decorations ==
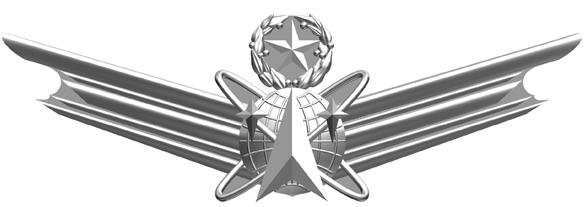
Command Space Operations Badge
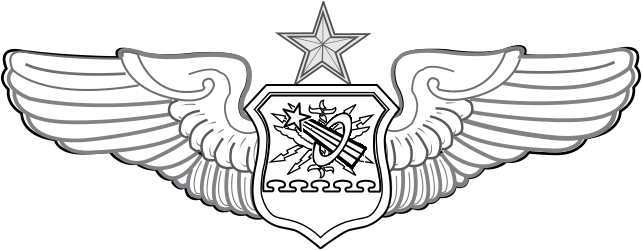
Air Force Senior Observer Badge with Astronaut Device

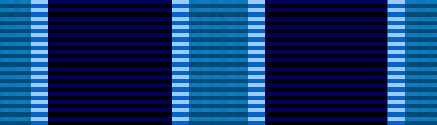
Defense Superior Service Medal with two oak leaf clusters
Legion of Merit with three oak leaf clusters
Defense Meritorious Service Medal with two oak leaf clusters
Meritorious Service Medal with oak leaf cluster
Air Force Commendation Medal
Outstanding Unit Award with three oak leaf clusters
Organizational Excellence Award with three oak leaf clusters
NASA Distinguished Service Medal
NASA Outstanding Leadership Medal
National Defense Service Medal with service star
Global War on Terrorism Service Medal
Armed Forces Service Medal
Air Force Overseas Long Tour Service Ribbon
Air Force Longevity Service Award with silver and two bronze oak leaf clusters
Small Arms Expert Marksmanship Ribbon
Air Force Training Ribbon
Medal "For Merit in Space Exploration"

Helms was inducted into the International Space Hall of Fame in 2004. She was inducted into the Colorado Women's Hall of Fame in 2018.

== Dates of rank ==
Promotions
Insignia	Rank	Date
	Lieutenant General	January 21, 2011
	Major General	August 2, 2009
	Brigadier General	June 23, 2006
	Colonel	February 1, 2000
	Lieutenant Colonel	March 1, 1994
	Major	October 1, 1991
	Captain	May 28, 1984
	First Lieutenant	May 28, 1982
	Second Lieutenant	May 28, 1980

== See also ==
- List of female United States military generals and flag officers
