= Gregory J. Harbaugh =

American astronaut and engineer (born 1956)

Greg Harbaugh
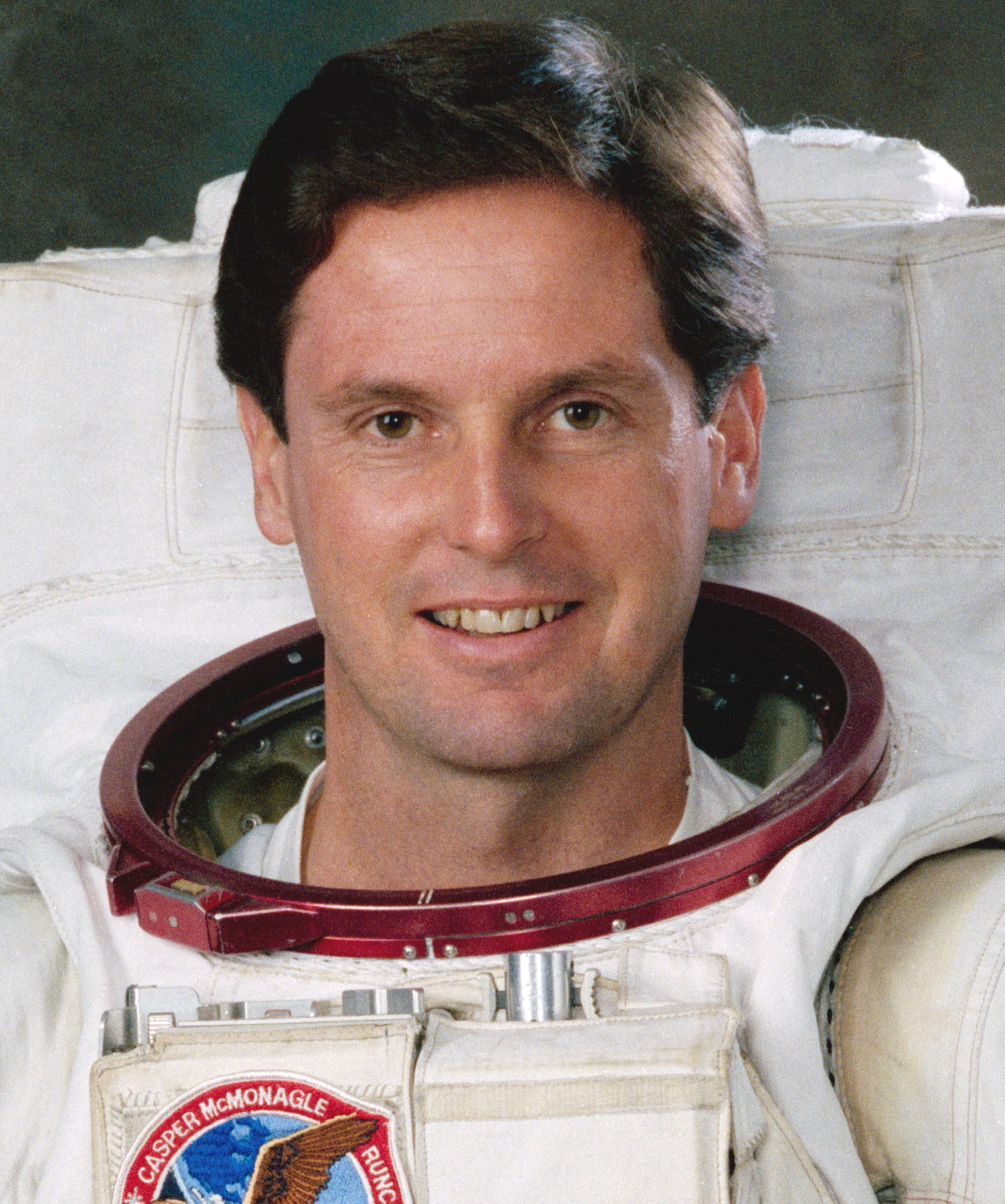
- NASA portrait, 1993
- Born: Gregory Jordan Harbaugh; April 15, 1956 (age 70); Cleveland, Ohio, U.S.
- Education: Purdue University (BS); University of Houston (MS)
- Space career

NASA astronaut
- Time in space: 34d 1h 59m
- Selection: NASA Group 12 (1987)
- Total EVAs: 3
- Total EVA time: 18h, 29m
- Mission: STS-39; STS-54; STS-71; STS-82
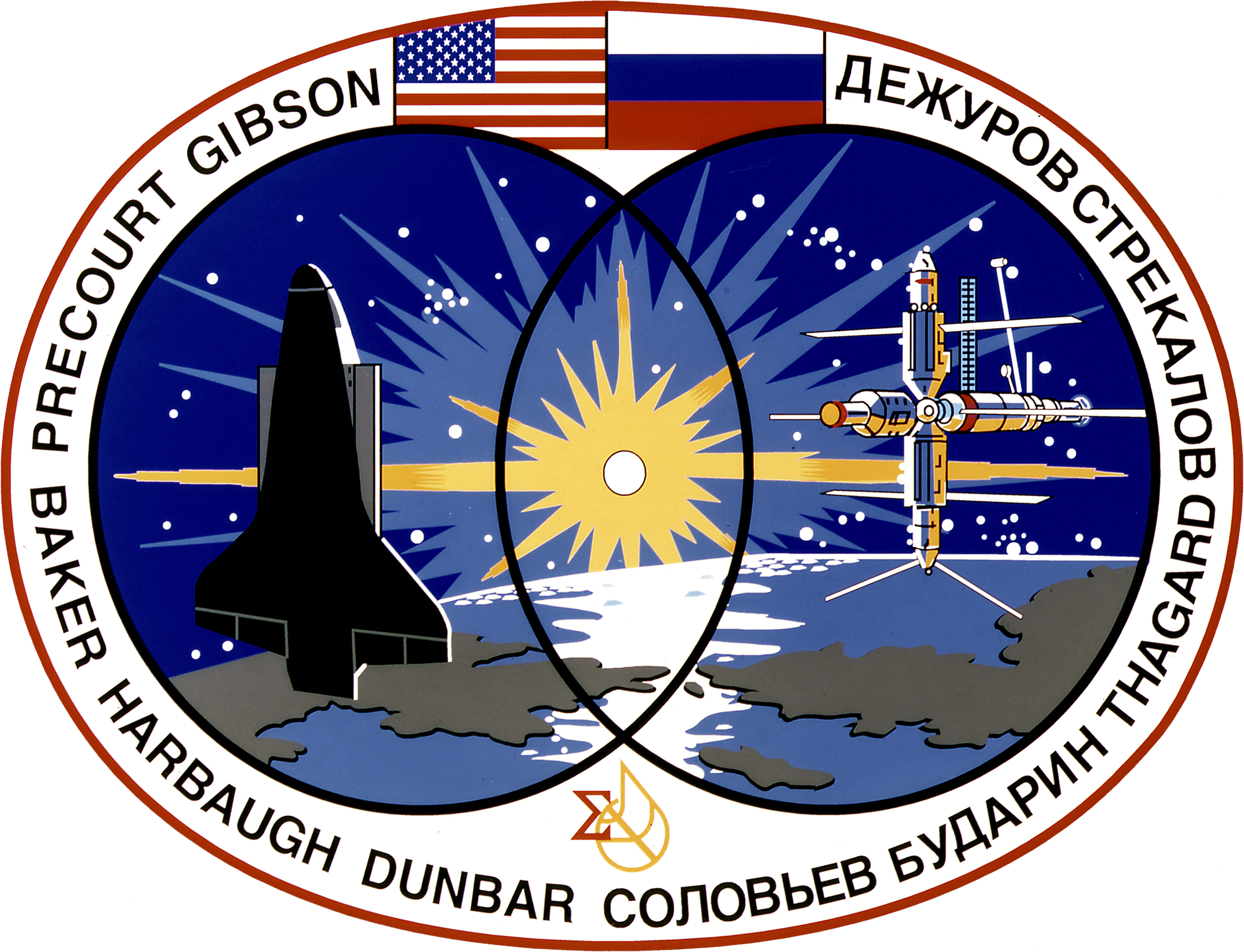
- Mission insignia

Gregory Jordan Harbaugh (born April 15, 1956) is an aeronautical/astronautical engineer and retired NASA astronaut. He flew on four space shuttle missions as a mission specialist with responsibilities that included Remote Manipulator System (RMS) operation and Extravehicular Activity (EVAs). He performed three spacewalks during the shuttle missions including in support of repair/refurbishment of the Hubble Space Telescope.

== Background and education ==
Harbaugh was born April 15, 1956, in Cleveland, Ohio, and grew up in Willoughby, Ohio. Harbaugh graduated from Willoughby South High School in 1974 and went on to receive a Bachelor of Science degree in Aeronautical and Astronautical Engineering from Purdue University in 1978 and a Master of Science in Physical Science from University of Houston–Clear Lake in 1986. He is married with three adult children. He currently resides with his wife Carol in southern Wisconsin.

== Career ==
=== NASA experience ===
Harbaugh came to NASA's Johnson Space Center after graduation from Purdue University in 1978. He held engineering and technical management positions in Space Shuttle flight operations, and supported Shuttle flight operations from Mission Control for most of the flights from STS-1 through STS-51-L. He served as Lead Data Processing Systems (DPS) Officer for STS-9 (Spacelab-1) and STS-41-D, Orbit DPS for STS-41-B and STS-41-C, and Ascent/Entry DPS for STS-41-G. He also served as a senior flight controller addressing issues requiring real-time resolution, for several flights from STS-51-A through STS-51-L.

Harbaugh has a commercial pilot's license with instrument rating, and over 1600 hours total flying time.

Selected by NASA in June 1987, Harbaugh became an astronaut in August 1988. His technical assignments included work in the Shuttle Avionics Integration Laboratory (SAIL), the Shuttle Remote Manipulator System (RMS), telerobotics systems development for Space Station, the Hubble Space Telescope servicing mission development, spacecraft communicator (CAPCOM) in Mission Control, and extravehicular activity (EVA) for the International Space Station (ISS). He was assigned as the backup EVA crew member and capsule communicator (Capcom) for STS-61, the first Hubble Space Telescope servicing mission.

A veteran of four space flights, Harbaugh has logged a total of 818 hours in space, including 18 hours, 29 minutes EVA. From 1997 to 2001 Harbaugh served as Manager of the Extravehicular Activity Project Office, with program management responsibility for all aspects of NASA's spacewalk industry, including spacesuits, tools, training, tasks and operations for the Space Shuttle, the International Space Station, and future planetary missions. Harbaugh left NASA in March 2001.

=== Space flight experience ===
==== STS-39 ====
STS-39 Discovery (April 28 through May 6, 1991) was an eight-day unclassified Department of Defense mission involving research for the Strategic Defense Initiative. Harbaugh flew as a mission specialist and was responsible for operation of the RMS and the Infrared Background Signature Survey (IBSS) spacecraft, and he was one of two crewmen trained for EVA in the event of a contingency requiring a spacewalk. Mission duration was 199 hours, 22 minutes.

==== STS-54 ====
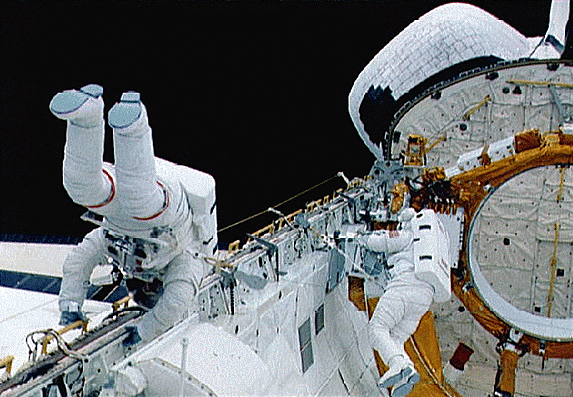
Harbaugh (in spacesuit with red stripes) and fellow astronaut Mario Runco, Jr. performing an EVA during the STS-54 mission

STS-54 Endeavour (January 13–19, 1993) was a six-day mission which featured the deployment of TDRS-F, and a 4-hour 28-minute space walk by Harbaugh. Mission duration was 143 hours 38 minutes.

==== STS-71 ====
STS-71 Atlantis (June 27 to July 7, 1995) was the first docking mission with the Russian Space Station Mir, and involved an exchange of crews. On this mission, Harbaugh served as the Flight Engineer (Mission Specialist) on a seven-member (up) eight-member (down) crew. Space Shuttle Atlantis was modified to carry a docking system compatible with the Russian Mir Space Station, and Harbaugh was responsible for the inflight operation of the docking system. He was also assigned to perform any contingency EVA. Mission duration was 235 hours, 23 minutes.

==== STS-82 ====
STS-82 Discovery (February 11–21, 1997) the second Hubble Space Telescope (HST) servicing mission. It was a night launch and landing flight. During the 10-day mission, the crew retrieved and secured the HST in Discovery's payload bay. In five spacewalks, two teams installed two new spectrometers and eight replacement instruments, and placed insulation patches over several compartments containing key data processing, electronics and scientific instrument telemetry packages. Harbaugh participated in two spacewalks, totaling 14 hours and 01 minute. Following completion of upgrades and repairs, HST was redeployed and boosted to its highest orbit ever. Mission duration was 239 hours, 37 minutes.

=== Special honors ===
Recipient of the NASA Distinguished Service Medal, four NASA Space Flight Medals, the NASA Exceptional Service Medal, the NASA Exceptional Achievement Medal, the 1999 Rotary National Award for Space Achievement "Stellar" Award for Outstanding Leadership, the 1995 American Astronautical Society Flight Achievement Award, the Johns Hopkins University Presidential Medal, the Purdue University Outstanding Aerospace Engineer and Astronaut Alumnus Awards, Aviation Week & Space Technology Laurels for 1991 (STS 39) and 1995 (STS 71), and the Sigma Chi Fraternity Significant Sig award. Inducted into the Order of Constantine, the highest honor bestowed upon members of Sigma Chi for commitment, dedication and service to the fraternity (2017).

=== Post NASA career ===
- Museum Director and COO of Sun 'n Fun Fly-in, Inc., Lakeland, FL 2001-2006
- CEO/President of the Sigma Chi Foundation, Evanston, IL 2006-2016
- Currently Founder/Chairman/CEO of InnerSpace Consultants

== Organizations ==
- Member, Sigma Chi fraternity, Omicron Delta Kappa, Sigma Gamma Tau
