= Mario Runco Jr. =

American astronaut (born 1952)

Mario Runco
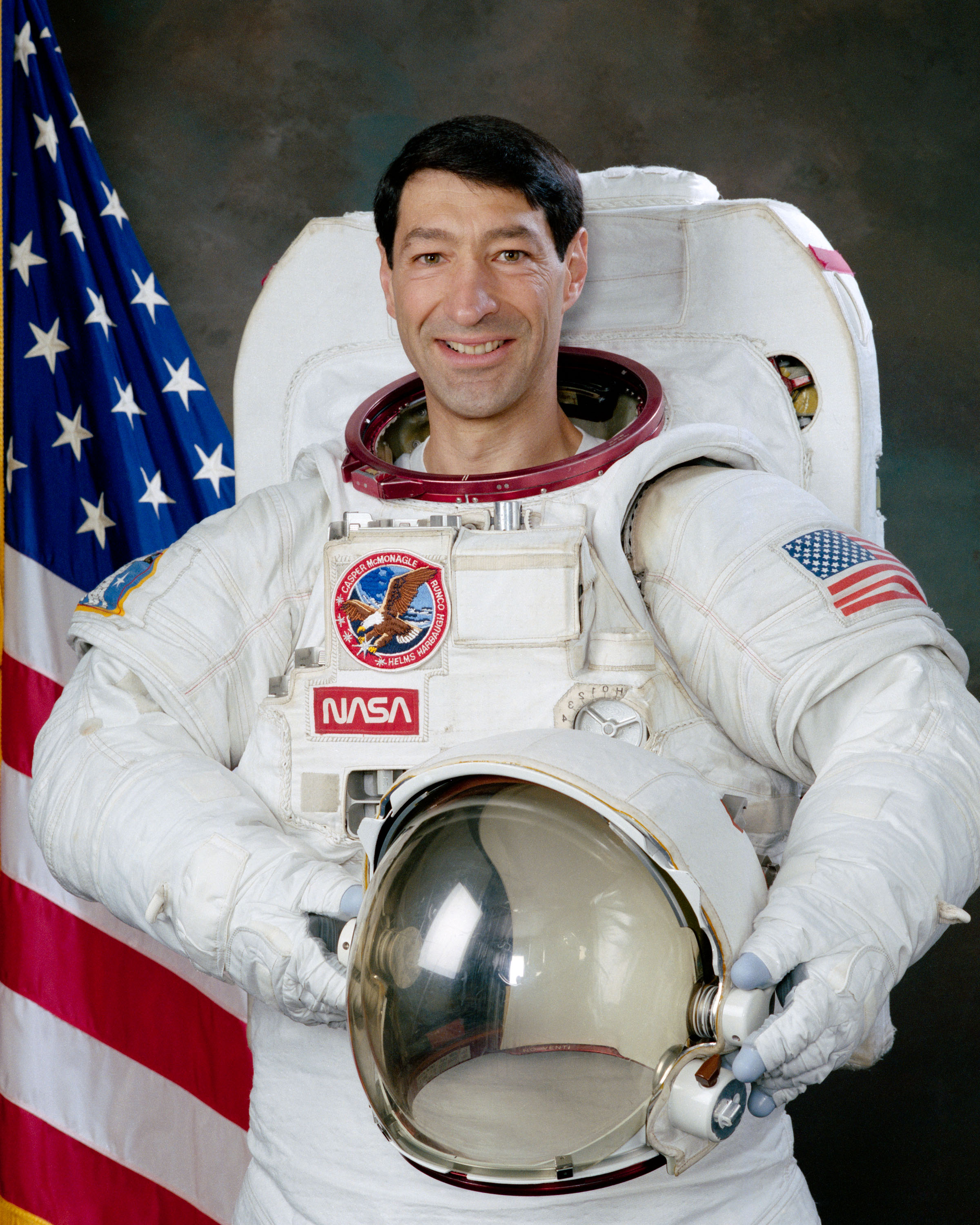
- Born: January 26, 1952 (age 74); New York City, New York, U.S.
- Education: City College of New York (BS); Rutgers University, New Brunswick (MS)
- Space career

NASA astronaut
- Rank: Lieutenant Commander, USN (ret.)
- Time in space: 22d 23h 8m
- Selection: NASA Group 12 (1987)
- Total EVAs: 1
- Total EVA time: 4h 28m
- Missions: STS-44; STS-54; STS-77

Mario Runco Jr. is a former United States Naval officer and NASA astronaut. He was selected as an astronaut with in 1987. He flew three Space Shuttle missions, performed a spacewalk on his second mission, and is now retired both from NASA and the U.S. Navy.

== Early life and education ==
Mario Runco, Jr. was born on January 26, 1952, in The Bronx, New York, to Mario and Filomena Ragusa Runco. Raised in the Highbridge neighborhood of The Bronx, his family moved to Yonkers, New York, in his early teen years. Runco graduated from Sacred Heart School, in the Bronx, NY in 1966 and Cardinal Hayes High School, the Bronx, NY in 1970. He earned a bachelor of science degree in meteorology and physical oceanography from the City College of New York in 1974 and a master of science degree in meteorology from Rutgers University in 1976. He played intercollegiate ice hockey on the City College of New York and Rutgers University teams.

== Special honors ==
He was awarded the Defense Superior Service Medal, Defense Meritorious Service Medal, NASA Exceptional Service Medal, Navy Achievement Medal and Navy Pistol Expert Medal. He was also awarded three NASA Space Flight Medals (STS-44, STS-54 and STS-77), two Navy Sea Service Ribbons (USS NASSAU [LHA-4] and USNS CHAUVENET [T-AGS-29]), and the Navy Battle Efficiency Ribbon (USS NASSAU [LHA-4]). He received a Rotary National Space Achievement Stellar Team Award (2002) for his work on the International Space Station’s (ISS’s) Science Window and the Window Observational Research Facility (WORF), He was also the recipient of the City College of New York's Townsend Harris Medal (1993), and the Cardinal Hayes High School Cardinal Francis Joseph Spellman Award (1993). As an undergraduate, he received the City College of New York Class of 1938 Athletic Service Award and is believed to be the first person of Italian origin to fly in space, being decorated accordingly by the president of Italy in 1999. He received an honorary doctor of science degree from the City College of New York in 1999.

== Early career ==
Working at various positions even through his school years, Runco worked continuously from age nine until his retirement on December 31, 2017, eventually accumulating 57 years of continuous employment and almost 48 years of federal service with four different federal agencies (USPOD/USPS, USGS, USN, and NASA). After graduating from Rutgers University, he worked for a year as a research hydrologist conducting ground water surveys for the United States Geological Survey on Long Island, New York. In 1977, he joined the New Jersey State Police and, after completing training at the State Police Academy, he worked as a New Jersey State Trooper until he entered the United States Navy in June 1978. Upon completion of Navy Officer Candidate School in Newport, Rhode Island, in September 1978, he was commissioned and assigned to the Naval Oceanographic and Atmospheric Research Laboratory then known as the Naval Environmental Prediction Research Facility (NEPRF) in Monterey, California, as a research meteorologist. From April 1981 to December 1983, he served as the Meteorological Officer aboard the amphibious assault ship USS NASSAU [LHA-4]. It was during this tour of duty that he earned his designation as a Naval Surface Warfare Officer. From January 1984 to December 1985, he worked as a laboratory instructor at the Naval Postgraduate School, specifically the Geophysics Technical Readiness Laboratory, in Monterey, California. From December 1985 to December 1986, he served as Commanding Officer of Oceanographic Unit 4 embarked in the naval survey vessel USNS CHAUVENET [T-AGS-29], conducting hydrographic and oceanographic surveys of the Makassar and Sunda Straits and the Flores and Java Seas, Indonesia. His last assignment within the Navy before being assigned to NASA was as Fleet Environmental Services Officer at the Naval Meteorology and Oceanography Command's Naval Western Meteorology and Oceanography Center, Pearl Harbor, Hawaii. He joined NASA in 1987 and remained on active duty as a NASA astronaut until 1994 after which he continued his NASA career as a civilian astronaut until his retirement.

== NASA tenure ==
Selected by NASA as an astronaut candidate in June 1987, Runco qualified for assignment as an astronaut mission specialist in August 1988. A veteran of three space flights (STS-44 in 1991, STS-54 in 1993, and STS-77 in 1996), Runco has logged over 551 hours in space which includes a 4.5 hour spacewalk during his STS-54 mission. His technical assignments included serving in Operations Development, where he assisted in the design, development and testing of the Space Shuttle crew escape system after the Challenger (Orbiter Vehicle {OV}-099) accident; in Mission Support, at the Shuttle Avionics Integration Laboratory (SAIL, OV-095) as a SAIL Commander, performing test and evaluation of Space Shuttle mission-specific flight software; at the Kennedy Space Center, as an Astronaut Support Person (ASP or "cape Crusader"), where he assisted in preparing Space Shuttle missions for launch supporting missions STS-81, 82, 83, 84, 94, 85, 86, 87, 88, 89, 90, & 91, and in the Johnson Space Center's Mission Control Center as a Capsule (Spacecraft) Communicator (CAPCOM) supporting missions STS-60, 62, 63, 65, 66, 67, 68, 92, 93, 96, 97, 98, 99, 101, 104, 105, 106, & 109 as the Lead CAPCOM for the last Hubble Space Telescope repair mission. He was served as an Earth and planetary scientist and the lead for Spacecraft Window Optics and Utilization for the International Space Station's (ISS's) windows, including the U.S. Laboratory Destiny Module Nadir Science Window, the Window Observational Research Facility (WORF), and the ISS's Cupola windows, all of which he helped design.

=== Spaceflight ===
==== STS-44 ====
On his first flight, Runco served as a Mission Specialist (MS-3) on the crew of STS-44 aboard the Space Shuttle ATLANTIS (OV-104) which launched from the Kennedy Space Center's (KSC's) launch pad 39A on the night of November 24, 1991. The primary mission objective was accomplished with the successful deployment of a Defense Support Program (DSP) satellite. In addition, the crew conducted two Military Man-in-Space Earth Observation experiments (M88-1, on which he was the lead, and Terra Scout), three radiation monitoring experiments, and numerous life sciences experiments in support of long duration space flights. STS-44 was originally scheduled as a 10-day mission; however, the oxygen loading for the mission was not sufficient to last 10 days due to the weight of the primary payload so the crew would need to drastically conserve power to be able to make the oxygen last through the full mission duration. The crew’s power conservation efforts paid off on flight day 6 when it appeared there finally was enough oxygen to last the rest of the mission; however, the mission was cut short as Minimum Duration Flight (MDF) when a second navigational Inertial Measurement Unit (IMU) was powered up for redundancy and immediately failed and (CAPCOM) and fellow classmate Jan Davis dejectedly called the Commander Fred Gregory with the bad news, "“Fred, we’ve run out of ideas on IMU-2. We see problems both with the attitude and the velocity. We have declared IMU-2 failed.” ATLANTIS (OV-104) returned with only 2 of 3 IMU’s (#'s 1 and 3) operating to a contingency landing the next day on lakebed runway 05 at Edwards Air Force Base, California, on December 1, 1991, completing 110 orbits of the Earth.

==== STS-54 ====
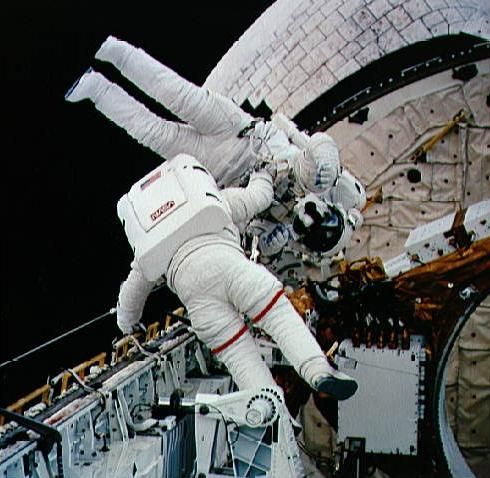
Runco carried by fellow astronaut Gregory Harbaugh during their EVA on the STS-54 mission

Even before launching for his first mission, Runco was assigned as a Mission Specialist (MS1) to his second flight, STS-54, which would fly on the Space Shuttle ENDEAVOUR (OV-105). STS-54 launched from KSC’s launch pad 39B launch pad 39B on January 13, 1993, and landed at the Shuttle Landing Facility (SLF) runway 33 at KSC in Florida on January 19, 1993, completing 96 orbits of the Earth. The six-day mission’s primary objective was accomplished with his deployment of a NASA Tracking and Data Relay Satellite (TDRS-F) on flight day 1. Also carried in the payload bay was the Diffuse X-Ray Spectrometer (DXS). This astronomical instrument for studying stellar evolution scanned the local vicinity of our Milky Way galaxy and recorded the low-energy X-ray emanations believed to originate from the plasma remnants of an ancient supernova. Crewmate Greg Harbaugh (EV1) and Runco (EV2) also became the 47th and 48th Americans to walk in space during a 4.5-hour spacewalk designed to evaluate the limits of human performance during extravehicular activities (EVA) in anticipation of the construction of the ISS. Included in these EVA evaluations was the first and only attempt thus far at ingressing a personal foot restraint (PFR) without the use of handholds, which Runco accomplished successfully and is still the only person to have done so. Of Runco, his spacewalking crew mate commented, “Mario was the most naturally skilled EVA guy I ever saw. He moved with ease and was able to accomplish everything he was challenged to do. He ingressed the Personal Foot Restraint (PFR) without handholds, a task ground controllers were taking bets on as to whether it could be accomplished or not, look like he’d done it his whole life, and even did it a second time when disbelieving ground controllers asked him to do it again, which he did. Early in the EVA, he even caught a small tool case when it came loose after my tether hook failed to close (that’s my story and I’m sticking to it) as we were transferring the tool items we needed to take with us from the payload bay’s EVA tool box or Personnel Support Assembly (PSA) to our portable mini-work stations. Mario had large strong hands, which are a huge asset for EVA, and he was a hockey player so he had tremendous endurance. I find it curious that he never got a chance to display his skills on HST or ISS.” Lastly, in what was called the "Physics of Toys In Space", which has since become a popular children's educational video, the crew also demonstrated how everyday toys behave in space to an interactive audience of elementary school students across the United States. Mission duration was 5 days, 23 hours and 38 minutes.

==== STS-77 ====
On his last mission he served as a Mission Specialist (MS-3) on the crew of STS-77 aboard the Space Shuttle ENDEAVOUR (OV-105). Launching from KSC’s launch pad 39B on May 19, 1996, STS-77 carried a number of technology development experiments as well as a suite of microgravity science experiments. STS-77 also featured the fourth flight of a SpaceHab module, in this case a double module, as an experiment laboratory carried in ENDEAVOUR’s payload bay. The technology development experiments included two deployable satellites both of which were deployed by Runco. For the deploy of the Shuttle Pointed Autonomous Research Tool for Astronomy (SPARTAN)-207/Inflatable Antenna Experiment Runco was the Remote Manipulator System (Robotic Arm) operator. The other deployable was a small Satellite Test Unit (STU) which was designed to use the drag from the rarified atmosphere present in low Earth orbit and the Earth’s magnetic field for attitude control and stabilization. His foresight in having high resolution and low light level photography equipment and a high intensity spotlight added to the mission’s suite of photography equipment and insisting that a second overhead window rather than a blank be installed in the second of the twin SpaceHab modules, salvaged this experiment when its laser Attitude Measuring System (AMS), also installed in the payload bay, failed shortly after deploy of the satellite. He used these assets and his photographic expertise to capture video of the STU as Endeavour tracked and flew astern of it for several days. Principal investigators were able to use the video retrieved by Runco in lieu of the AMS data to complete their evaluations. A clip from this video of the STU have even been posted on the internet as proof of the existence of UFO’s. He also captured some additional "Physics of Toys" scenes for a sequel to the original STS-54 educational video and subsequently made several appearances on the children’s television show Sesame Street (Episodes 3696**, 3698, 3731, 3776, and 3785) in 1998 for the “Slimey to the Moon” series during Season 29 (1997-98). STS-77 landed at KSC’s SLF runway 33 on May 29, 1996, completing 161 orbits of the Earth. Mission duration was 10 days and 39 minutes.

=== Post-spaceflight ===
Upon leaving the astronaut office, Runco became the JSC lead for spacecraft window optics and utilization endeavouring to have optical quality windows installed in the ISS and all future spacecraft. As such, he assisted with the design of the ISS’s U.S. Laboratory Destiny Module Nadir Science Window and Cupola Windows. He also was a key designer of the WORF installed over the Destiny science window and was a co-principal investigator on the University of North Dakota’s ISS Agricultural Camera (ISS AgCam/ISSAC), which operated from the WORF. In addition, he helped with the design and facilitated the integration of several other WORF payloads including EarthKAM, IMAX for the filming of Toni Myers’ last film, “A Beautiful Planet", Nanoracks, ISS SERVIR Environmental Research and Visualization System (I-SERV), and Chiba University’s (Japan) “Meteor” observation study.

== Personal life ==
Runco married the former Susan Kay Friess of Sylvania, Ohio. They have two children. He is also a former New Jersey state trooper and USGS research hydrologist.

== Publications ==
1. Schultz, Christopher J.; Lang, Timothy J.; Leake, Skye; Runco, Mario; Stefanov, William (January 29, 2020). "A Technique for Automated Detection of Lightning in Images and Video From the International Space Station for Scientific Understanding and Validation". Earth and Space Science. 8 (2) e2020EA001085. American Geophysical Union (published February 2021). Bibcode:2021E&SS....801085S. doi:10.1029/2020EA001085.

2. Schultz, Christopher J.; Lang, Timothy J.; Leake, Skye; Runco, Jr., Mario; Blakeslee, Richard J. (December 11, 2017). Utilizing ISS Camera Systems for Scientific Analysis of Lightning Characteristics and comparison with ISS-LIS and GLM (PDF). AGU Fall Meeting. New Orleans, LA: NASA/American Geophysical Union. Bibcode:2017AGUFMAE33A2516S. hdl:2060/20170011711. MSFC-E-DAA-TN50229. Archived (PDF) from the original on February 23, 2025.

3. Runco, Jr., Mario; Scott, Karen P. (October 1, 2011). "NASA Space Flight Human-System Standard - Volume 2: Human Factors, Habitability, and Environmental Health" (PDF) (Baseline ed.). NASA. pp. 11–12, 100, 104–107, 173–194. NASA-STD-3001 Vol 2. Archived (PDF) from the original on May 14, 2025.

4. Runco, Jr., Mario; Scott, Karen P. (January 27, 2010). Human Integration Design Handbook (HIDH) (PDF) (Baseline ed.). NASA. pp. iii, 9–10, 592–624, 969–997, 1066–1127. NASA/SP-2010-3407. Archived from the original (PDF) on May 27, 2010.

5. Runco, Jr., Mario; Scott, Karen P. (January 27, 2010). "Optical Performance Requirements for Windows in Human Space Flight Applications". Human Integration Design Handbook (HIDH) (PDF) (Baseline ed.). NASA. pp. 1089–1127. NASA/SP-2010-3407. Archived from the original (PDF) on May 27, 2010.

6. Runco, Jr., Mario; Scott, Karen P. (January 27, 2010). "Basic Optical Theory Applied to Windows". Human Integration Design Handbook (HIDH) (PDF) (Baseline ed.). NASA. pp. 1089–1127. NASA/SP-2010-3407. Archived from the original (PDF) on May 27, 2010.

7. Runco, Jr., Mario; Scott, Karen P. (January 27, 2010). "Optical Design Guidelines for Good Windows". Human Integration Design Handbook (HIDH) (PDF) (Baseline ed.). NASA. pp. 1089–1127. NASA/SP-2010-3407. Archived from the original (PDF) on May 27, 2010.

8. Runco Jr., Mario and Karen P. Scott. Requirements for Optical Properties for Windows Used in Crewed Spacecraft (JSC-63307), Baseline ed. Houston, Texas 77058-3696: NASA, 6-28-2007. pp. 1-11, A1-A3. 1 vols. NASA - Lyndon B. Johnson Space Center. Web. 10 May 2011. (Approved for Public Release) <NASA-JSC Scientific and Technical Information Center [STIC] Library>

9. Runco, Jr., Mario; Scott, Karen P. (November 19, 2010). Constellation Program Human - System Integration Requirements (PDF) (Technical report). NASA. pp. 95–98, 243–247, Appx. M, Appx. A, Appx. J. hdl:2060/20120014522. CxP 70024/JSC-CN-26834. Archived (PDF) from the original on June 29, 2022.

10. Runco, Mario, Dean B. Eppler, Karen P. Scott2, & Susan K. Runco. Earth Science and Remote Sensing from the International Space Station utilizing the Destiny Laboratory’s Science Window and the Window Observational Research Facility. Proceedings of the 30th International Symposium on Remote Sensing of Environment (ISRSE), Information for Risk Management and Sustainable Development, Pages 737-740; Honolulu, Hawaii; November 10-14, 2003 (Symposium organized by the East-West Center [EWC], Honolulu, Hawaii; the International Society of Photogrammetry and Remote Sensing [ISPRS], Bethesda, Maryland [American Chapter]; and the International Center for Remote Sensing of Environment, Tucson, Arizona) [ISBN 0-932913-10-5].

11. Scott, Karen P., Leonard W. Brownlow, & Mario Runco. International Space Station Cupola Scratch Pane Window Optical Test Results (The Aerospace Corp. Assessment JA3138, Publication #: ATR-2003(7828)-1), Houston, TX 77058: NASA-JSC Contract No. NAS9-00090, Flight System Safety and Mission Assurance Division, NASA - Lyndon B. Johnson Space Center 77058-3696, January 17, 2003. (Approved for Public Release) < NASA-JSC Scientific and Technical Information Center Library>

12. Vaupel, Donald E.; Prince, K. R.; Koehler, A. J.; Runco, Mario (1977). Potentiometric surfaces of the upper glacial and Magothy aquifers and selected streamflow statistics, 1943-72, on Long Island, New York (PDF) (Technical report). United States Geological Survey. doi:10.3133/ofr77528. 77-528. Archived (PDF) from the original on July 25, 2025.
