= Donald R. McMonagle =

American astronaut (born 1952)

Donald McMonagle
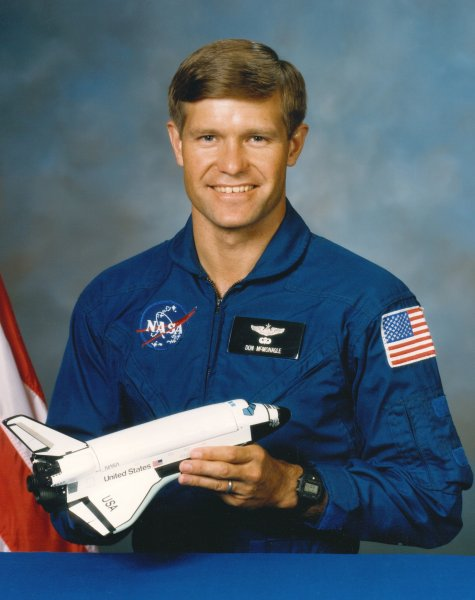
- Born: Donald Ray McMonagle; May 14, 1952 (age 74); Flint, Michigan, U.S.
- Education: United States Air Force Academy (BS); California State University, Fresno (MS); University of Michigan (MBA)
- Awards: Distinguished Flying Cross
- Space career

NASA astronaut
- Rank: Colonel, USAF
- Time in space: 25d 5h 34m
- Selection: NASA Group 12 (1987)
- Mission: STS-39; STS-54; STS-66

Donald Ray McMonagle (born May 14, 1952) (Col, USAF, Ret.) is a former astronaut and a veteran of three shuttle flights. He became the Manager, Launch Integration, at the Kennedy Space Center, Florida, on August 15, 1997. In this capacity he was responsible for final shuttle preparation, launch execution, and return of the orbiter to KSC following landings at any other location. He was chair of the Mission Management Team, and was the final authority for launch decision.

== Early years ==
McMonagle was born on May 14, 1952, in Flint, Michigan, and graduated from Hamady High School in 1970. He received a Bachelor of Science degree in astronautical engineering from the United States Air Force Academy in 1974, a Master of Science degree in mechanical engineering from California State University, Fresno in 1985, and a Master of Business Administration degree from the University of Michigan Ross School of Business in 2003.

== Military career ==
McMonagle completed pilot training at Columbus Air Force Base (AFB), Mississippi, in 1975. After F-4 training at Homestead AFB, Florida, he went on a one-year tour of duty as an F-4 pilot at Kunsan Air Base, South Korea. He returned from overseas to Holloman AFB, New Mexico, in 1977. In 1979, McMonagle was assigned to Luke AFB, Arizona, as an F-15 instructor pilot. In 1981, he entered the USAF Test Pilot School at Edwards AFB, California, and was the outstanding graduate in his class. From 1982 to 1985, McMonagle was the operations officer and a project test pilot for the Advanced Fighter Technology Integration F-16 aircraft. After attending the Air Command and Staff College at Maxwell AFB, Alabama, from 1985 to 1986, he was assigned as the operations officer of the 6513th Test Squadron at Edwards AFB.

McMonagle has over 5,000 hours of flying experience in a variety of aircraft, primarily the T-38, F-4, F-15, and F-16.

== Astronaut ==
McMonagle was selected as an astronaut by NASA in June 1987. A veteran of three space flights, he has logged over 605 hours in space.

McMonagle flew as a mission specialist aboard the Space Shuttle Discovery on Department of Defense mission STS-39 in April 1991. During this eight-day mission, the seven-man crew deployed, operated, and retrieved a remotely controlled spacecraft and conducted several science experiments to include research of both natural and induced phenomena in the Earth's atmosphere.

In January 1993, McMonagle served as pilot on STS-54 aboard the Space Shuttle Endeavour. The six-day mission featured the deployment of a tracking and data relay satellite (TDRS), and the collection of information about celestial x-rays using a diffuse X-ray spectrometer.

McMonagle commanded a crew of six aboard Space Shuttle Atlantis on the STS-66 Atmospheric Laboratory for Applications and Science-3 (ATLAS-3) 11-day mission in November 1994.

In January 1996, McMonagle was assigned the task to establish a new Extra-Vehicular Activity (EVA) Project Office responsible for managing all NASA resources associated with space suits and tools used to conduct spacewalks in support of space shuttles and the International Space Station. This role included responsibility for developing and implementing a plan for research and development of next-generation space suits to support future human space exploration.

== Organizations ==
McMonagle is a member of the Society of Experimental Test Pilots; Association of Graduates, U.S. Air Force Academy; and Association of Space Explorers.

== Special honors ==
McMonagle's accomplishments have earned him many notable awards, including:

- Air Medal
- Meritorious Service Medal
- Three Air Force Commendation Medals
- Defense Meritorious Service Medal
- Distinguished Flying Cross
- Liethen-Tittle Award (Top Graduate from USAF Test Pilot School)
- Three NASA Space Flight Medals
- NASA Exceptional Service Medal
- NASA Outstanding Leadership Medal

== Personal life ==
McMonagle is currently single, retired and living in Colorado />

As of 19 June 2006, he was named as the Vice-President of Quality and Mission Effectiveness of the Missile Systems business unit of Raytheon in Tucson.
