= STS-54 =

1993 American crewed spaceflight to deploy TRDS-6

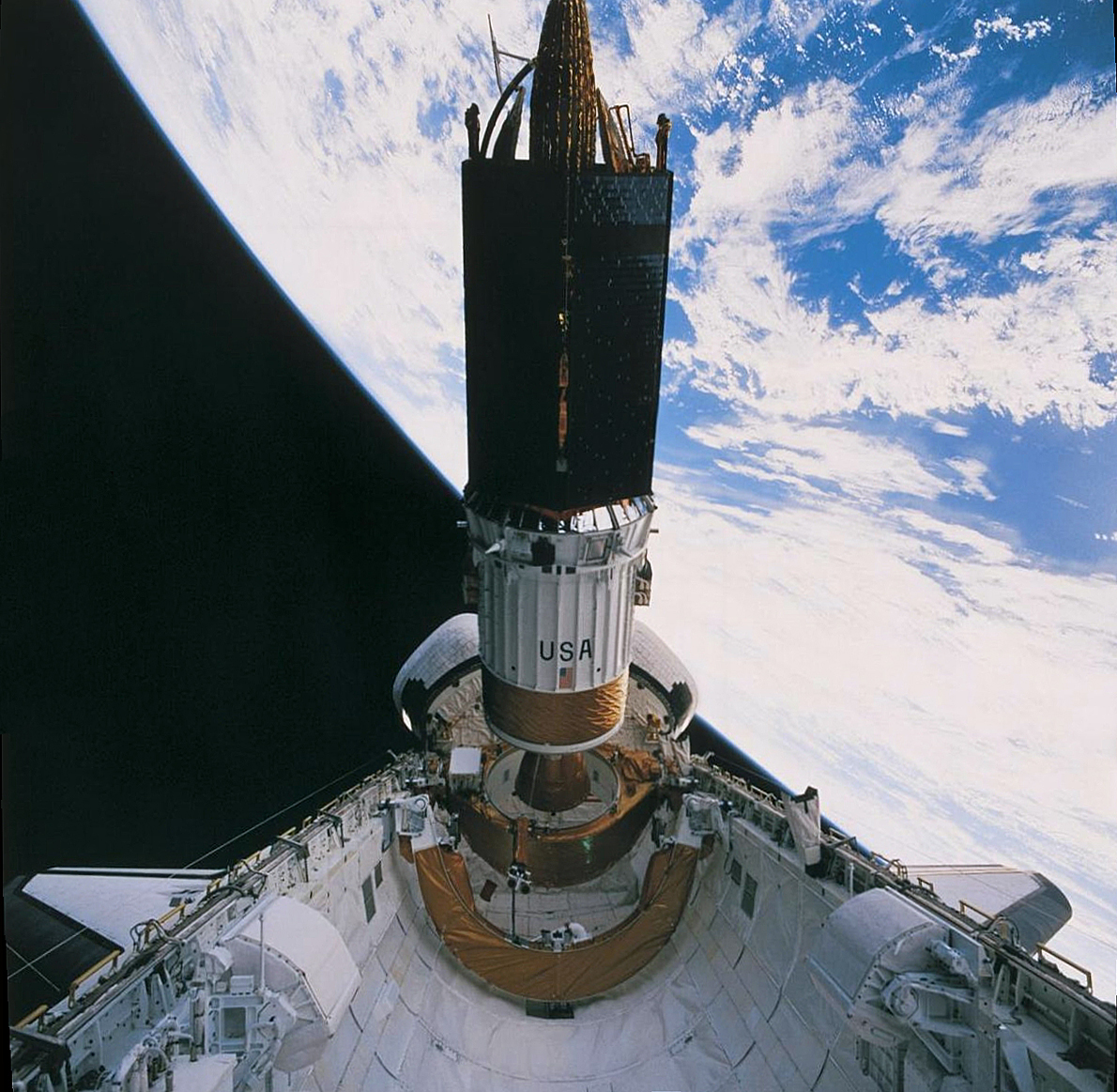
- Endeavour deploys the TDRS-F satellite.
- Names: Space Transportation System-54
- Mission type: TDRS-F satellite deployment Technology research
- Operator: NASA
- COSPAR ID: 1993-003A
- SATCAT no.: 22313
- Mission duration: 5 days, 23 hours, 38 minutes, 17 seconds
- Distance travelled: 4,025,415 km (2,501,277 mi)
- Orbits completed: 96

Spacecraft properties
- Spacecraft: Space Shuttle Endeavour
- Landing mass: 92,988 kg (205,003 lb)
- Payload mass: 18,559 kg (40,916 lb)

Crew
- Crew size: 5
- Members: John Casper; Donald R. McMonagle; Mario Runco Jr.; Gregory J. Harbaugh; Susan Helms
- EVAs: 1
- EVA duration: 4h, 28m

Start of mission
- Launch date: January 13, 1993, 13:59:30 UTC (8:59:30 am EST)
- Launch site: Kennedy, LC-39B
- Contractor: Rockwell International

End of mission
- Landing date: January 19, 1993, 13:37:47 UTC (8:37:47 am EST)
- Landing site: Kennedy, SLF Runway 33

Orbital parameters
- Reference system: Geocentric orbit
- Regime: Low Earth orbit
- Perigee altitude: 302 km (188 mi)
- Apogee altitude: 309 km (192 mi)
- Inclination: 28.45 degrees
- Period: 90.60 minutes

Instruments
- Commercial General Bioprocessing Apparatus (CGPA); Chromosome and Plant Cell Division; Diffuse X-ray Spectrometer (DXS); Physiological and Anatomical Rodent Experiment (PARE); Space Acceleration Measurement Equipment (SAMS); Solid Surface Combustion Experiment (SSCE)
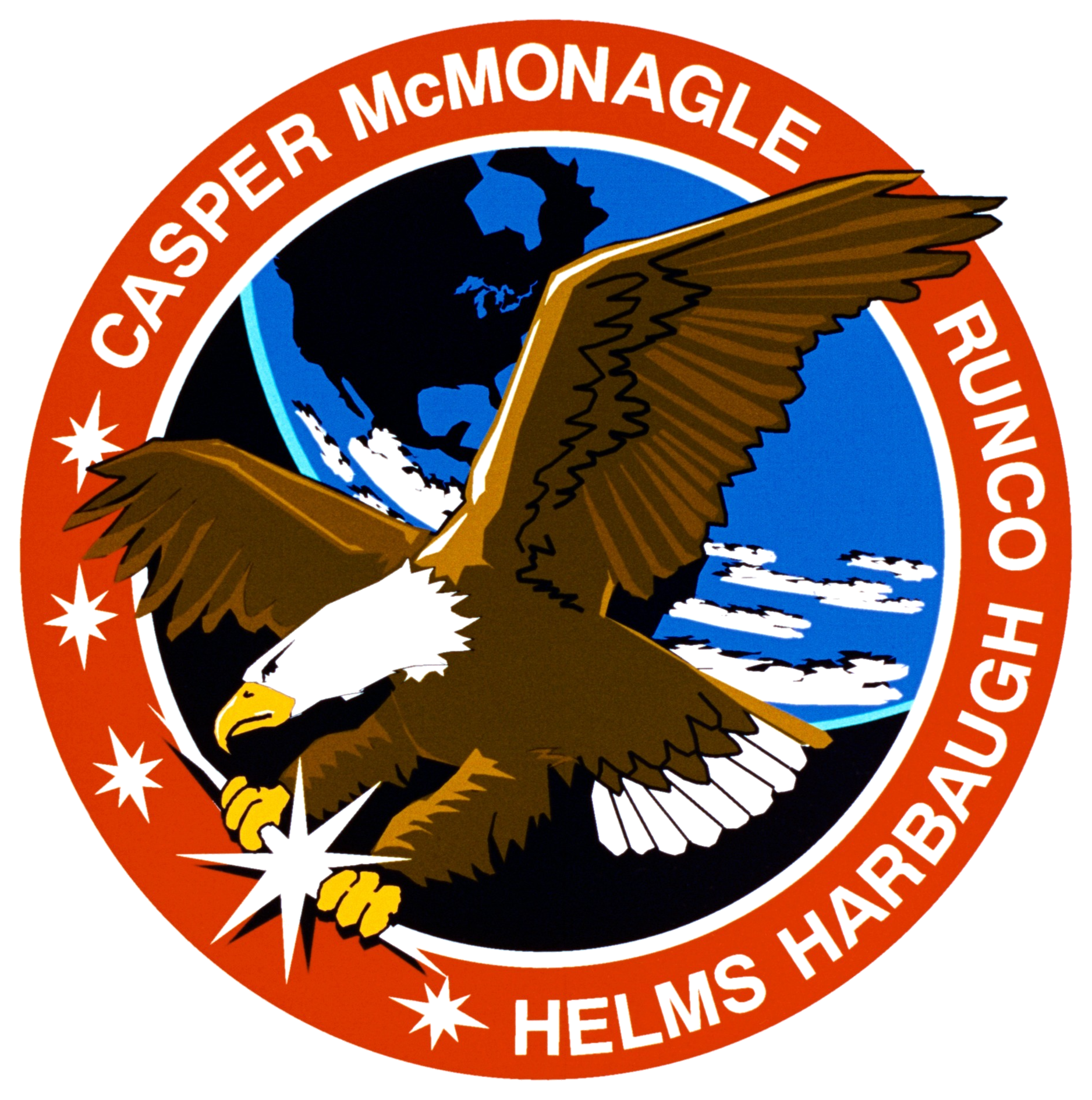
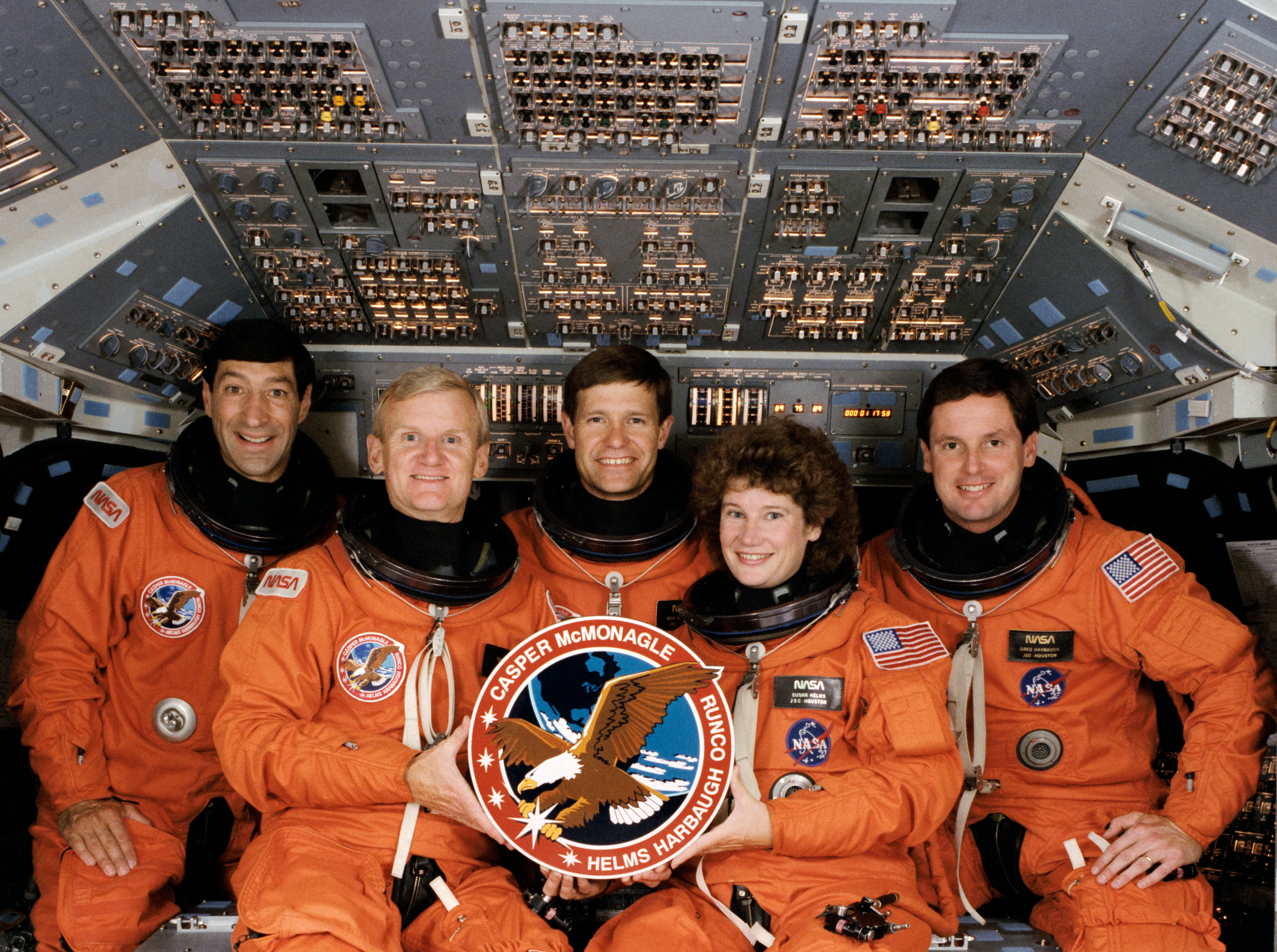
- STS-54 mission patch From left: Runco, Casper, McMonagle, Helms and Harbaugh Space Shuttle program

STS-54 was a NASA Space Transportation System (Space Shuttle) mission using Space Shuttle Endeavour. This was the third flight for Endeavour, and was launched on January 13, 1993, with Endeavour returning to the Kennedy Space Center on January 19, 1993.

== Crew ==
Position	Astronaut
Commander	John Casper; Second spaceflight
Pilot	Donald R. McMonagle; Second spaceflight
Mission Specialist 1	Mario Runco Jr. Second spaceflight
Mission Specialist 2 Flight Engineer	Gregory J. Harbaugh; Second spaceflight
Mission Specialist 3	Susan Helms; First spaceflight

=== Crew seat assignments ===
Seat	Launch	Landing	Seats 1–4 are on the flight deck. Seats 5–7 are on the mid-deck.
1	Casper		Seats 1–4 are on the flight deck. Seats 5–7 are on the mid-deck.
2	McMonagle		Seats 1–4 are on the flight deck. Seats 5–7 are on the mid-deck.
3	Runco	Helms	Seats 1–4 are on the flight deck. Seats 5–7 are on the mid-deck.
4	Harbaugh		Seats 1–4 are on the flight deck. Seats 5–7 are on the mid-deck.
5	Helms	Runco	Seats 1–4 are on the flight deck. Seats 5–7 are on the mid-deck.
6	Unused		Seats 1–4 are on the flight deck. Seats 5–7 are on the mid-deck.
7	Unused		Seats 1–4 are on the flight deck. Seats 5–7 are on the mid-deck.

== Mission highlights ==
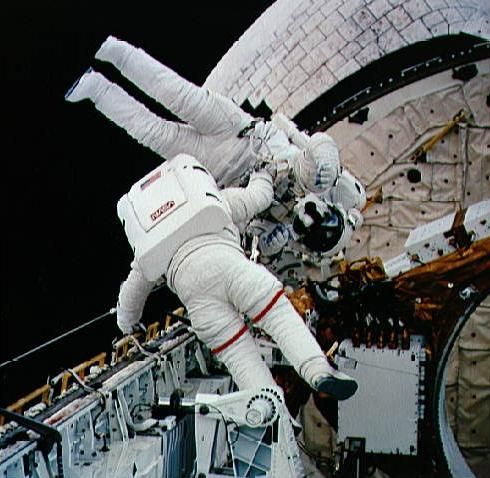
Harbaugh and Runco during the EVA

The primary payload was the fifth TDRS satellite, TDRS-F, which was deployed on day one of the mission. It was later successfully transferred to its proper orbit by the Inertial Upper Stage (IUS). Also carried into orbit in the payload bay was a Hitchhiker experiment called the Diffuse X-ray Spectrometer (DXS). This instrument collected data on X-ray radiation from diffuse sources in deep space.

Other middeck payloads to test the effects of microgravity included the Commercial General Bioprocessing Apparatus (CGPA) for-life sciences research; the Chromosome and Plant Cell Division in Space Experiment (CHROMEX) to-study plant growth; the Physiological and Anatomical Rodent Experiment (PARE) to examine the skeletal system and the adaptation of bone to space flight; the Space Acceleration Measurement Equipment (SAMS) to measure and record the microgravity acceleration environment of middeck experiments; and the Solid Surface Combustion Experiment (SSCE) to measure the rate of flame spread and temperature of burning filter paper.

Also, on day five, mission specialists Mario Runco Jr. and Gregory J. Harbaugh spent nearly 5 hours in the open cargo bay performing a series of space-walking tasks designed to increase NASA's knowledge of working in space. They tested their abilities to move about freely in the cargo bay, climb into foot restraints without using their hands and simulated carrying large objects in the microgravity environment. The EVA completed after 4 hours, 28 minutes.

The EVA was a late addition to the mission plan as part of NASA's objectives to hone EVA skills required for hardware assembly anticipating the International Space Station.

The mission completed on January 19, 1993, with a landing at Kennedy Space Center.

== See also ==
- List of human spaceflights
- List of Space Shuttle missions
- Outline of space science
- Space Shuttle
