= STS-61-G =

Canceled Space Shuttle mission

- Names: Space Transportation System
- Mission type: Galileo spacecraft deployment
- Operator: NASA
- Mission duration: 4 days, 1 hour, 11 minutes (planned)

Spacecraft properties
- Spacecraft: Space Shuttle Atlantis (planned)
- Launch mass: 116,831 kg (257,568 lb)
- Landing mass: 88,881 kg (195,949 lb)
- Payload mass: 22,064 kg (48,643 lb)

Crew
- Crew size: 4 (planned)
- Members: David M. Walker; Ronald J. Grabe; Norman E. Thagard; James D. A. "OX" van Hoften

Start of mission
- Launch date: 20 May 1986, 20:21:00 UTC (planned) - Never launched
- Rocket: Space Shuttle Atlantis
- Launch site: Kennedy Space Center, LC-39A
- Contractor: Rockwell International

End of mission
- Landing date: 24 May 1986, 21:32:00 UTC (planned)
- Landing site: Kennedy Space Center

Orbital parameters
- Reference system: Geocentric orbit (planned)
- Regime: Low Earth orbit
- Perigee altitude: 298 km (185 mi)
- Apogee altitude: 307 km (191 mi)
- Inclination: 34.30°
- Period: 90.60 minutes
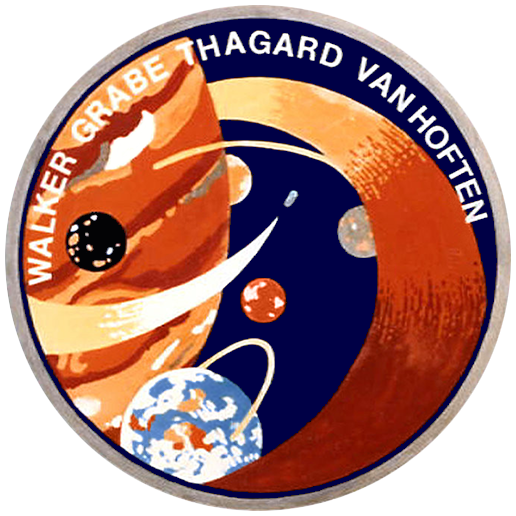
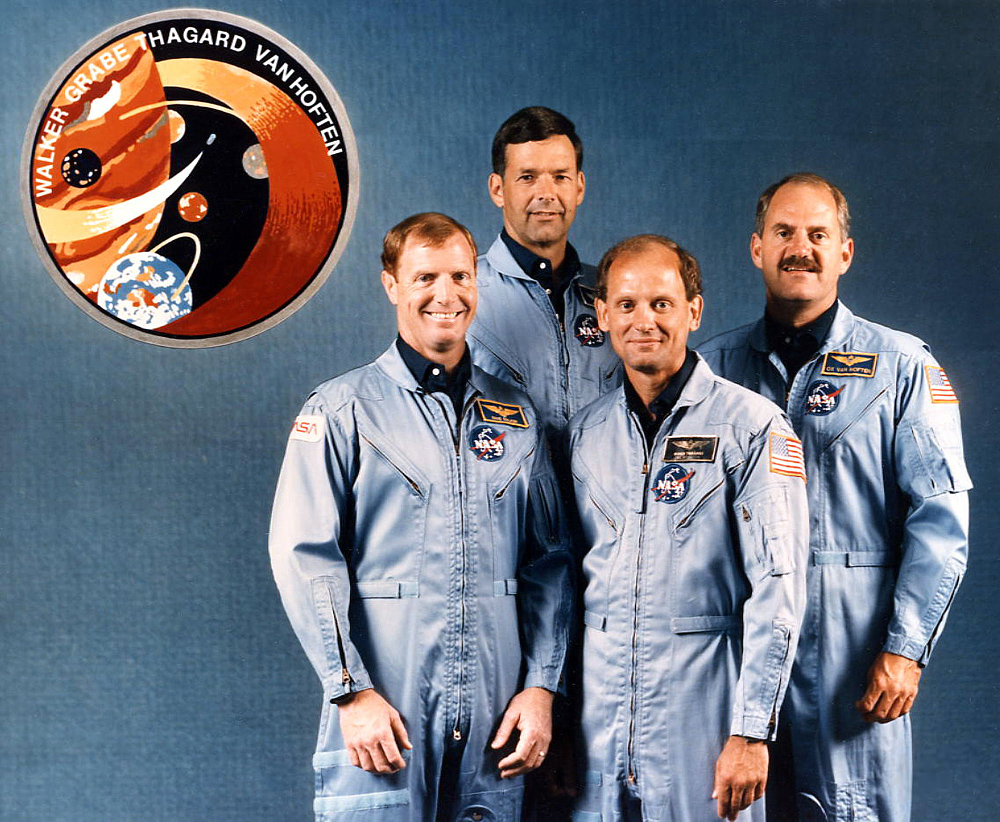
- STS-61-G mission patch David M. Walker, Ronald J. Grabe, Norman E. Thagard, James D. A. "OX" van Hoften Space Shuttle program Cancelled Shuttle missions

STS-61-G was a NASA Space Shuttle mission planned to launch on 20 May 1986, using Atlantis. The main objective of this mission was to launch the Galileo spacecraft toward Jupiter using the Centaur-G upper stage. It was canceled after the Space Shuttle Challenger disaster.

== Crew ==
Position	Astronaut
Commander	David M. Walker; Would have been second space mission
Pilot	Ronald J. Grabe; Would have been second space mission
Mission Specialist 1	Norman E. Thagard; Would have been third space mission
Mission Specialist 2	James D. A. "OX" van Hoften; Would have been third space mission

=== Crew notes ===
John M. Fabian was scheduled to fly as Mission Specialist 1 on his third trip to space, but he took advice from his wife who had earlier told him that "his marriage had a two-flight limit", he soon resigned from this mission. His replacement was Norman E. Thagard. Most of the crew sans van Hoften flew on STS-30 in May 1989, with Mary L. Cleave taking the place of van Hoften and the addition of rookie Mark C. Lee. Galileo was launched on STS-34 in October 1989, using the Inertial Upper Stage (IUS) booster instead of the Centaur-G (which was canceled in 1986).

== See also ==
- Canceled Space Shuttle missions
- STS-30
- STS-34
