= NBP =

NBP can stand for:

== Acronyms ==
- Namco Bandai Partners
- Name Binding Protocol
- Nathaniel B. Palmer (icebreaker)
- National Balancing Point (UK)
- NBP F.C. (National Bank of Pakistan football club)
- National Bank of Pakistan
- Narodowy Bank Polski (National Bank of Poland)
- National Battlefield Park, a protected area in the United States
- National Bolshevik Party
- National broadband plan
- Neutral body posture
- Network Bootstrap Program
- New Bilibid Prison
- New Black Panthers
- New Blue Party of Ontario
- NicerBooks! Publishing, an imprint of VDM Publishing
- Nobilis Patricius Bruxellensis: a descendant of the Seven noble houses of Brussels with a title of nobility.
- Nonparametric belief propagation
- Northern Black Polished Ware
- Normal blood pressure
- Normal boiling point
- NVIDIA Business Platform

== Other ==
- Nnam language (ISO 639 language code nbp)
- Nibhapur railway station (train station code NBP); see List of railway stations in India
- .NBP, a file extension of Mathematica
