= Nancy J. Currie-Gregg =

American astronaut, engineer and Army officer (born 1958)

Nancy Currie
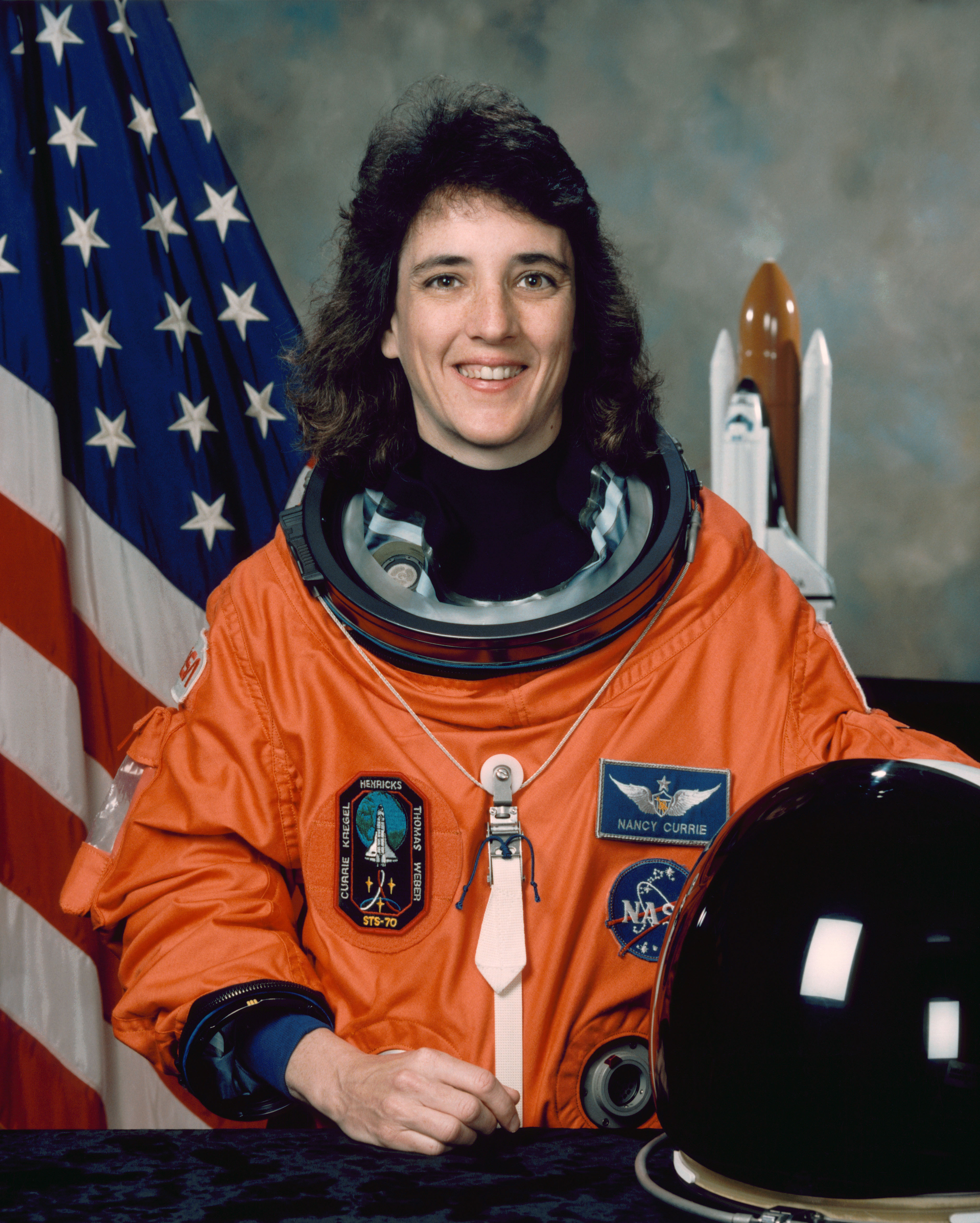
- Born: Nancy Jane Decker; December 29, 1958 (age 67); Wilmington, Delaware, U.S.
- Education: Ohio State University (BS); University of Southern California (MS); University of Houston (PhD)
- Space career

NASA astronaut
- Rank: Colonel, USA
- Time in space: 41d 15h 32m
- Selection: NASA Group 13 (1990)
- Missions: STS-57; STS-70; STS-88; STS-109
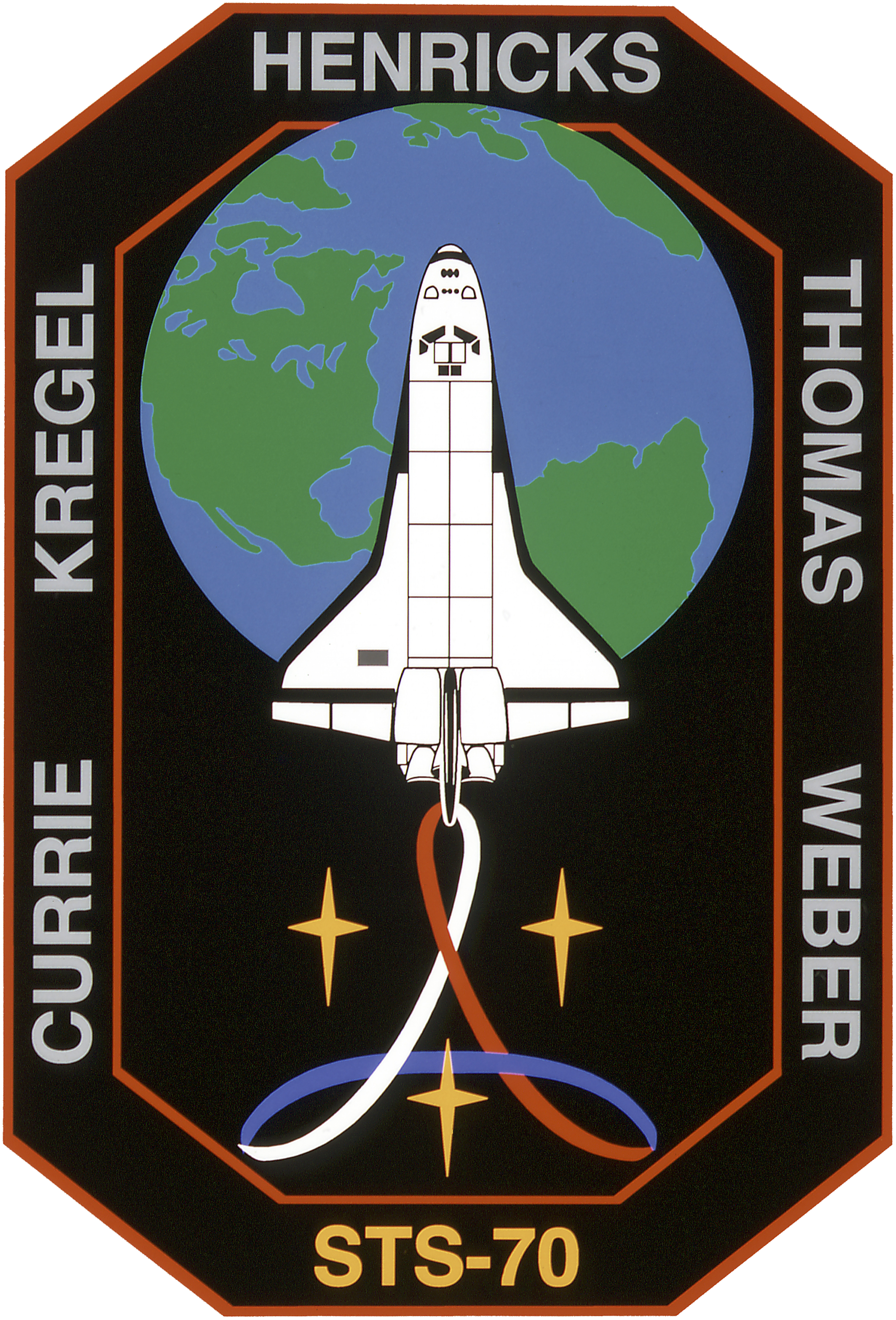
- Mission insignia

Nancy Jane Currie-Gregg (née Decker; former married names Sherlock and Currie; born December 29, 1958) is an American engineer, United States Army officer and a NASA astronaut. Currie-Gregg has served in the United States Army for over 22 years and holds the rank of colonel. With NASA, she has participated in four space shuttle missions: STS-57, STS-70, STS-88, and STS-109, accruing 1,000 hours in space. She currently holds an appointment as a professor of practice in the Department of Industrial & Systems Engineering at Texas A&M University.

== Background ==
Currie-Gregg was born Nancy Jane Decker in Wilmington, Delaware, on December 29, 1958. Her family moved to Troy, Ohio when she was young, and she considers Troy to be her hometown. She graduated from Troy High School in 1977 and then received a Bachelor of Arts degree, with honors, in biological science from Ohio State University in 1980, a Master of Science degree in safety engineering from the University of Southern California in 1985, and a Doctor of Philosophy in industrial engineering from the University of Houston in 1997.

Currie-Gregg is a member of the Army Aviation Association of America, Ohio State University and ROTC Alumni Associations, Institute of Industrial and Systems Engineers, and Human Factors and Ergonomics Society, Association of Space Explorers. She is an associate fellow of the American Institute of Aeronautics and Astronautics.

== Military career ==
Currie-Gregg has served in the United States Army for over 23 years. Prior to her assignment at NASA in 1987, she attended initial rotary-wing pilot training and was subsequently assigned as an instructor pilot at the U.S. Army Aviation School. She has served in a variety of leadership positions including section leader, platoon leader, and brigade flight-standardization officer. As a Master Army Aviator she has logged over 3,900 flying hours in a variety of rotary-wing and fixed-wing aircraft.

== Astronaut career ==
Currie-Gregg was assigned to NASA Johnson Space Center in September 1987 as a flight simulation engineer on the Shuttle Training Aircraft, a complex airborne simulator which models flight characteristics of the Shuttle orbiter. An astronaut since 1990, she has been involved in robotic hardware and procedure development for the shuttle and space station and has worked as a spacecraft communicator. Dr. Currie-Gregg has also served as the chief of the Astronaut Office Robotics and Payloads-Habitability branches and the Habitability and Human Factors Office in JSC's Space and Life Sciences Directorate. She has assisted the Johnson Space Center's Automation, Robotics, and Simulation Division in the development of advanced robotics systems and is a consultant to NASA's Space Human Factors Engineering Project. A veteran of four Space Shuttle missions, she has accrued 1,000 hours in space. She flew as mission specialist – flight engineer, on STS-57 (1993), STS-70 (1995), STS-88 (1998; the first International Space Station assembly mission), and STS-109 (2002).

=== STS-57 ===
STS-57 Endeavour (June 21 to July 1, 1993). The primary objective of this mission was the retrieval of the European Retrievable Carrier satellite (EURECA). Additionally, this mission featured the first flight of Spacehab, a commercially provided middeck augmentation module for the conduct of microgravity experiments, as well as a spacewalk by two crewmembers, during which Dr. Currie-Gregg operated the Shuttle's robotic arm. Spacehab carried 22 individual flight experiments in materials and life sciences research. STS-57 orbited the Earth 155 times and covered over 4.1 million miles in over 239 hours and 45 minutes.

=== STS-70 ===
STS-70 Discovery (July 13–22, 1995). The five-member crew deployed the final NASA Tracking and Data Relay Satellite to complete the constellation of NASA's orbiting communication satellite system. Dr. Currie-Gregg also conducted a myriad of biomedical and remote sensing experiments. STS-70 orbited the Earth 143 times and covered over 3.7 million miles in over 214 hours and 20 minutes.

=== STS-88 ===
STS-88 Endeavour (December 4–15, 1998). STS-88, ISS Flight 2A was the first International Space Station assembly mission. The primary objective of this 12-day mission was to mate the first American-made module, Unity, to the first Russian-made module, Zarya. Dr. Currie-Gregg's primary role was to operate the Shuttle's 50-foot robotic arm to retrieve Zarya and connect the first two station segments. Two crewmembers performed a series of three spacewalks to connect electrical umbilicals and to attach hardware to the exterior structure for use during future EVAs. Dr. Currie-Gregg also operated the robot arm during the spacewalks. During the mission, the STS-88 crew ingressed the International Space Station to complete systems activation and installation of communication's equipment. The crew also deployed two small satellites. STS-88 completed 185 orbits of the Earth and covered over 4.7 million miles in 283 hours and 18 minutes.

=== STS-109 ===
STS-109 Columbia (March 1–12, 2002). STS-109 was the fourth mission to service the Hubble Space Telescope. During the flight, Dr. Currie-Gregg's primary role was to operate the Shuttle's 50-foot robot arm to retrieve and redeploy the telescope following the completion of numerous upgrades and repairs. She also operated the robot arm during a series of five consecutive spacewalks performed by four crewmembers. Hubble's scientific capabilities and power system were significantly upgraded with the replacement of both solar arrays and the primary power control unit, the installation of the Advanced Camera for Surveys, and a scientific instrument cooling system. The Hubble Space Telescope was then boosted to a higher orbit and redeployed to continue its mission of providing views of the universe which are unmatched by ground-based telescopes or other satellites. STS-109 completed 165 earth orbits and covered over 3.9 million miles in over 262 hours.

== Later life ==
In September 2003, after the Space Shuttle Columbia disaster, Currie-Gregg was selected to lead the Space Shuttle Program's Safety and Mission Assurance Office. She also served as the Senior Technical Advisor to the Automation, Robotics, and Simulation Division in the Johnson Space Center Engineering Directorate, NESC Chief Engineer at Johnson Space Center, and Principal Engineer in the NASA Engineering and Safety Center.

Currie-Gregg previously held an appointment as adjunct associate professor in North Carolina State University's Department of Industrial Engineering. She is currently a professor of practice in the Department of Industrial & Systems Engineering at Texas A&M University.

Currie-Gregg developed a finite element human vibration model for use in spacecraft coupled loads analysis.

At the 2022 Institute of Industrial and Systems Engineers (IISE) Applied Ergonomics Conference in Orlando, Currie-Gregg served as keynote speaker, discussing her career with both space travel and ergonomics. This was further detailed in the March 2023 ISE Magazine, IISE's monthly publication.

== Personal life ==
Currie-Gregg has been married three times and has a child from her first marriage and one granddaughter. Her second husband, retired Army aviator and United Space Alliance employee CW5 David Currie, died in 2011 from renal cancer.

== Awards and honors ==
- Arts and Sciences Award for Scholarship, Ohio State University (1980)
- Distinguished Graduate of the Army Air Defense Artillery Officer Basic Course (1981)
- Honor Graduate of the Army Rotary Wing Aviator Course (1982)
- Honor Graduate of the Army Aviation Officer Advanced Course (1986)
- Defense Superior Service Medals (2)
- Legion of Merit
- Defense Meritorious Service Medal
- National Defense Service Medal
- Army Service Ribbon
- NASA Outstanding Leadership Medal (2005)
- NASA Exceptional Service Medal (1998, 2012)
- NASA Flight Simulation Engineering Award (1988)
- NASA Space Flight Medals (4)
- Silver Snoopy award
- Ohio Veteran's Hall of Fame (1994)
- Troy, Ohio Hall of Fame (1996)
- Ohio State University Army ROTC Hall of Fame (1996)
- Silver Order of St. Michael, Army Aviation Award (1997).
- Presidential Rank Award, Meritorious Senior Professional (2015)
