= STS-30 =

1989 American crewed spaceflight to deploy Magellan

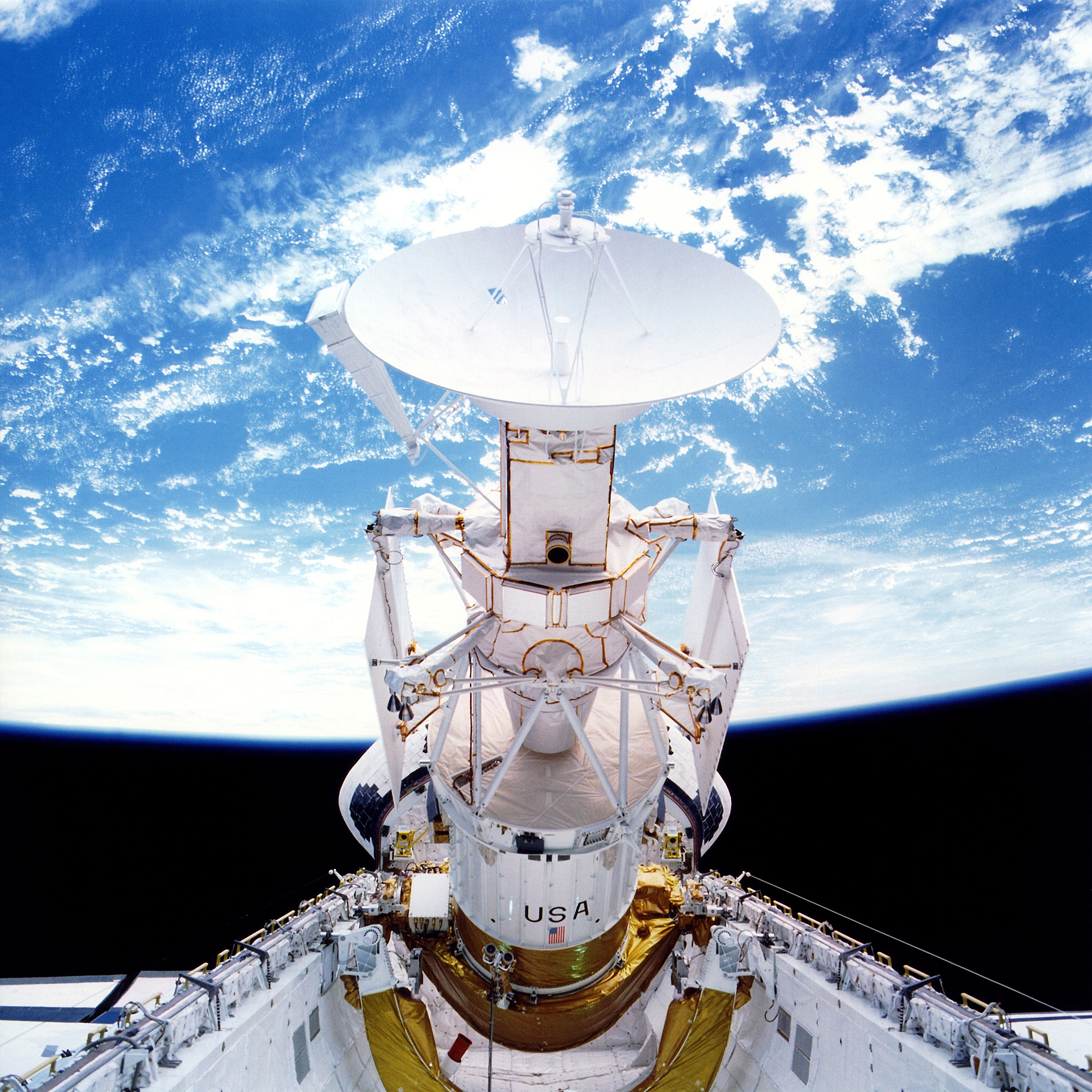
- Magellan and its IUS in the payload bay of Atlantis
- Names: Space Transportation System-30; STS-30R
- Mission type: Magellan spacecraft deployment
- Operator: NASA
- COSPAR ID: 1989-033A
- SATCAT no.: 19968
- Mission duration: 4 days, 56 minutes, 27 seconds
- Distance travelled: 2,377,800 km (1,477,500 mi)
- Orbits completed: 65

Spacecraft properties
- Spacecraft: Space Shuttle Atlantis
- Launch mass: 118,441 kg (261,118 lb)
- Landing mass: 87,296 kg (192,455 lb)
- Payload mass: 20,833 kg (45,929 lb)

Crew
- Crew size: 5
- Members: David M. Walker; Ronald J. Grabe; Mark C. Lee; Norman Thagard; Mary L. Cleave

Start of mission
- Launch date: May 4, 1989, 18:46:59 UTC (2:46:59 pm EDT)
- Launch site: Kennedy, LC-39B
- Contractor: Rockwell International

End of mission
- Landing date: May 8, 1989, 19:43:26 UTC (12:43:26 pm PDT)
- Landing site: Edwards, Runway 22

Orbital parameters
- Reference system: Geocentric orbit
- Regime: Low Earth orbit
- Perigee altitude: 361 km (224 mi)
- Apogee altitude: 366 km (227 mi)
- Inclination: 28.45°
- Period: 91.80 minutes

Instruments
- Fluids Experiment Apparatus (FEA); Mesoscale Lightning Experiment (MLE)
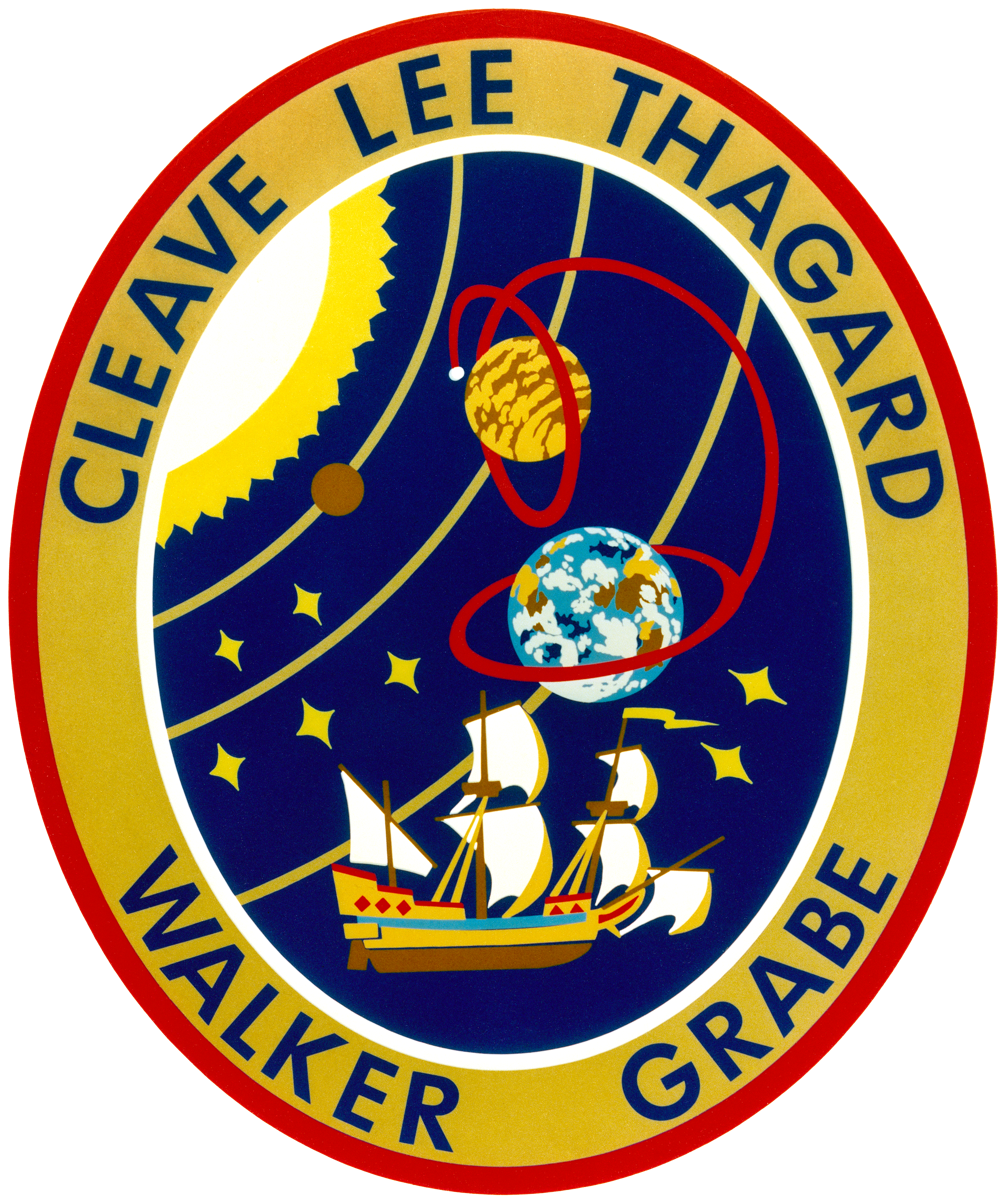
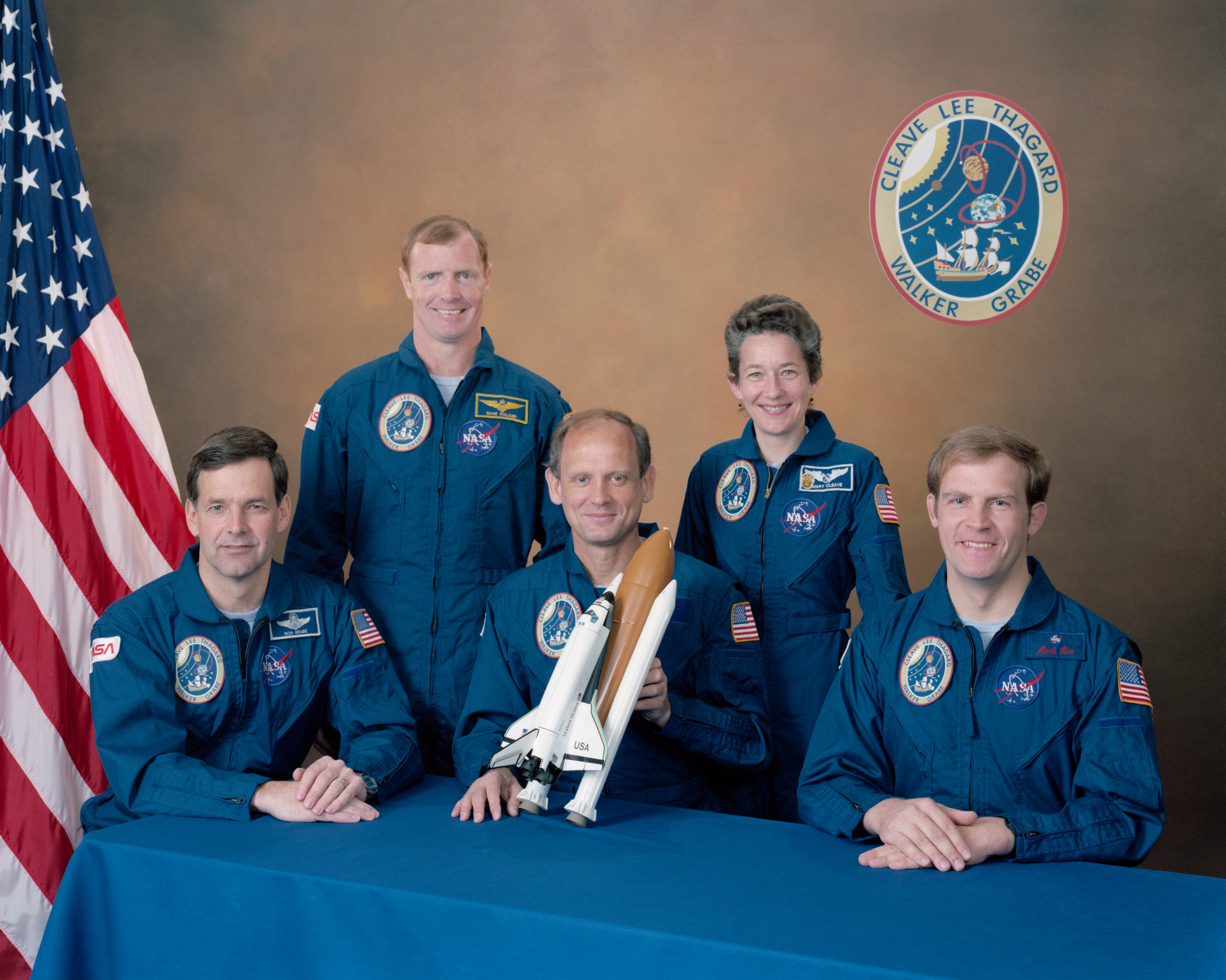
- STS-30 mission patch From left: Grabe, Walker, Thagard, Cleave and Lee Space Shuttle program

STS-30 was the 29th NASA Space Shuttle mission and the fourth mission for Space Shuttle Atlantis. It was the fourth shuttle launch since the Challenger disaster and the first shuttle mission since the disaster to have a female astronaut on board. The mission launched from Kennedy Space Center, Florida, on May 4, 1989, and landed four days later on May 8, 1989. During the mission, Atlantis deployed the Venus-bound Magellan probe into orbit.

The mission was officially designated STS-30R as the original STS-30 designator belonged to STS-61-A, the 22nd Space Shuttle mission. Official documentation for that mission contained the designator STS-30 throughout. As STS-51-L was designated STS-33, future flights with the STS-26 through STS-33 designators would require the R in their documentation to avoid conflicts in tracking data from one mission to another.

== Crew ==
Position	Astronaut
Commander	David M. Walker; Second spaceflight
Pilot	Ronald J. Grabe; Second spaceflight
Mission Specialist 1	Mark C. Lee; First spaceflight
Mission Specialist 2 Flight Engineer	Norman Thagard; Third spaceflight
Mission Specialist 3	Mary L. Cleave; Second and last spaceflight

The crew roster for STS-30 was originally assigned for the crew STS-61-G, which would have launched the Galileo in 1986. Galileo was eventually launched on STS-34 in October 1989. Most of this crew were all assigned to that flight, with James van Hoften as the second mission specialist. Van Hoften never flew again after the Challenger disaster, but chose to retire from NASA in summer 1986, he was replaced by veteran Mary L. Cleave.

=== Crew seat assignments ===
Seat	Launch	Landing	Seats 1–4 are on the flight deck. Seats 5–7 are on the mid-deck.
1	Walker		Seats 1–4 are on the flight deck. Seats 5–7 are on the mid-deck.
2	Grabe		Seats 1–4 are on the flight deck. Seats 5–7 are on the mid-deck.
3	Lee	Cleave	Seats 1–4 are on the flight deck. Seats 5–7 are on the mid-deck.
4	Thagard		Seats 1–4 are on the flight deck. Seats 5–7 are on the mid-deck.
5	Cleave	Lee	Seats 1–4 are on the flight deck. Seats 5–7 are on the mid-deck.
6	Unused		Seats 1–4 are on the flight deck. Seats 5–7 are on the mid-deck.
7	Unused		Seats 1–4 are on the flight deck. Seats 5–7 are on the mid-deck.

== Shuttle processing ==
Atlantis spent three months in the Orbiter Processing Facility (OPF-2) after returning to the Kennedy Space Center at the end of STS-27. During this period technicians got to work removing and replacing all of the damaged Thermal Protection System (TPS) tiles that Atlantis sustained during her prior flight. They also took detailed inspections of the shuttle while simultaneously preparing Atlantis for STS-30R. The shuttle was rolled over to the Vehicle Assembly Building and mated with ET-29 and an SRB set on March 11, 1989. Eleven days later on March 22, 1989, Atlantis was rolled out to launch pad 39B.

== Mission summary ==
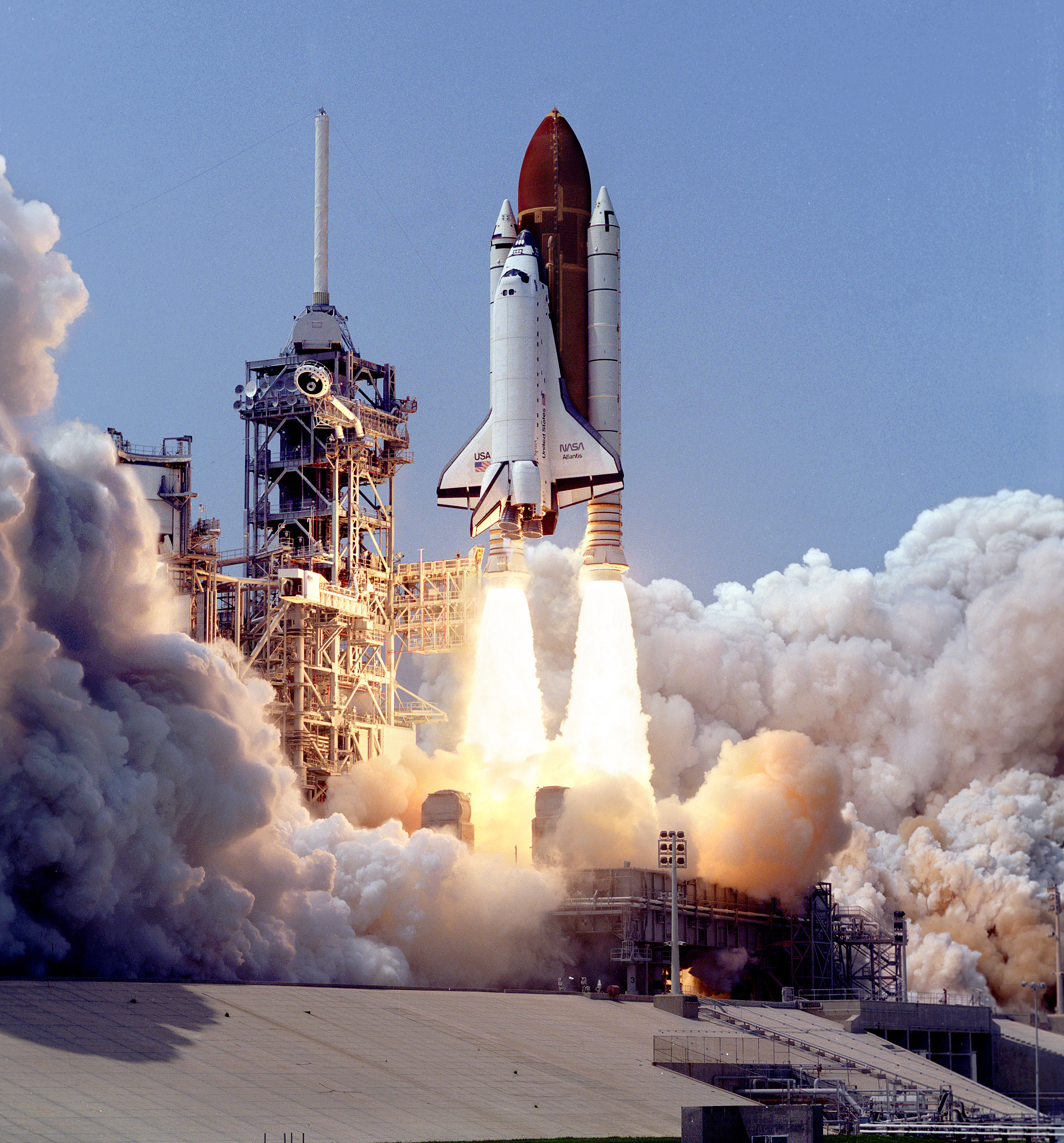
The launch of Atlantis on STS-30

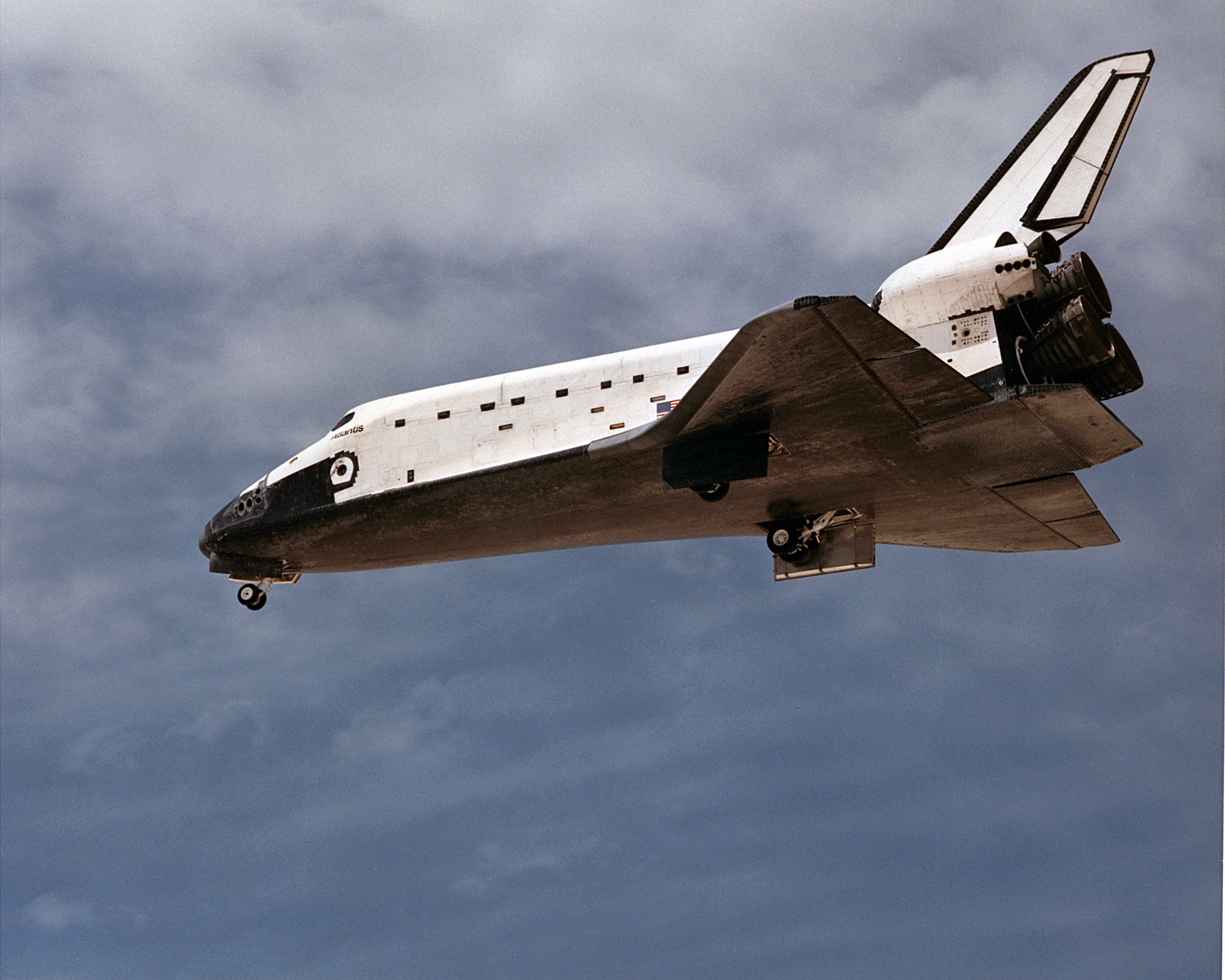
Atlantis deploys its landing gear before landing at the end of STS-30.

Attempt	Planned	Result	Turnaround	Reason	Decision point	Weather go (%)	Notes
1	28 Apr 1989, 2:29:00 pm	Scrubbed	—	Technical	28 Apr 1989, 2:30 pm (T−00:00:31)		Failure of circulation pump in Space Shuttle Main Engine (SSME) No. 1.
2	4 May 1989, 2:46:59 pm	Success	6 days 0 hours 18 minutes			60	Countdown held at T−5 minutes due to unacceptable cloud cover and excessive crosswinds at the Shuttle Landing Facility, which cleared in time for launch.

Space Shuttle Atlantis lifted off from Launch Complex 39B at Kennedy Space Center (KSC), Florida, at 14:46:59 EDT on May 4, 1989. The primary payload, the Magellan spacecraft with its attached Inertial Upper Stage (IUS), was successfully deployed later that day. Magellan was the first American planetary mission in 11 years.

The launch was originally scheduled for April 28, 1989, the first day of a 31-day launch period when Earth and Venus were properly aligned. However, the liftoff was scrubbed at T−31 seconds because of a problem with the liquid hydrogen recirculation pump on Space Shuttle Main Engine (SSME) No. 1, and a vapor leak in the liquid hydrogen recirculation line between the orbiter and external tank (ET). On the rescheduled liftoff date of May 4, 1989, the launch was again delayed until the final five minutes of the launch window due to cloud cover and excessive crosswinds at KSC's Shuttle Landing Facility (SLF). Good landing conditions were required at the SLF in case of a Return To Launch Site (RTLS) abort early in the flight.

The only major glitch during the flight occurred on May 7, 1989, when one of the four general-purpose computers programmed to operate the orbiter failed. The shuttle crew replaced the computer, part of a redundant set, with a backup one. It was the first time a computer had been replaced while in orbit. The glitch had no impact on the crew's safety or the primary objectives of the mission, although some of the activities involved in conducting experiments had to be canceled while the crew was replacing the computer. There also was no impact to the mission when one of the three thrusters on Atlantis' aft right-hand Orbital Maneuvering System (OMS) pod failed during ascent.

However, the STS-30 crew experienced several minor annoyances. A Hasselblad camera used to photograph sites on Earth had to be stowed for the remainder of the mission after a shutter stuck during the crew's third day in space. The Text and Graphics Systems (TAGS), a device to send images and graphics to the orbiter from Mission Control Center, had to be turned off on Flight Day 2 because of a paper jam. Commander Walker and Pilot Grabe had problems with a device used to take measurements of central venous pressure to determine the effects of microgravity on the cardiovascular system. On the second full day in space, the water dispensing system in the galley malfunctioned, causing some difficulties for the crew in preparing meals.

Atlantis touched down at Runway 22, Edwards Air Force Base, California, on May 8, 1989, at 15:43:27 EDT. Minutes before landing, the runway had to be switched from 17 to 22 due to high crosswinds. The mission lasted a total of 4 days, 0 hours, 56 minutes, and 28 seconds.

=== Payload and experiments ===
The Magellan spacecraft was deployed from the shuttle's payload bay six hours and 14 minutes into the mission. Two successive IUS propulsion burns placed the spacecraft on its trajectory to Venus about an hour later. Magellan arrived at Venus in August 1990 and began a 243-day mission of mapping the planet's surface with radar.

Three mid-deck experiments were included on the mission. All had flown before. Mission Specialist Cleave used a portable laptop computer to operate and monitor the Fluids Experiment Apparatus (FEA). An 8 mm (0.31 in) video camcorder, flown for the first time on the Shuttle, provided the opportunity for the crew to record and downlink on-orbit activities such as the FEA, which was a joint endeavor between Rockwell International and NASA. Payload bay video cameras were used to record storm systems from orbit as part of the Mesoscale Lightning Experiment.

== Wake-up calls ==
NASA began a tradition of playing music to astronauts during the Project Gemini, and first used music to awaken a flight crew during Apollo 15. Each track is specially chosen, often by the astronauts' families, and usually has a special meaning to an individual member of the crew, or is applicable to their daily activities.

Flight Day	Song	Artist/Composer
Day 2	Theme from the film "Superman"	
Day 3	Anchors Aweigh The Wild Blue Yonder; Colorado State University Fight Song; Florida State University Fight Song	
Day 4	"Gonna Fly Now" - Theme from Rocky	Bill Conti
Day 5	"A Hard Day's Night"	The Beatles

== Gallery ==
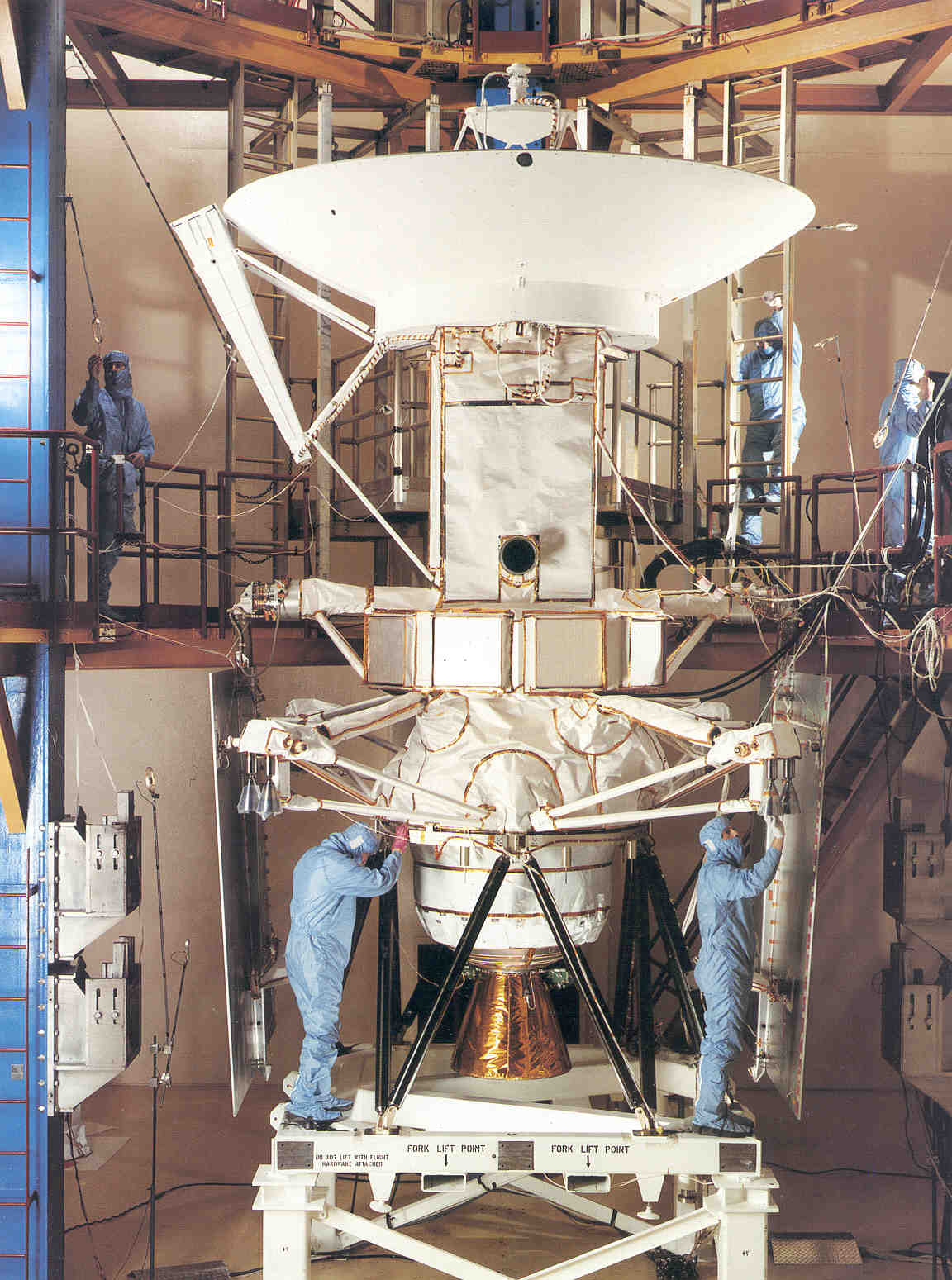
The Magellan probe being tested at Kennedy Space Center.

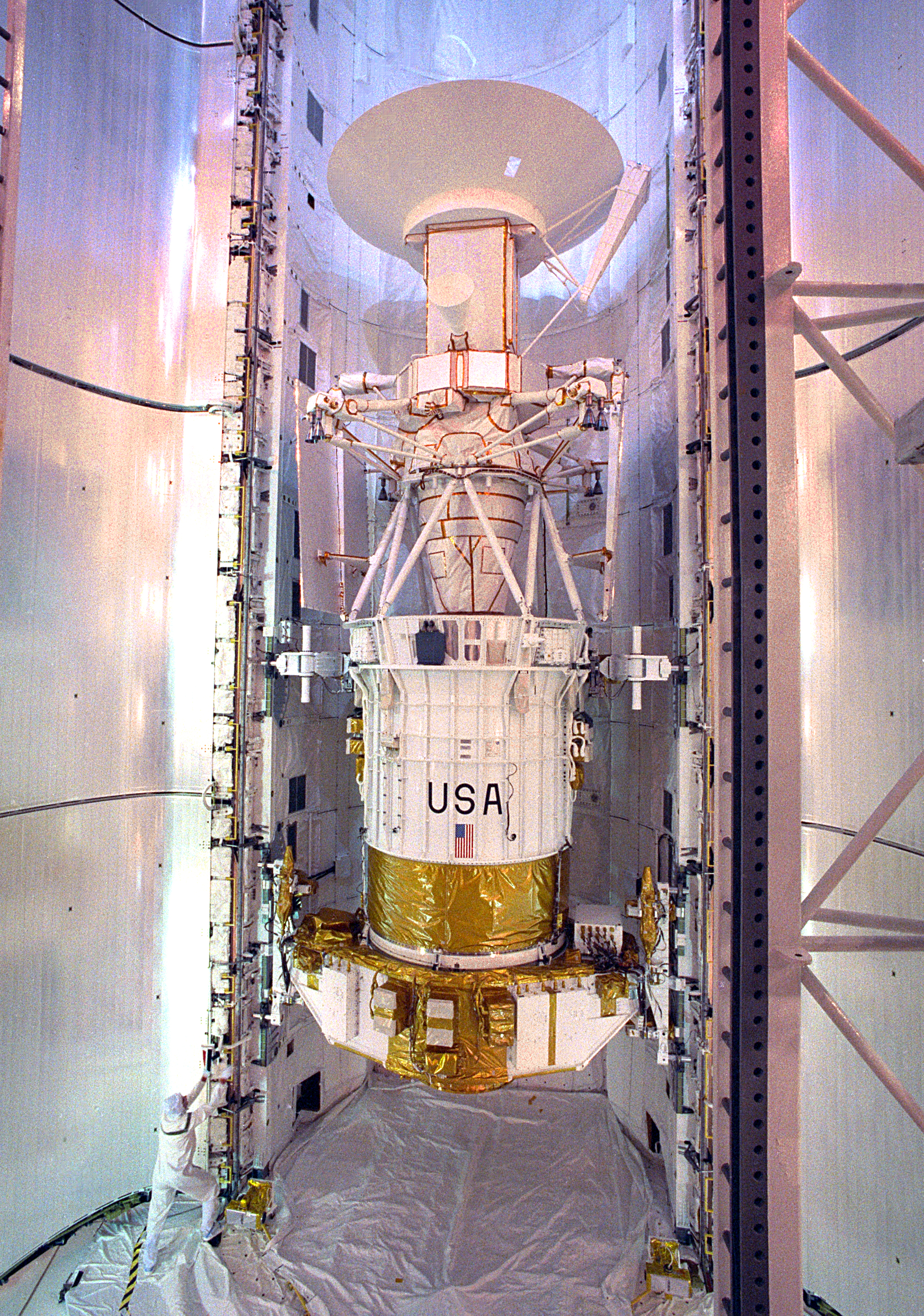
The probe imaged aboard Atlantis.

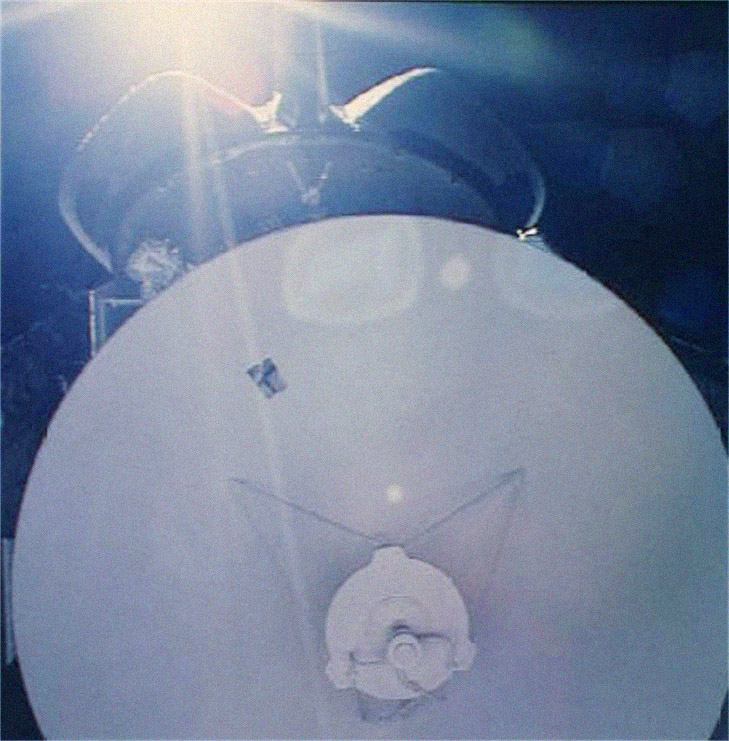
Magellan in its stowed position.

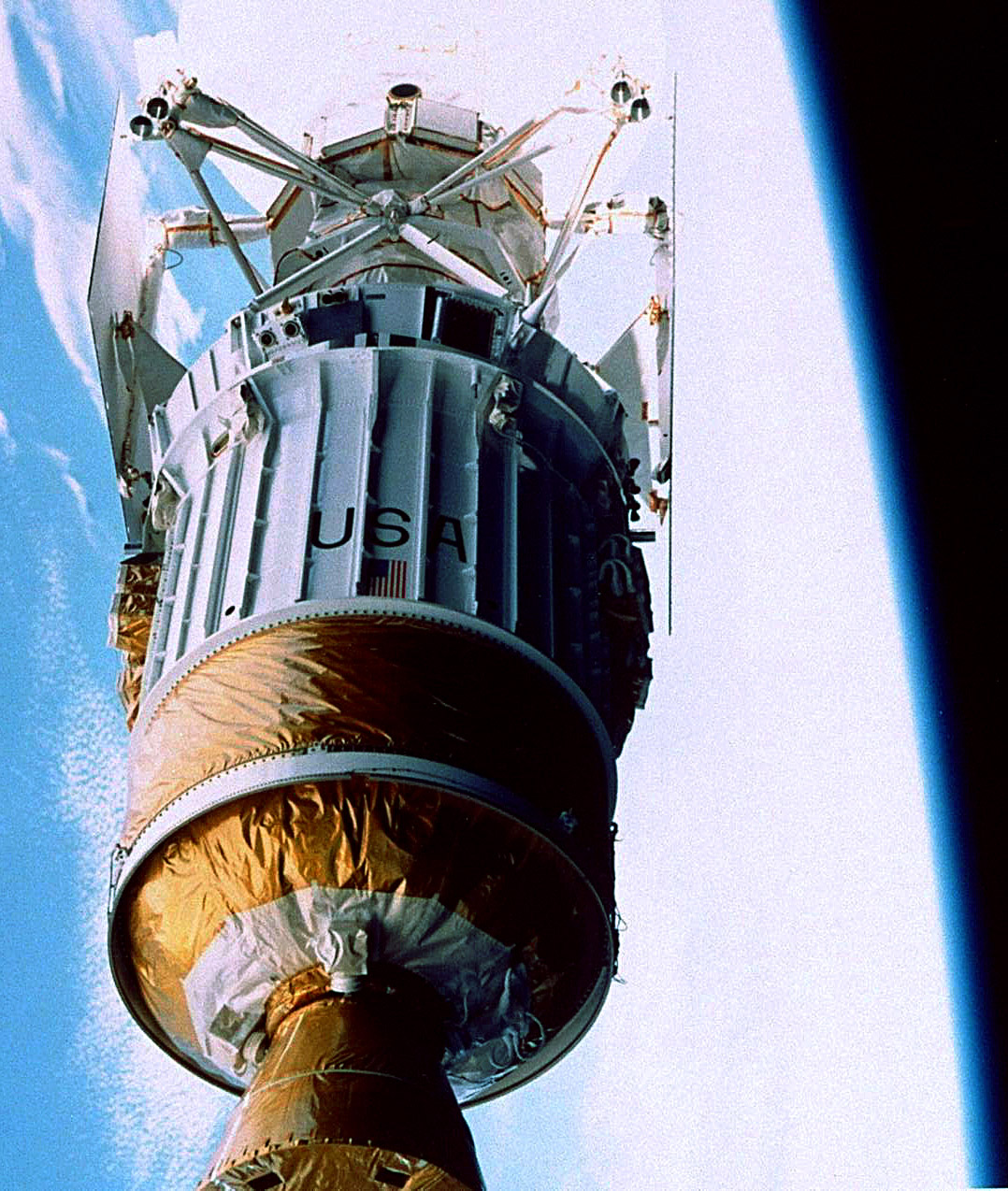
Magellan passes overhead.

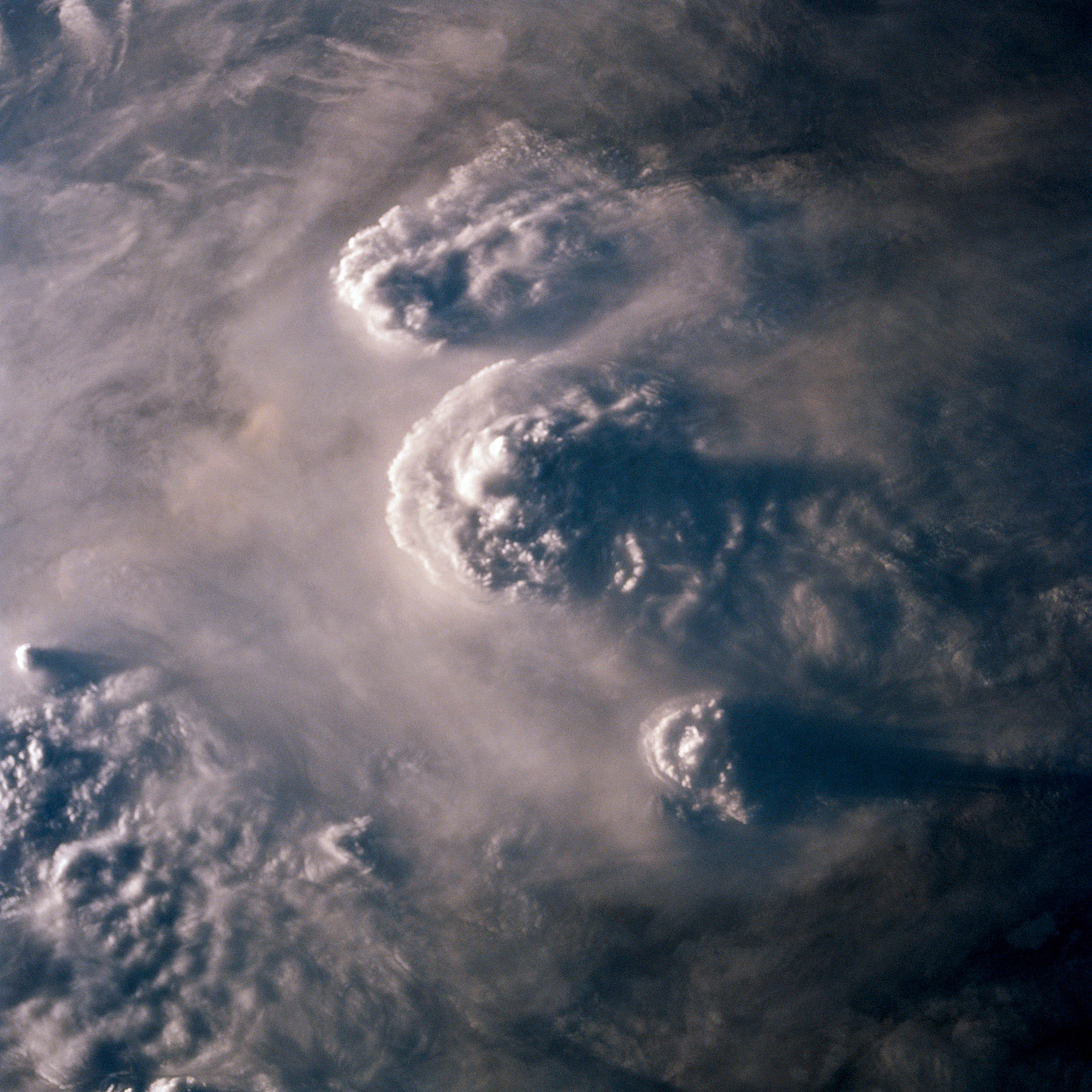
Thunderstorms imaged from orbit.

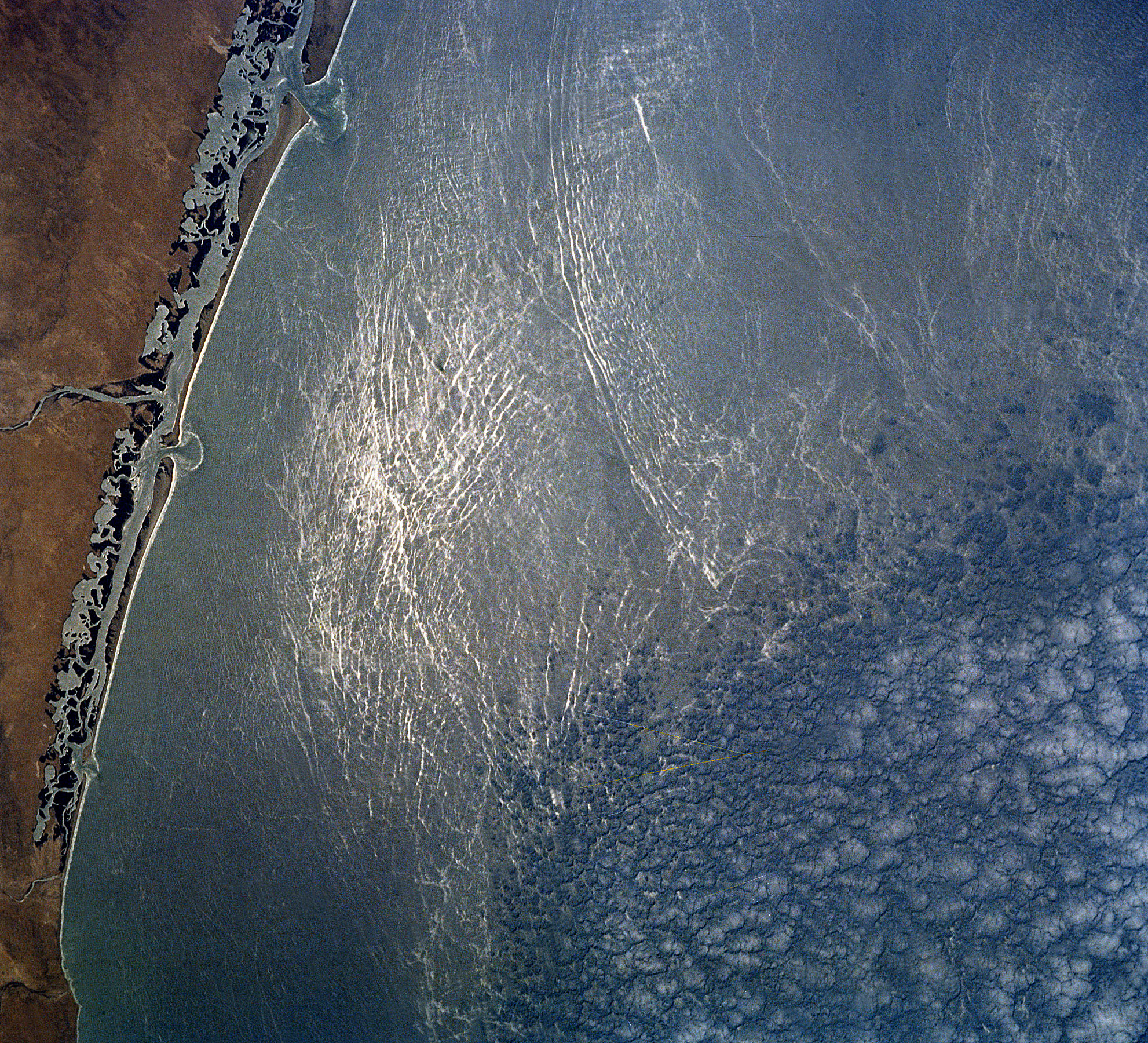
Ocean waves off the coast of Mexico imaged from orbit.

== See also ==
- List of human spaceflights
- List of Space Shuttle missions
