= David M. Walker (astronaut) =

American astronaut (1944–2001)

David Walker
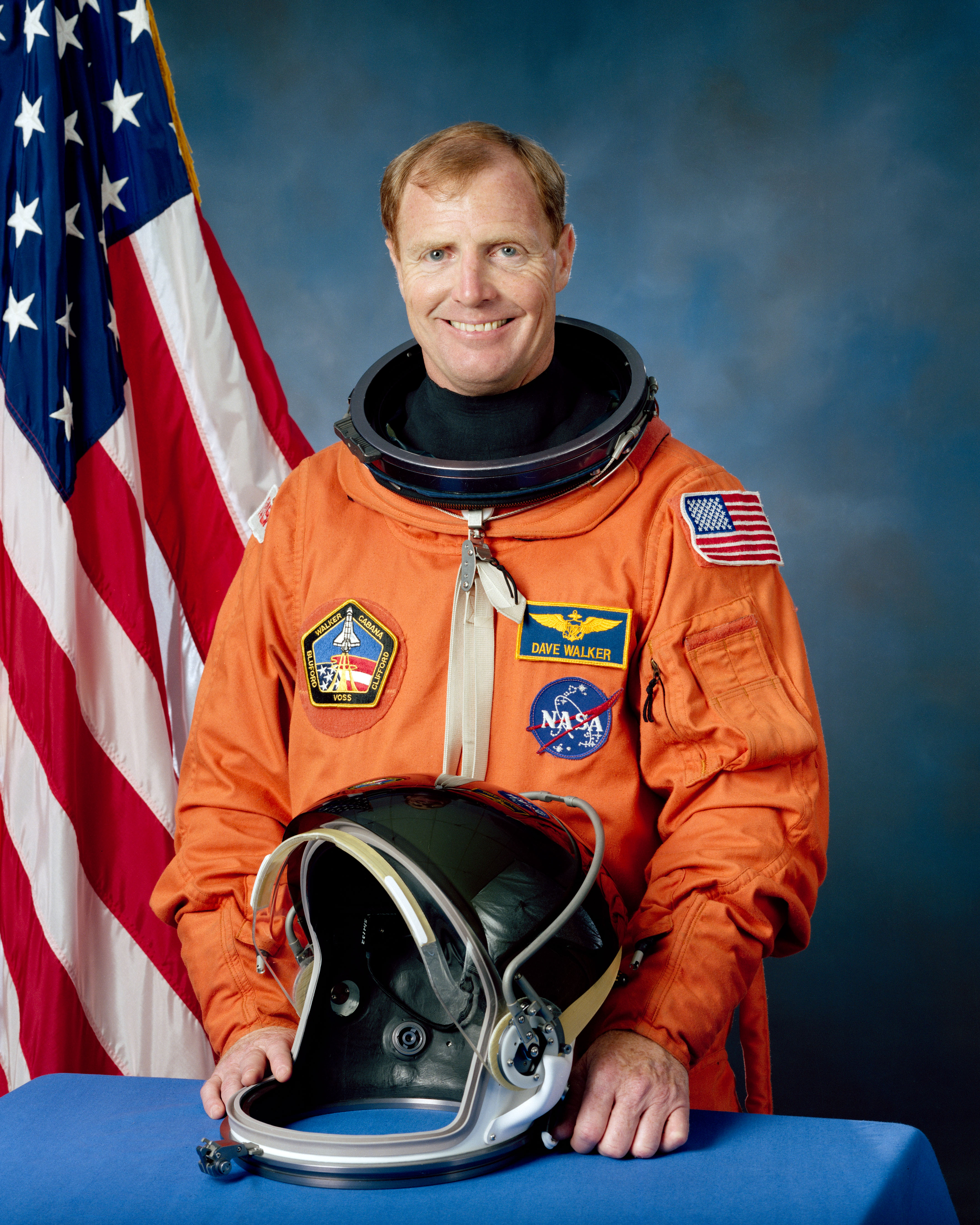
- Born: David Mathieson Walker; May 20, 1944; Columbus, Georgia, U.S.
- Died: April 23, 2001 (aged 56); Houston, Texas, U.S.
- Resting place: Arlington National Cemetery
- Education: United States Naval Academy (BS)
- Awards: Distinguished Flying Cross; NASA Distinguished Service Medal; Air Medal
- Space career

NASA astronaut
- Rank: Captain, USN
- Time in space: 30d 4h 27m
- Selection: NASA Group 8 (1978)
- Missions: STS-51-A; STS-30; STS-53; STS-69
- Retired: April 15, 1996

David Mathieson Walker (May 20, 1944 – April 23, 2001), (Capt, USN), was an American naval officer and aviator, fighter pilot, test pilot, and a former NASA astronaut. He flew aboard four Space Shuttle missions in the 1980s and 1990s.

== Personal life ==
Walker was born May 20, 1944, in Columbus, Georgia. In his youth, he was a Boy Scout with Troop 8 in Eustis, Florida, and earned its highest rank of Eagle Scout. He died on April 23, 2001, from cancer; he was 56 years old and was being treated at University of Texas M.D. Anderson Cancer Center in Houston, Texas. His wife, the former Paige Lucas, and two adult sons from a previous marriage survived him. He was interred at Arlington National Cemetery on May 24, 2001.

== Education ==
- 1962: Graduated from Eustis High School, Eustis, Florida.
- 1966: Received a Bachelor of Science degree from the United States Naval Academy.

== Military career ==
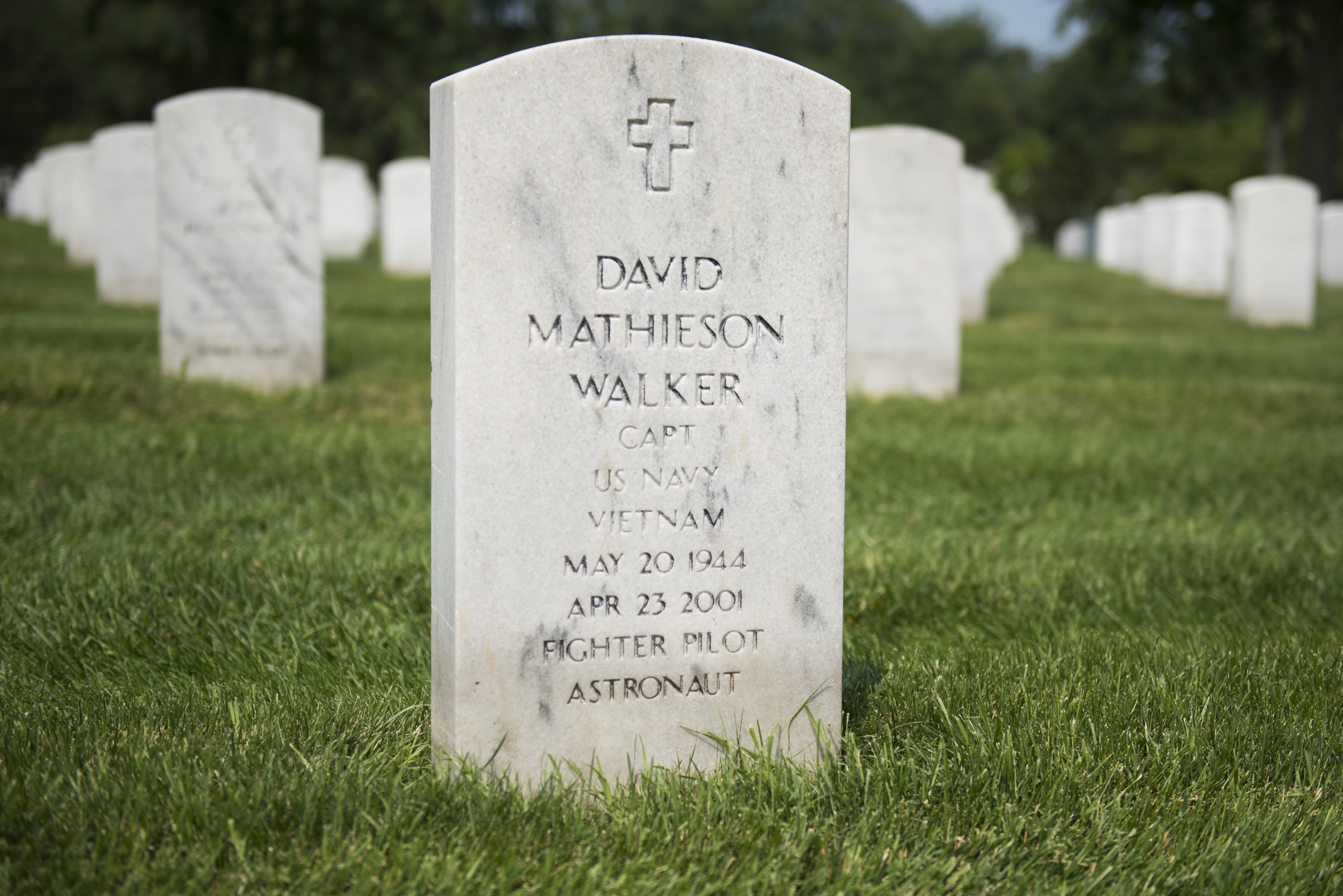
Grave at Arlington National Cemetery

Walker graduated from the U.S. Naval Academy at Annapolis, Maryland in 1966, was commissioned as an Ensign, and subsequently received flight training from the Naval Air Training Command at bases in Florida, Mississippi, and Texas. He was designated a Naval Aviator in December 1967 and proceeded to Naval Air Station Miramar, California, for assignment to fly the F-4 Phantom II. Upon graduation from Fighter Squadron 121 (VF-121), the F-4 Fleet Replacement Squadron at Miramar, he was assigned to a Fleet fighter squadron at Miramar and deployed overseas aboard the aircraft carriers USS Enterprise and USS America for combat cruises off of Vietnam. From December 1970 to 1971, he attended the U.S. Air Force Test Pilot School at Edwards Air Force Base, California, and was subsequently assigned in January 1972 as an experimental and engineering test pilot in the flight test division at the U.S. Naval Test Pilot School, NAS Patuxent River, Maryland. While there, he participated in the Navy's preliminary evaluation and Board of Inspection and Survey trials of the F-14 Tomcat and tested a leading edge slat modification to the F-4 Phantom. He then attended the United States Navy Safety Officer School at Monterey, California, and completed replacement pilot training in the F-14 Tomcat with Fighter Squadron 124 (VF-124) at NAS Miramar, California. In 1975, Walker was assigned to Fighter Squadron 142 (VF-142), stationed at NAS Oceana, Virginia, as a fighter pilot and was deployed to the Mediterranean Sea twice aboard the aircraft carrier USS America.

He logged more than 7,500 hours flying time, with over 6,500 hours in jet aircraft.

== NASA career ==
One of 35 candidates selected by NASA in January 1978 for the new Space Shuttle program, Walker became an astronaut in August 1979. Among his technical assignments, he served as Astronaut Office Safety Officer; technical assistant to the Director of Flight Crew Operations in 1981; a chase pilot on STS-1; software verification at the Shuttle Avionics Integration Laboratory (SAIL); mission support group leader for STS-5 and STS-6; Assistant to the Director, Flight Crew Operations; leader of the astronaut support team at Kennedy Space Center in 1985; Branch Chief, Space Station Design and Development; and Special Manager for Assembly, Space Station Project Office. From July 1993 to June 1994, Walker was Chief of the Station/Exploration Support Office, Flight Crew Operations Directorate, after which he chaired the JSC Safety Review Board.

A veteran of four spaceflights, Walker logged nearly 725 hours in space. He was the pilot on STS-51-A in 1984, and was the commander of STS-30 in 1989, STS-53 in 1992 and STS-69 in 1995.

Walker was in training to command STS-61-G, scheduled for a May 1986 launch when the Challenger disaster forced NASA to suspend all Shuttle flights. In 1989, while piloting a NASA T-38 Talon to Washington, D.C. for ceremonies honoring the crew of STS-30, Walker came within 100 ft (30 m) of striking a Pan Am jetliner. That encounter and other infractions of NASA flying rules caused him to be grounded from July to September 1990, costing him the command of STS-44.

=== Spaceflights ===
STS-51-A Discovery (November 8–16, 1984) was launched from and returned to land at Kennedy Space Center, Florida. During the mission the crew deployed two satellites, Canada's Anik D-2 (Telesat H), and Hughes' LEASAT-1 (Syncom IV-1). In the first space salvage mission in history, the crew also retrieved for return to Earth the Palapa B-2 and Westar VI satellites. Mission duration was 127 Earth orbits in 7 days, 23 hours, 44 minutes, 56 seconds.

STS-30 Atlantis (May 4–8, 1989) was launched from Kennedy Space Center, Florida. During the 4-day mission, the crew successfully deployed the Magellan Venus-exploration spacecraft, the first U.S. planetary science mission launched since 1978, and the first planetary probe to be deployed from the Shuttle. Magellan arrived at Venus in August 1990, and mapped over 95% of the surface of Venus. In addition, the crew also worked on secondary payloads involving fluid research in general, chemistry, and electrical storm studies. Following 64 orbits of the Earth, the STS-30 mission concluded with the first cross-wind landing test of the Shuttle Orbiter at Edwards Air Force Base, California.

STS-53 Discovery (December 2–9, 1992) was launched from the Kennedy Space Center, Florida, and also returned to land at Edwards Air Force Base, California. During 115 Earth orbits, the five-man crew deployed a classified Department of Defense payload DOD-1 and then performed several Military-Man-in-Space and NASA experiments. Mission duration was 175 hours, 19 minutes, 17 seconds.

STS-69 Endeavour (September 7–18, 1995) was launched from and returned to land at Kennedy Space Center, Florida. During the mission the crew successfully deployed and retrieved a SPARTAN satellite and the Wake Shield Facility. Also on board was the International Extreme Ultraviolet Hitchhiker payload, and numerous secondary payloads and medical experiments. Mission duration was 10 days, 20 hours, 28 minutes.

== Business career ==
In April 1996, Walker retired from the Navy and left NASA to become Vice President for sales and marketing for NDC Voice Communications in San Diego, California. He joined Ultrafast, Inc. of Malvern, Pennsylvania in April 1999 as Vice President of aerospace sales. Later he retired to McCall, Idaho, however he sometimes worked as a consultant to the Aerospace Industry. In 1998, Walker served as space technology consultant on the film Deep Impact.

== Organizations ==
- Associate Fellow of the Society of Experimental Test Pilots
- Senior Member of the American Institute of Aeronautics and Astronautics
- U.S. Naval Academy Alumni Association (Class of 1966)
- National Eagle Scout Association
- Former President of the Idaho Aviation Foundation
- Association of Space Explorers

== Awards and honors ==
- Defense Superior Service Medal
- Distinguished Flying Cross
- National Intelligence Medal of Achievement
- Legion of Merit
- Defense Meritorious Service Medals (2)
- Navy Air Medals (6)
- Battle Efficiency Ribbon
- National Defense Service Medal
- Armed Forces Expeditionary Medal
- NASA Distinguished Service Medals (2)
- NASA Outstanding Leadership Medal
- NASA Space Flight Medals (4)
- Vietnamese Cross of Gallantry
- Vietnam Service Medal
- Republic of Vietnam Campaign Medal

== See also ==
- List of Eagle Scouts
