= Ronald J. Grabe =

American astronaut (born 1945)

Ronald Grabe
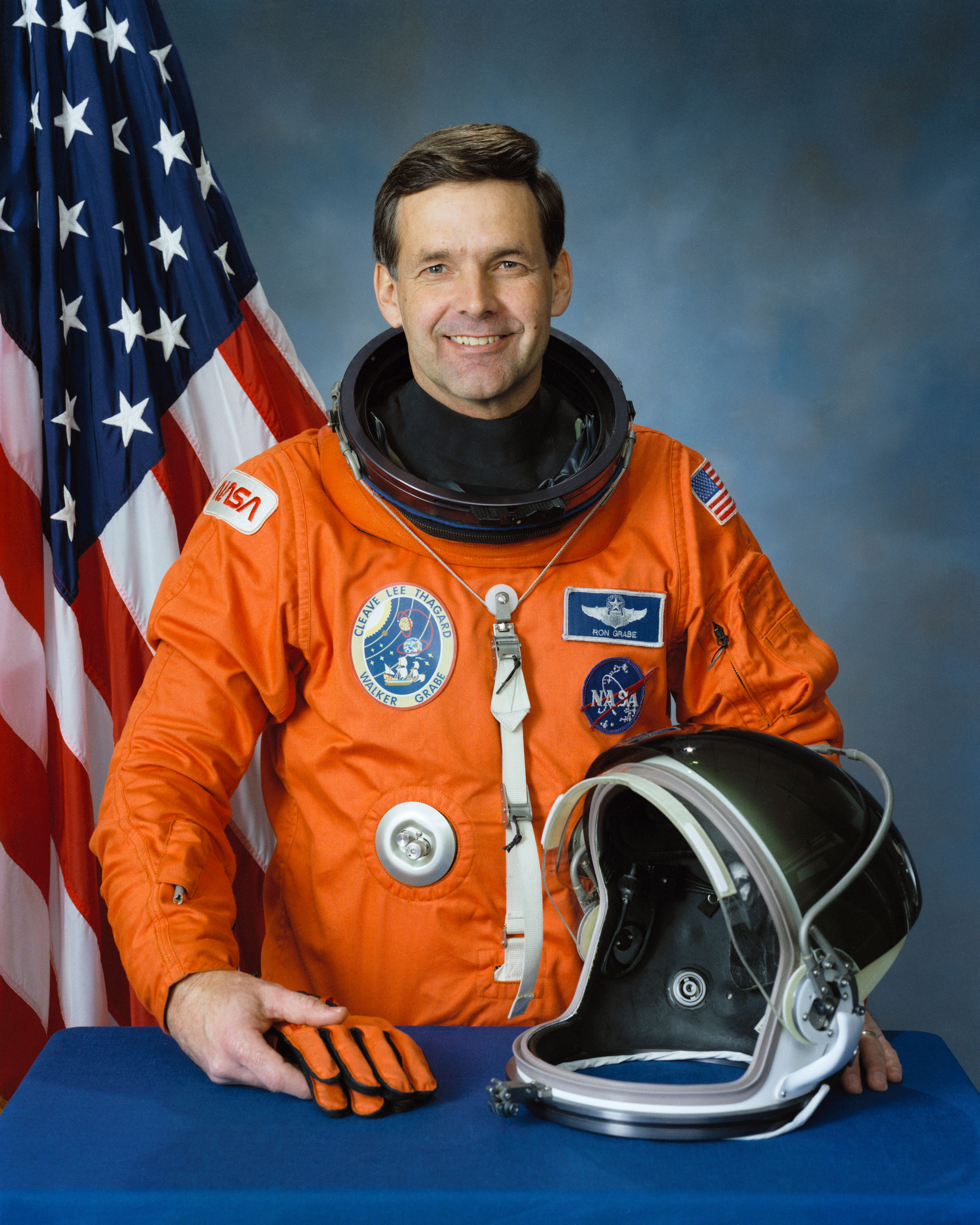
- Born: Ronald John Grabe; June 13, 1945 (age 81); New York City, New York, U.S.
- Education: United States Air Force Academy (BS); Technical University of Darmstadt
- Space career

NASA astronaut
- Rank: Colonel, USAF
- Time in space: 26d 3h 38m
- Selection: NASA Group 9 (1980)
- Missions: STS-51-J; STS-30; STS-42; STS-57
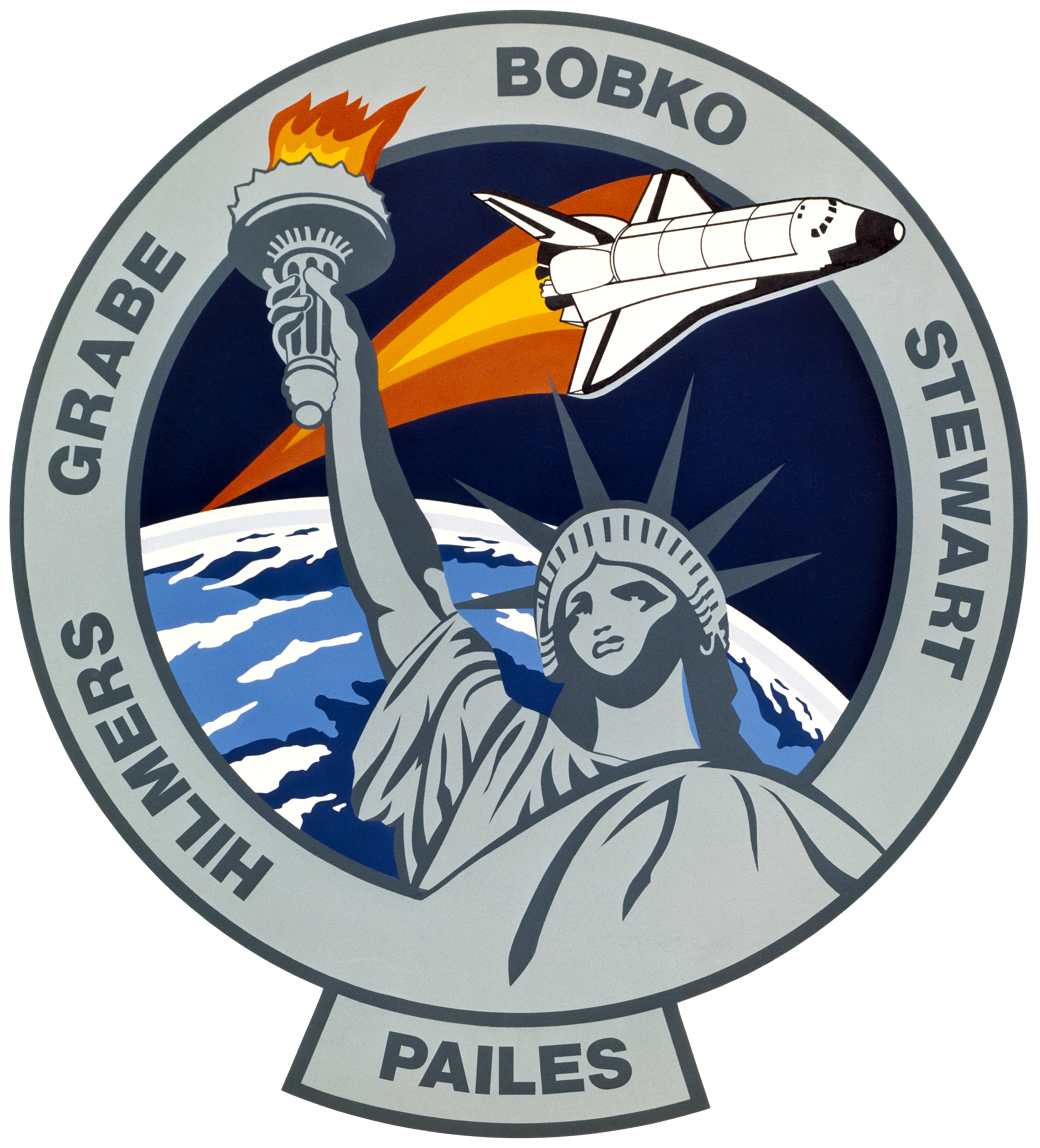
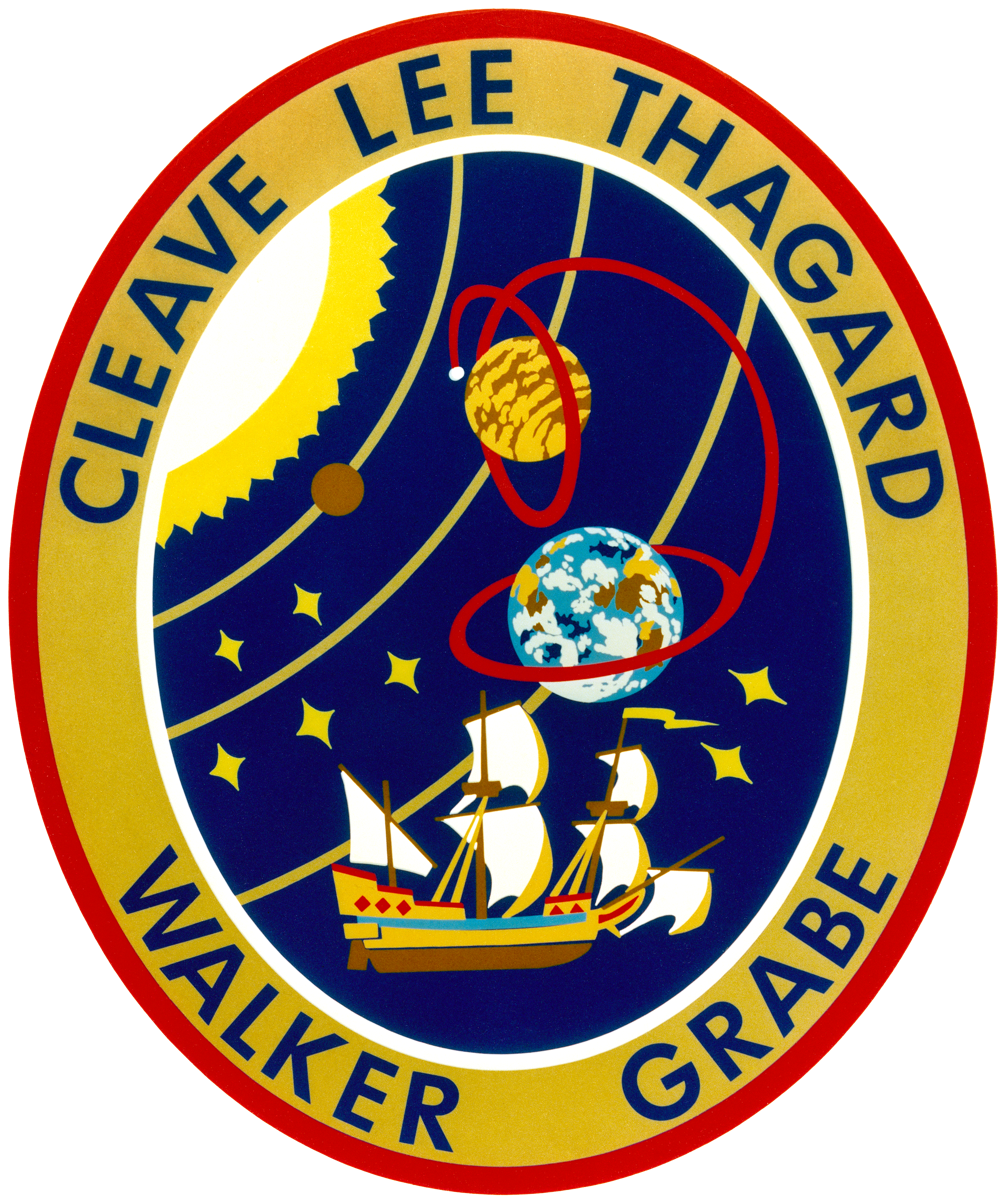
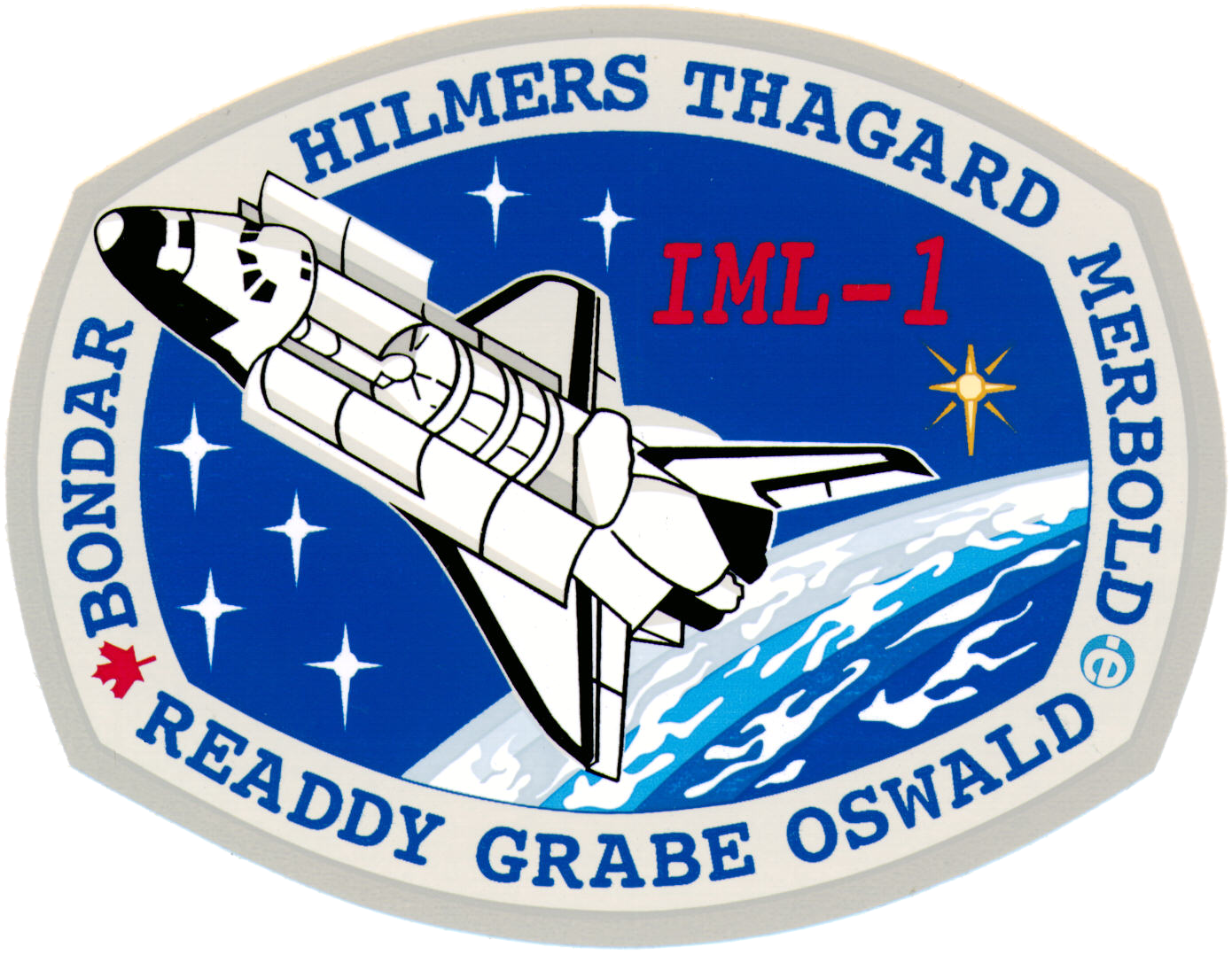
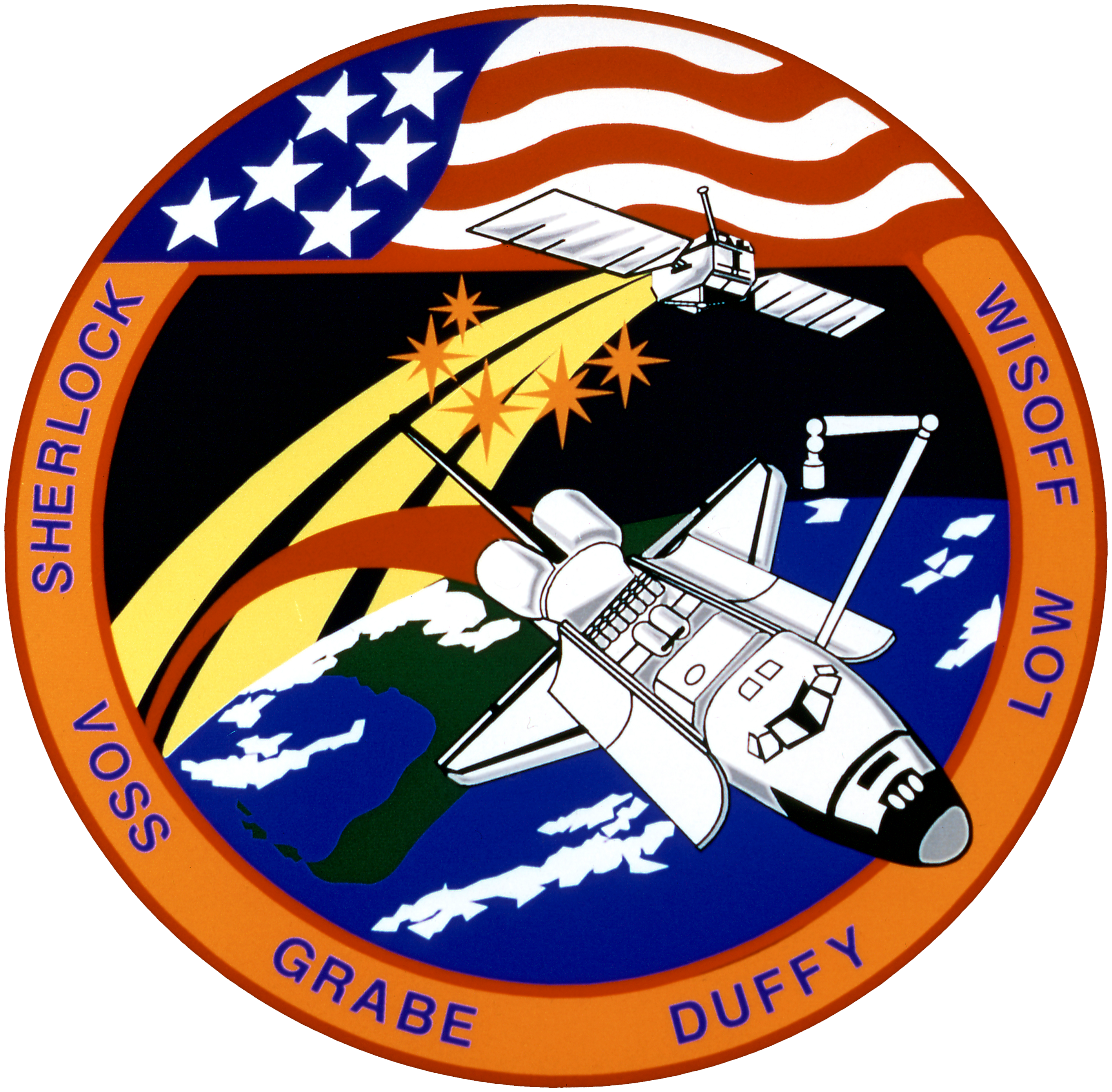
- Mission insignia

Ronald John Grabe (born June 13, 1945) is a former NASA astronaut and retired United States Air Force colonel.

He has earned the Air Force Distinguished Flying Cross, the Air Medal with 7 Oak Leaf Clusters, the Air Force Meritorious Service Medal, the Liethen-Tittle Award (for Outstanding Student at the USAF Test Pilot School), the Royal Air Force Cross, the NASA Exceptional Service Medal, and NASA Space Flight Medals.

== Education and early career ==
Grabe graduated from Stuyvesant High School (New York City) in 1962; earned a Bachelor of Science degree in Engineering Science from the United States Air Force Academy in 1966; and studied Aeronautics as a Fulbright Scholar at the Technische Hochschule (Darmstadt, West Germany) in 1967.

He returned to the United States in 1967 to complete pilot training at Randolph Air Force Base, Texas. He subsequently flew F-100 aircraft with the 27th Tactical Fighter Wing at Cannon Air Force Base, New Mexico, and in 1969 was assigned as an F-100 pilot with the 3d Tactical Fighter Wing at Bien Hoa Air Base in the Republic of Vietnam, where he flew 200 combat missions.

In 1970, he was reassigned to the 27th Tactical Fighter Wing at Cannon Air Force Base to fly F-100 and F-111 aircraft. He participated in the operational test and evaluation of the weapons system of the F-111D aircraft. Grabe attended the USAF Test Pilot School in 1974 and, upon graduating in 1975, was assigned to the Air Force Flight Test Center as a test pilot for the A-7 and F-111. He was the program manager and chief project pilot for the Air Force's digital flight control system for tactical fighters (DIGITAC) evaluation. He later served as an exchange test pilot with the Royal Air Force at Boscombe Down, United Kingdom, from 1976 to 1979. During this tour of duty, he served as the chief project pilot for the Royal Air Force Harrier and the Royal Navy Sea Harrier. He was an instructor at the USAF Test Pilot School at Edwards Air Force Base, California, when advised of his selection by NASA.

He has logged more than 5,500 hours flying time.

== NASA experience ==
Grabe became a NASA astronaut in August 1981. He has served as a chief verification pilot for STS-3 and STS-4 entry guidance, navigation and control simulation testing; as the Deputy Manager for Operations Integration, Space Shuttle Program Office; and subsequently as the Chief of Training within the Astronaut Office. A veteran of four space flights, Grabe served as pilot on STS-51-J (October 3–7, 1985) and STS-30 (May 4–8, 1989), and was the mission commander on STS-42 (January 22–30, 1992) and STS-57 (June 21 to July 1, 1993).

Grabe has logged over 627 hours in space. Effective April 11, 1994, Grabe left NASA and the Air Force to join Orbital Sciences Corporation, Dulles, Virginia.

== Space flight experience ==
STS-51-J, the second Space Shuttle Department of Defense mission, launched from Kennedy Space Center, Florida, on October 3, 1985. This was the maiden voyage of the Atlantis, the final Orbiter in the Shuttle fleet. After 98 hours of orbital operations, Atlantis landed at Edwards Air Force Base, California, on October 7, 1985. Mission duration was 97 hours, 14 minutes, 38 seconds.

STS-30 Atlantis launched from Kennedy Space Center, Florida, on May 4, 1989. During the four-day mission, the crew successfully deployed the Magellan Venus-exploration spacecraft, the first U.S. planetary science mission launched since 1978, and the first planetary probe to be deployed from the Shuttle. Magellan arrived at Venus in mid-1990, and mapped over 95% of the surface of Venus. Magellan has been one of NASA's most successful scientific missions and continues to operate today gaining information about the Venetian atmosphere and magnetic field. In addition, crew members also worked on secondary payloads involving fluid research in general, chemistry, and electrical storm studies. Following 64 orbits of the Earth, the STS-30 mission concluded with a landing at Edwards Air Force Base, California, on May 8, 1989. Mission duration was 96 hours, 57 minutes, 35 seconds.

STS-42 Discovery launched from the Kennedy Space Center, Florida, on January 22, 1992. Fifty-five major experiments conducted in the International Microgravity Laboratory-1 module were provided by investigators from eleven countries, and represented a broad spectrum of scientific disciplines. During 128 orbits of the Earth, the seven-person crew accomplished the mission's primary objective of investigating the effects of microgravity on materials processing and life sciences. In this unique laboratory in space, the crew worked around-the-clock in two shifts. Experiments investigated the microgravity effects on the growth of protein and semiconductor crystals. Biological experiments on the effects of zero gravity on plants, tissues, bacteria, insects and human vestibular response were also conducted. This eight-day mission culminated in a landing at Edwards Air Force Base, California, on January 30, 1992. Mission duration was 193 hours, 14 minutes, 45 seconds.

STS-57 Endeavour launched from the Kennedy Space Center, Florida, on June 21, 1993. The primary mission of this flight was the retrieval of the European Retrievable Carrier satellite (EURECA). Additionally, STS-57 featured the first flight of the Spacehab, a commercially provided middeck augmentation module for the conduct of microgravity experiments. Spacehab carried 22 individual flight experiments in materials processing and human factors. A spacewalk was conducted on this flight as part of an ongoing program to evaluate extravehicular activity (EVA) techniques for future missions. The Space Shuttle Endeavour landed at the Kennedy Space Center on July 1, 1993, after 10 days on orbit. Mission duration was 239 hours, 45 minutes.

He is married to the former Lynn O'Keefe of Ottawa, Canada. Ron has two daughters and he and Lynn have a son. Recreational interests include skiing, wind surfing, and racquet sports.
