= STS-57 =

1993 American crewed spaceflight

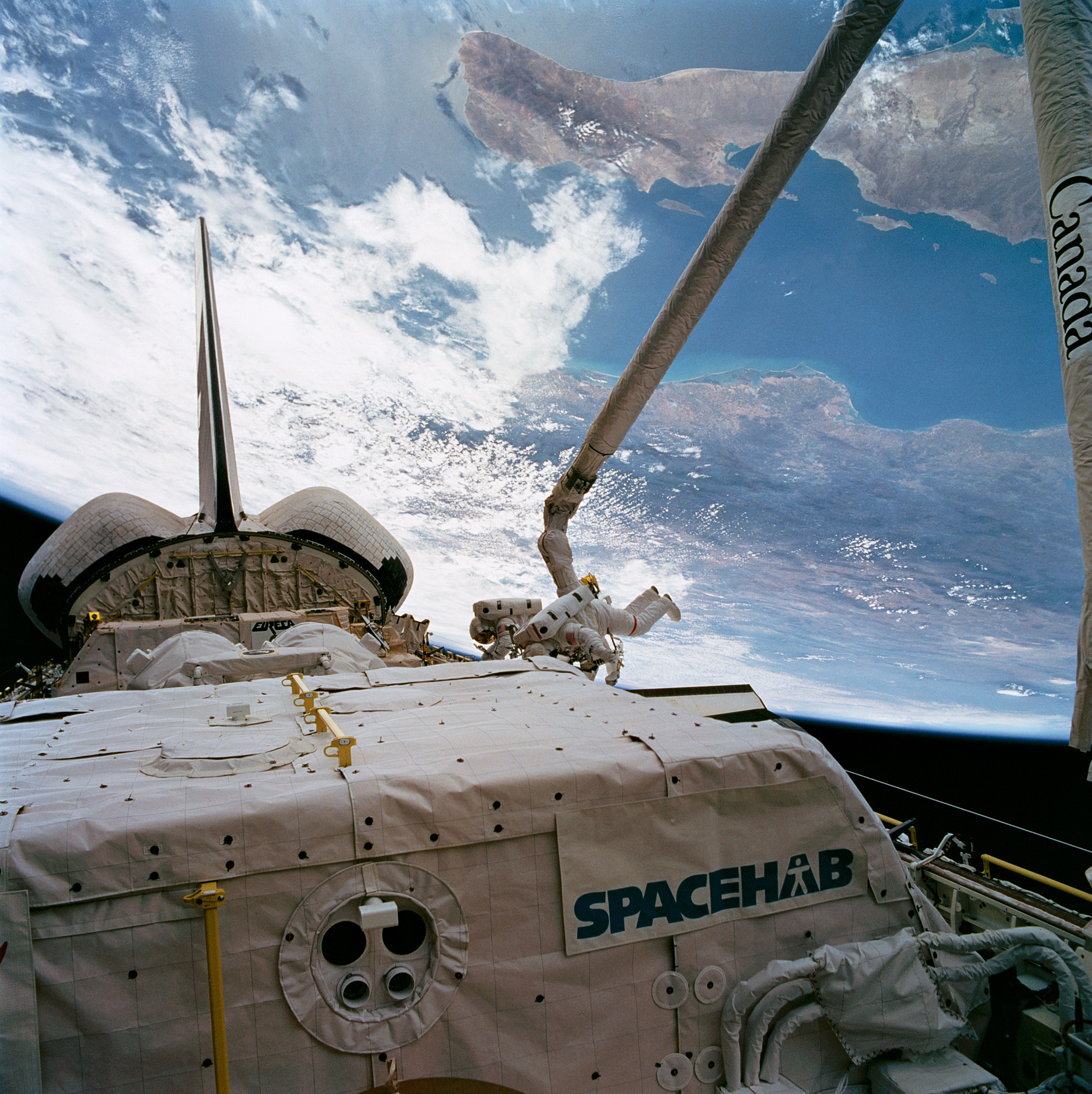
- Endeavour's payload bay, with the SpaceHab module (foreground), EURECA (background), and astronauts David Low and Peter Wisoff performing an EVA (center).
- Names: Space Transportation System-57
- Mission type: EURECA satellite retrieval Bioscience research
- Operator: NASA
- COSPAR ID: 1993-037A
- SATCAT no.: 22684
- Mission duration: 9 days, 23 hours, 44 minutes, 54 seconds
- Distance travelled: 6,627,338 km (4,118,037 mi)
- Orbits completed: 155

Spacecraft properties
- Spacecraft: Space Shuttle Endeavour
- Launch mass: 2,048,631 kg (4,516,458 lb)
- Landing mass: 101,827 kg (224,490 lb)
- Payload mass: 13,074 kg (28,823 lb)

Crew
- Crew size: 6
- Members: Ronald J. Grabe; Brian Duffy; G. David Low; Nancy J. Currie-Gregg; Peter Wisoff; Janice E. Voss
- EVAs: 1
- EVA duration: 5 hours and 50 minutes

Start of mission
- Launch date: June 21, 1993, 13:07:22 UTC (9:07:22 am EDT)
- Launch site: Kennedy, LC-39B
- Contractor: Rockwell International

End of mission
- Landing date: July 1, 1993, 12:52:16 UTC (8:52:16 am EDT)
- Landing site: Kennedy, SLF Runway 33

Orbital parameters
- Reference system: Geocentric orbit
- Regime: Low Earth orbit
- Perigee altitude: 402 km (250 mi)
- Apogee altitude: 471 km (293 mi)
- Inclination: 28.45°
- Period: 93.30 minutes

Instruments
- Fluid Acquisition and Resupply Experiment (FARE); Liquid Encapsulated Melt Zone (LEMZ); Shuttle Amateur Radio Experiment (SAREX-II)
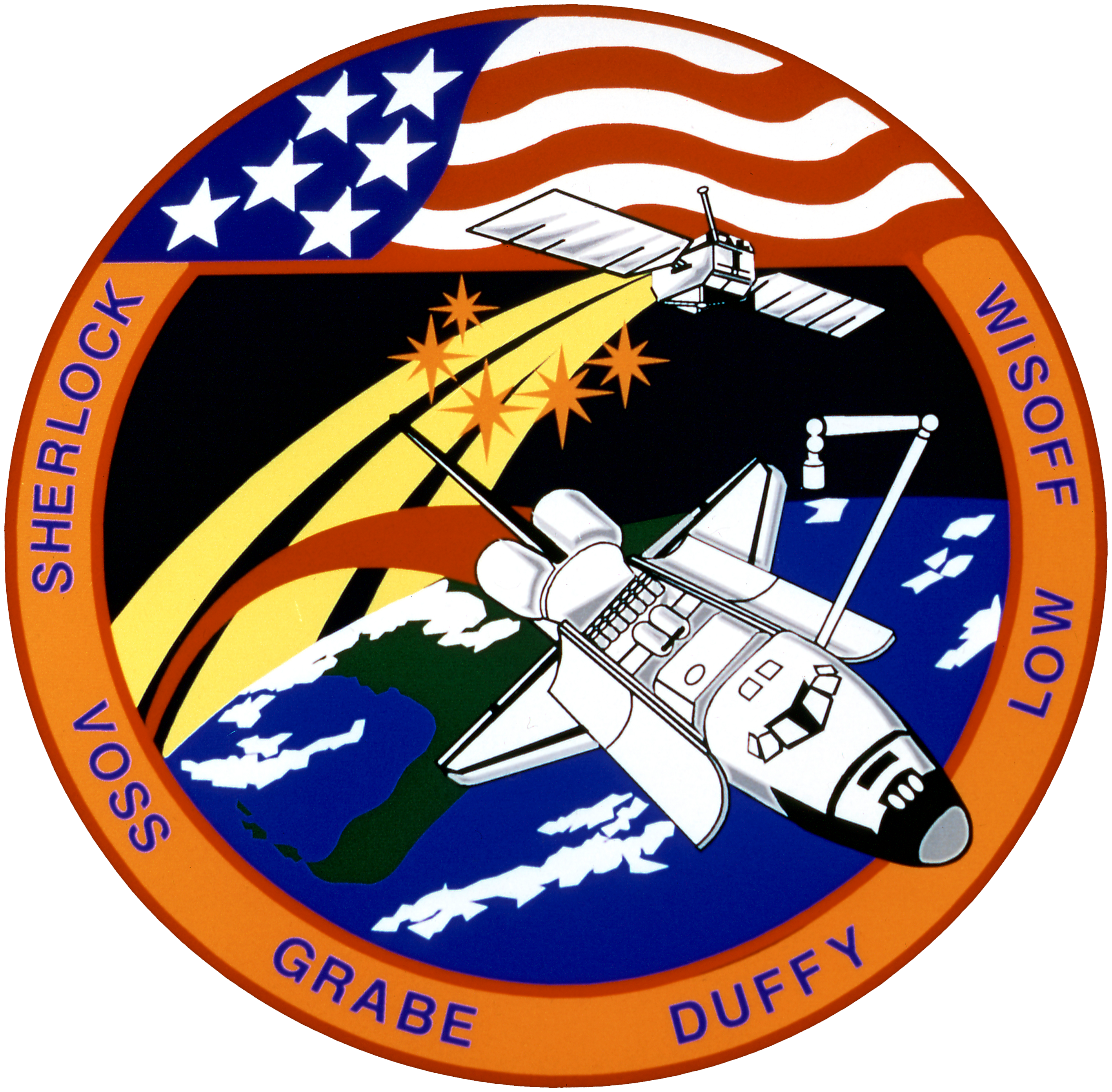
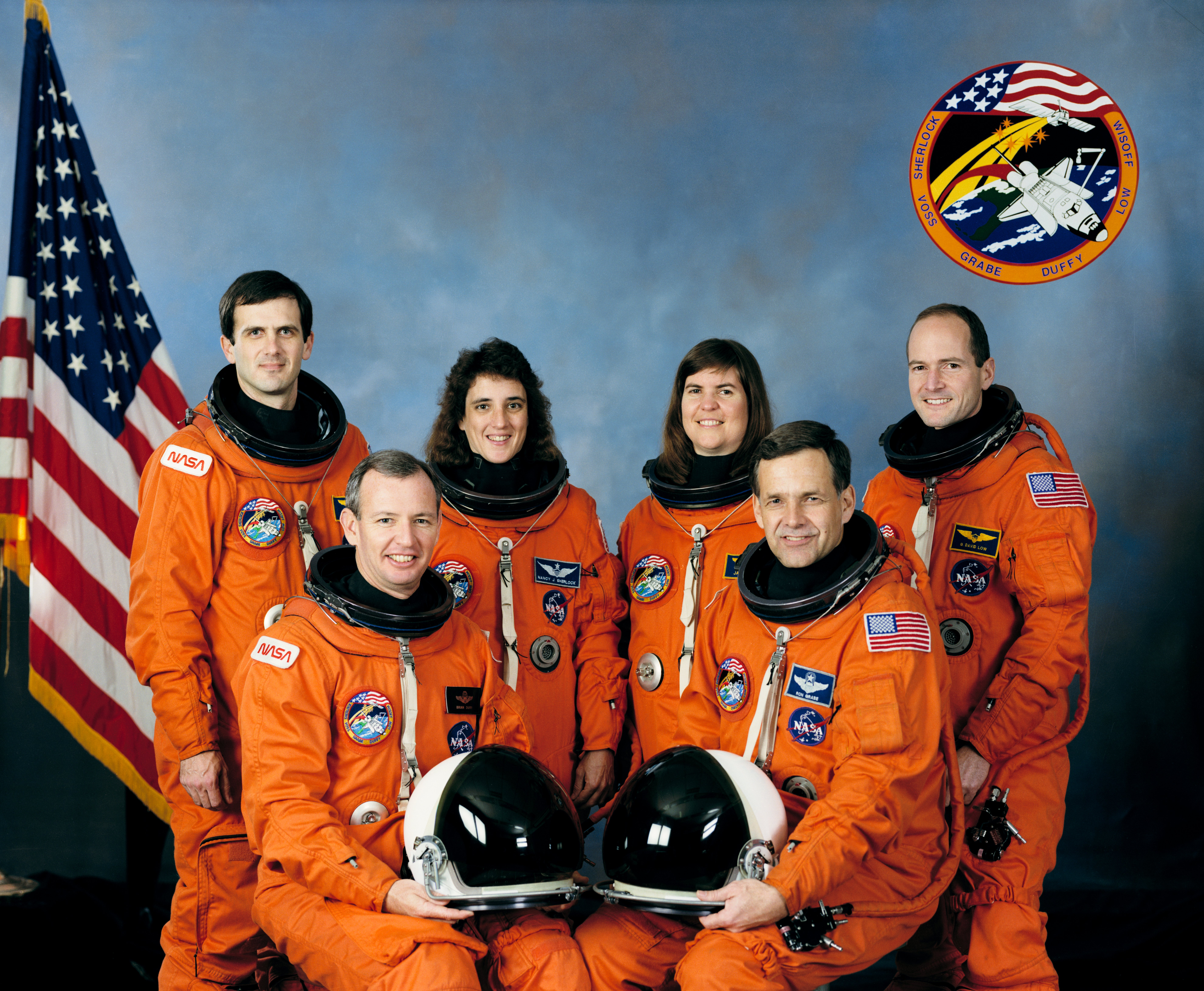
- STS-57 mission patch Back row: Wisoff, Currie-Gregg, Voss and Low; Front row: Duffy and Grabe Space Shuttle program

STS-57 was a NASA Space Shuttle-Spacehab mission of Space Shuttle Endeavour that launched June 21, 1993, from Kennedy Space Center, Florida.

== Crew ==
Position	Astronaut
Commander	Ronald J. Grabe; Fourth and last spaceflight
Pilot	Brian Duffy; Second spaceflight
Mission Specialist 1 Payload Commander	G. David Low; Third and last spaceflight
Mission Specialist 2 Flight Engineer	Nancy J. Currie-Gregg; First spaceflight
Mission Specialist 3	Peter Wisoff; First spaceflight
Mission Specialist 4	Janice E. Voss; First spaceflight

=== Spacewalk ===
- Personnel: Low and Wisoff
- Date: June 25, 1993 (13:07–18:57 UTC)
- Duration: 5 hours and 50 minutes

=== Crew seat assignments ===
Seat	Launch	Landing	Seats 1–4 are on the flight deck. Seats 5–7 are on the mid-deck.
1	Grabe		Seats 1–4 are on the flight deck. Seats 5–7 are on the mid-deck.
2	Duffy		Seats 1–4 are on the flight deck. Seats 5–7 are on the mid-deck.
3	Low	Wisoff	Seats 1–4 are on the flight deck. Seats 5–7 are on the mid-deck.
4	Currie-Gregg		Seats 1–4 are on the flight deck. Seats 5–7 are on the mid-deck.
5	Wisoff	Low	Seats 1–4 are on the flight deck. Seats 5–7 are on the mid-deck.
6	Voss		Seats 1–4 are on the flight deck. Seats 5–7 are on the mid-deck.
7	Unused		Seats 1–4 are on the flight deck. Seats 5–7 are on the mid-deck.

== Mission highlights ==
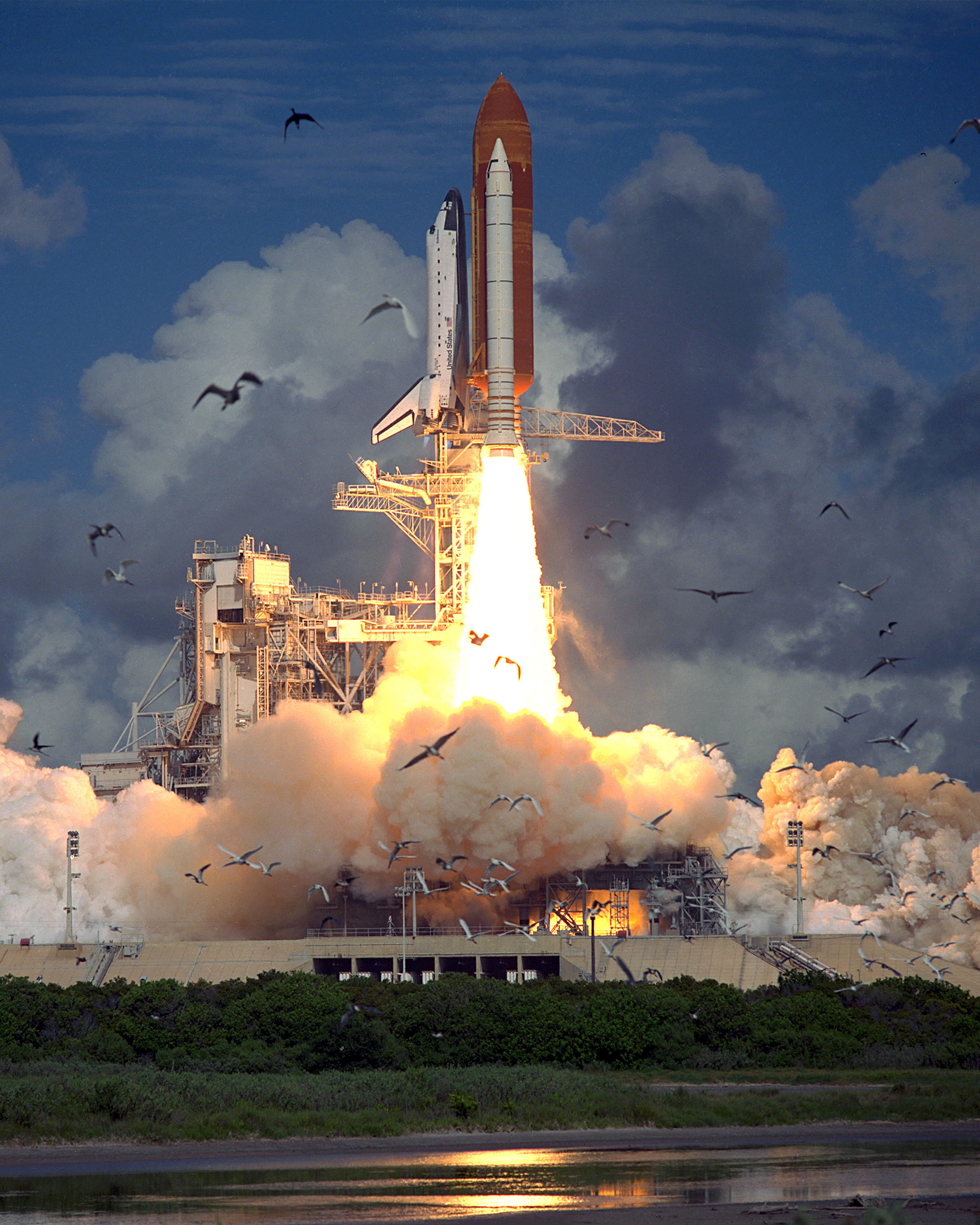
Liftoff of STS-57

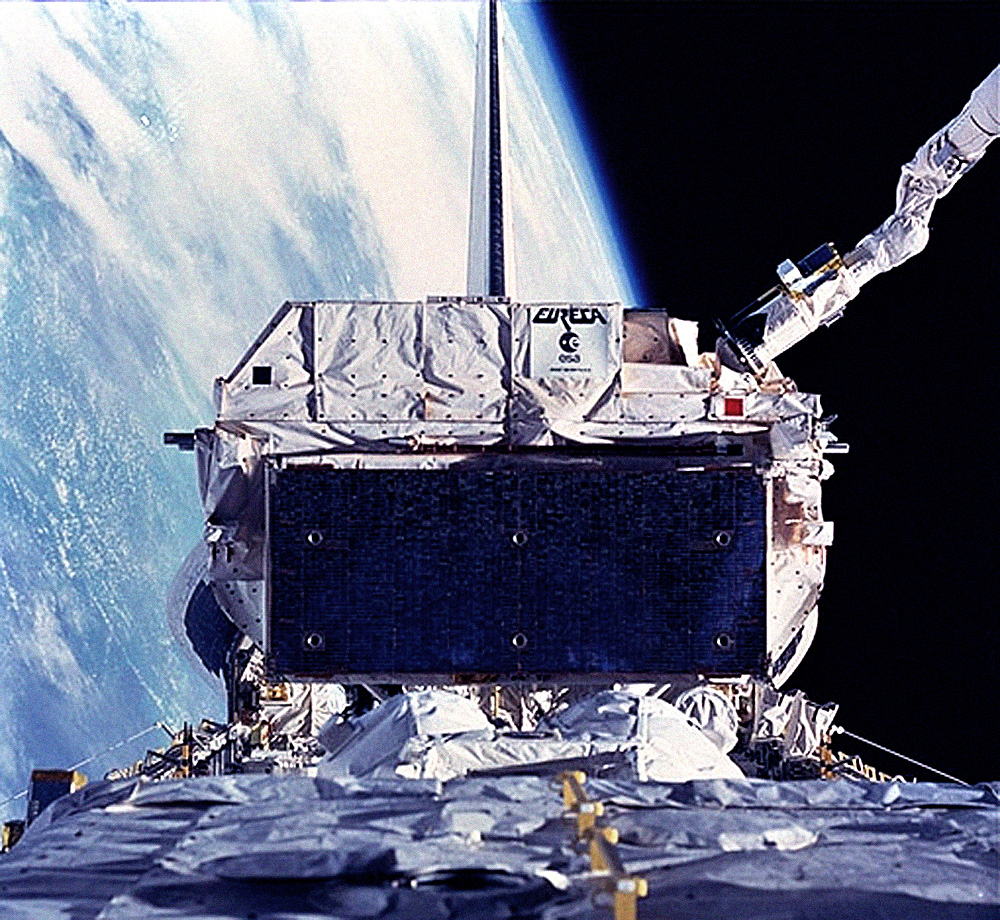
EURECA is stowed by Endeavour's remote manipulator system (Canadarm).

Attempt	Planned	Result	Turnaround	Reason	Decision point	Weather go (%)	Notes
1	20 Jun 1993, 9:37:00 am	Scrubbed	—	Weather	20 Jun 1993, 10:43 am (T−00:05:00)		Low clouds at KSC and Transoceanic Abort Landing (TAL) sites. The attempt occurred on pilot Duffy's 40th birthday.
2	21 Jun 1993, 9:07:22 am	Success	0 days 23 hours 30 minutes				Countdown held at T−5 minutes due to an intruding aircraft.

The mission was launched on the summer solstice. During the course of the ten-day flight, the astronauts successfully conducted scores of biomedical and materials sciences experiments inside the pressurized SPACEHAB module. Two astronauts participated in a spacewalk (EVA) and European Retrievable Carrier (EURECA) was retrieved by the crew and stowed inside Endeavour's payload bay. EURECA had been deployed from the Space Shuttle Atlantis in August 1992 (STS-46) and contained several experiments to study the long-term effects of exposure to microgravity.

An improperly installed electrical connector on Endeavour's Remote Manipulator System (Canadarm), installed 180° off its correct position, prevented EURECA from recharging its batteries with orbiter power. A flight rule requiring antenna stowage was waived and EURECA was lowered into the payload bay without latching its antenna. Mission specialists David Low and Peter Wisoff safely secured EURECA's dual antennas against the science satellite during the spacewalk. David Low was mounted on a foot restraint on the end of Endeavour's robotic arm while Mission specialist Nancy J. Currie-Gregg positioned the arm so David Low could gently push the arms against EURECA's latch mechanisms. Payload controllers then drove the latches to secure each antenna. The five-hour, fifty-minute spacewalk completed STS-57 mission's primary goal of retrieving the EURECA science satellite. Afterwards, Low and Wisoff completed maneuvers for an abbreviated extravehicular activity (EVA) Detailed Test Objective (DTO) using the robot arm. Activities associated with each of the areas of investigation — mass handling, mass fine alignment and high torque — were completed with both EVA crewmen taking turns on the robot arm. Low and Wisoff wrapped up their spacewalk and returned to Endeavour's airlock shortly before 3:00 p.m. CDT.

During the rest of the mission, the crew worked on experiments in the Spacehab module in the Shuttle's lower deck. These experiments included studying body posture, the spacecraft environment, crystal growth, metal alloys, wastewater recycling and the behavior of fluids. Among the experiments was an evaluation of maintenance equipment that may be used on Space Station Freedom. The diagnostic equipment portion of the Tools and Diagnostics System experiment was performed by Nancy J. Currie-Gregg. Using electronics test instruments including an oscilloscope and electrical test meter, Currie-Gregg conducted tests on a mock printed circuit board and communicated with ground controllers via computer messages on suggested repair procedures and their results.

On June 22, 1993, all six crew members talked with President Clinton.

In addition, Brian Duffy and Jeff Wisoff ran experiments in transferring fluids in weightlessness without creating bubbles in the fluid. The experiment, called the Fluid Acquisition and Resupply Experiment (FARE), studied filters and processes that could improve methods of refueling spacecraft in orbit. By transferring water between 61 cm (24 in)-diameter transparent tanks on Endeavour's middeck, engineers evaluated how the fluids behaved while the shuttle's steering jets fired for small maneuvers. Janice Voss worked on the Liquid Encapsulated Melt Zone (LEMZ) experiment, which used a process called floating zone crystal growth. The low-gravity conditions of space flight permit large crystals to be grown in space.

Ron Grabe, Brian Duffy and Janice Voss participated in the Neutral Body Position study. Flight surgeons had noted on previous flights that the body's basic posture changes while in microgravity. This postural change, sometimes called the "zero-g crouch", is in addition to the 26 mm (1.0 in) to 51 mm (2.0 in) lengthening of the spine during space missions. To better document this phenomenon over the duration of a space mission, still and video photography of crew members in a relaxed position were taken early and late in the mission. Researchers included these findings in the design specifications of future spacecraft to make work stations and living areas more efficient and comfortable for astronauts.

Currie-Gregg conducted the electronics procedures portion of the Human Factors Assessment. She set up a work platform, then hooked up a notebook computer and went through a simulated computer procedure for a space station propulsion system.

On June 28, 1993, Currie-Gregg performed an impromptu plumbing job on the Environmental Control Systems Flight Experiment, a study of wastewater purification equipment that may be used aboard future spacecraft. The EFE used a solution of water and potassium iodide to simulate wastewater, which was then pumped through a series of filters to purify it. During the flight, experimenters observed a reduced flow of water through the device and opted to perform maintenance. Currie-Gregg loosened a fitting on one water line inside the experiment, wrapped the loose fitting with an absorbent diaper, and, using a laptop computer on board, reversed a pump on the experiment for about 20 minutes in an attempt to flush out the clog. She then retightened the fitting and resumed normal operation of the experiment. Ground experimenters proceeded to monitor the EFE for about an hour and a half to ensure the clog had been cleared.

== Mission insignia ==
The five stars and shape of the robotic arm of the insignia symbolize the flight's numerical designation in the Space Transportation System's mission sequence. The SpaceHab overall contours are represented as the inner red lining of the patch. Also visible is the EURECA, with 3 yellow contrails, that are representative of the astronaut insignia (EURECA replacing the traditional star atop), with the orbiter circling the Earth.

== See also ==
- List of human spaceflights
- List of Space Shuttle missions
- Outline of space science
- Space Shuttle
