= Neutral body posture =

Posture the human body naturally assumes in microgravity

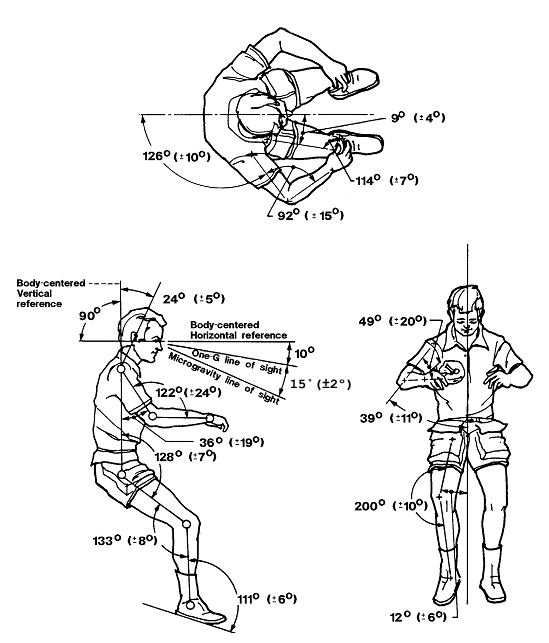
An averaged neutral body position as defined in MSIS

The neutral body posture (NBP) is the posture the human body naturally assumes in microgravity. Adopting any other posture while floating requires muscular effort. In the 1980s, NASA developed the Man-System Integration Standards (MSIS), a set of guidelines based on anthropometry and biomechanics, which included a definition of an average typical NBP created from measurements of crew members in the microgravity environment onboard Skylab. Still photographs taken on Skylab of crew members showed that in microgravity, the body assumed a distinguishable posture with the arms raised, the shoulder abducted, the knees flexed with noticeable hip flexion, and the foot plantar flexed.

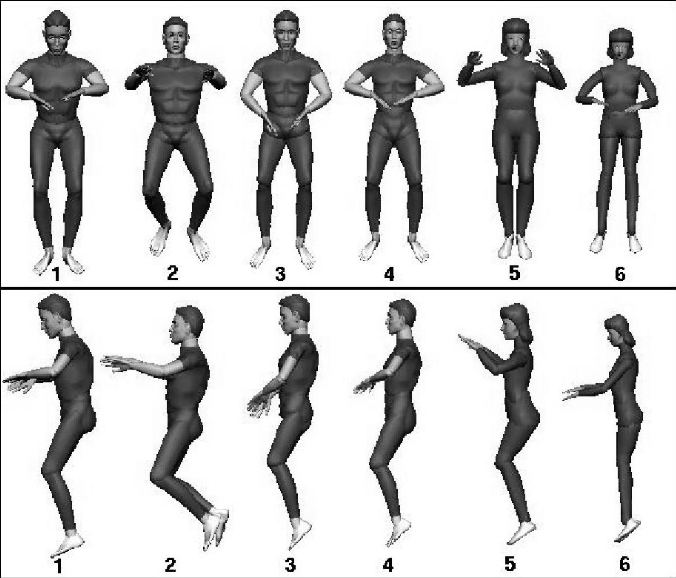
Neutral body postures for six crew members from Space Shuttle mission STS-57

Later work by NASA based on research aboard Space Shuttle mission STS-57 found greater individual variations between crew members' neutral body positions than originally suggested by the earlier Skylab study. In general, three main postures were exhibited by the crew as a whole. These constituted (1) an almost standing posture, (2) a slightly pitched forward posture with an extreme bend at the knees, and (3) an elongated posture with a straight neck. Differences in posture exhibited in this study could be a result of the athletic bearing of the participants or the type of exercise, or both, and the amount of exercise regularly performed. Other differences may also stem from past physical injuries such as bone breaks and knee or shoulder injuries, and from gender differences such as center of gravity. No single crew member exhibited the typical NBP called out in the MSIS standard.

The neutral body posture occurs during a state of weightlessness and minimizes the body's need to support itself against the pull of gravity. This offloads musculoskeletal stress and reduces pressure on the diaphragm and spine. Neutral body posture supports the natural curvature of the spine. A neutral spine that is not experiencing mechanical stress will curve inward at the neck (cervical region), outward at the upper back (thoracic region), and inward at the lower back (lumbar region).

NASA standards for the neutral body position have informed seat design for commercial vehicle manufacturers. In 2005, engineers and scientists at Nissan Motor Company used NBP research in the development of driver's seats in their new vehicles.

== See also ==
- Fetal position
