= Gernhardt =

Gernhardt is a surname of German origin. Notable people with the surname include:

- Leopold Gernhardt (1920–2013), German footballer and manager
- Michael L. Gernhardt (born 1956), American astronaut
- Ralph Paul Gernhardt (1934–2006), American publisher
- Robert Gernhardt (1937–2006), German writer, artist and poet
