= STS-83 =

Unsuccessful 1997 American crewed spaceflight

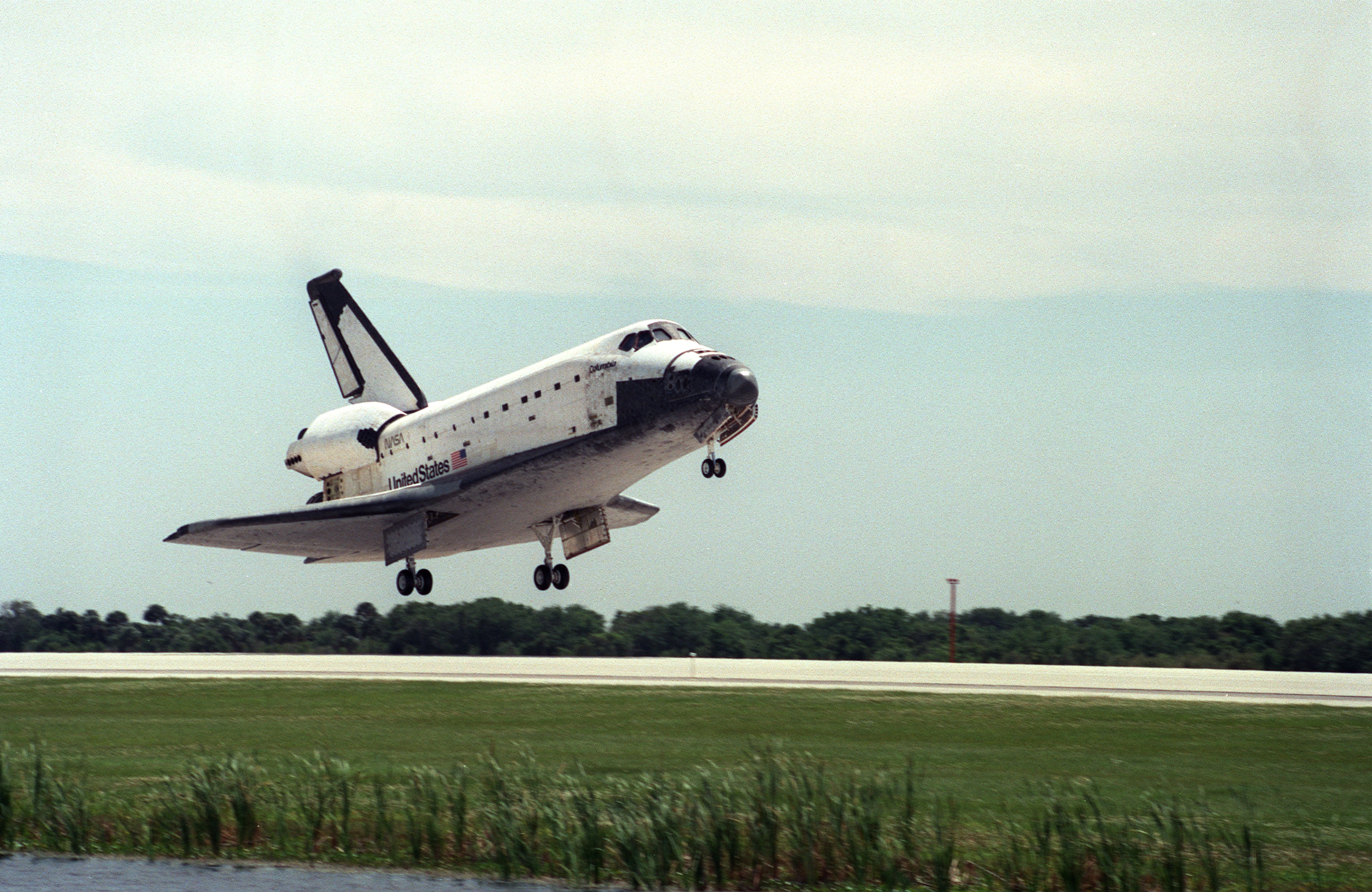
- Columbia lands at Kennedy, following an abort of the mission due to a fuel cell malfunction
- Mission type: Microgravity research
- Operator: NASA
- COSPAR ID: 1997-013A
- SATCAT no.: 24755
- Mission duration: Actual: 3 days, 23 hours, 12 minutes and 39 seconds Planned: 15 days and 16 hours
- Distance travelled: 2,400,000 km (1,500,000 mi)

Spacecraft properties
- Spacecraft: Space Shuttle Columbia
- Launch mass: 117,546 kg (259,144 lb)
- Landing mass: 106,724 kg (235,286 lb)
- Payload mass: 11,377 kg (25,082 lb)

Crew
- Crew size: 7
- Members: James D. Halsell; Susan L. Still; Janice E. Voss; Michael L. Gernhardt; Donald A. Thomas; Roger K. Crouch; Gregory T. Linteris

Start of mission
- Launch date: April 4, 1997, 19:20:32 UTC (14:20:32 EST)
- Launch site: Kennedy, LC-39A

End of mission
- Landing date: April 8, 1997, 18:33:11 UTC (14:33:11 EDT)
- Landing site: Kennedy, SLF Runway 33

Orbital parameters
- Reference system: Geocentric orbit
- Regime: Low Earth orbit
- Perigee altitude: 298 km (185 mi)
- Apogee altitude: 302 km (188 mi)
- Inclination: 28.45°
- Period: 90.5 minutes
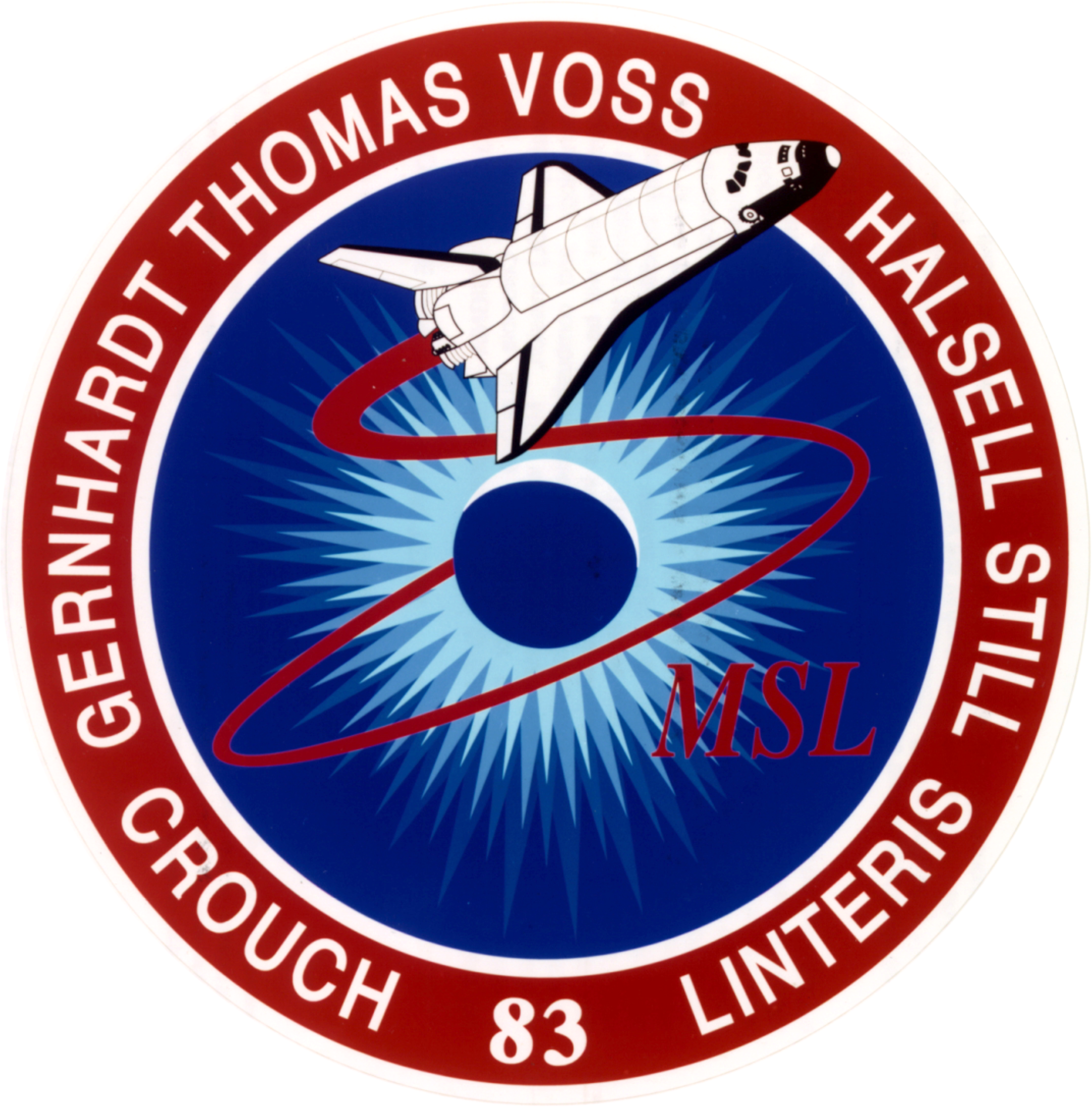
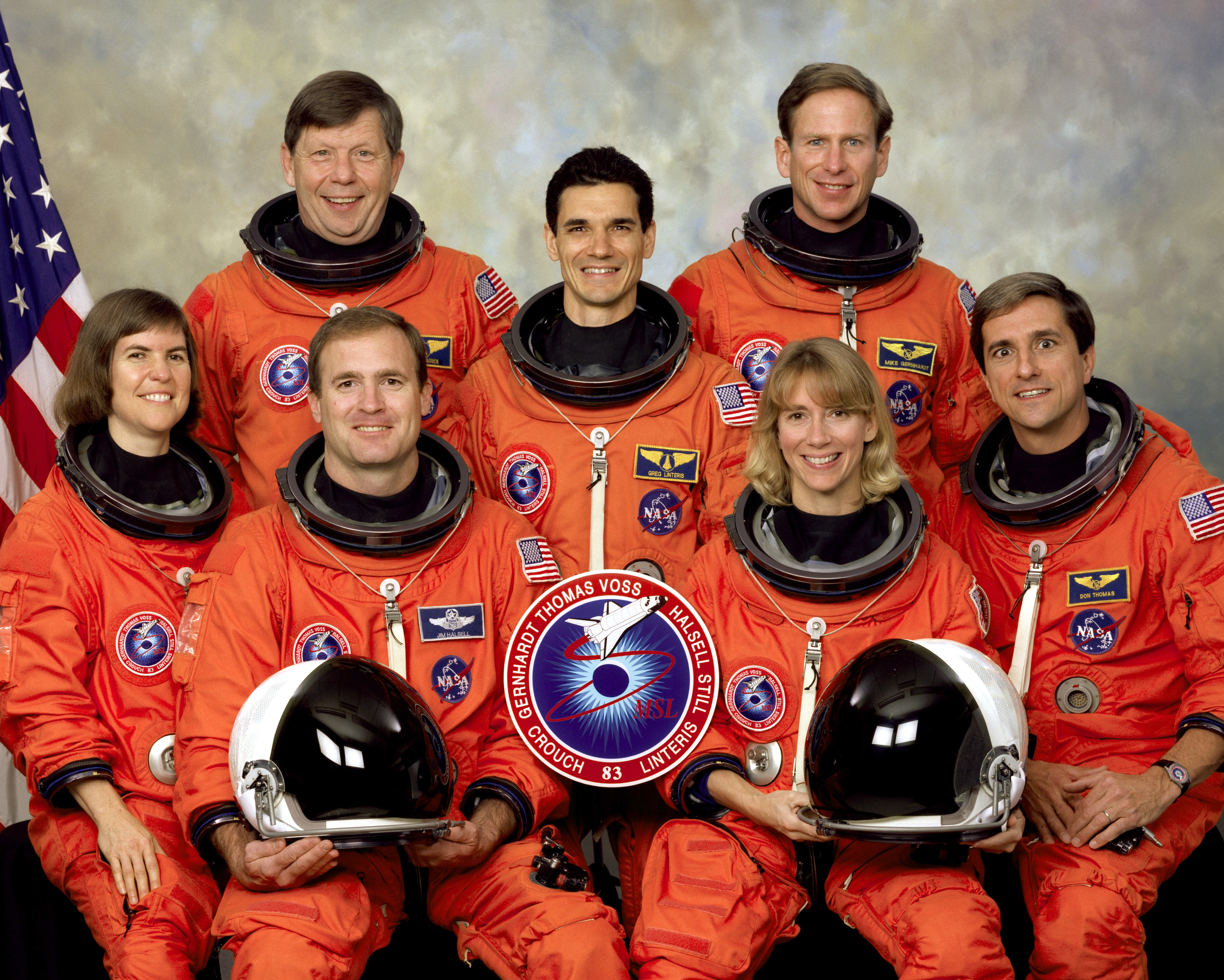
- Back row, from left: Crouch, Linteris and Gernhardt; Front row: Voss, Halsell, Still and Thomas Space Shuttle program

STS-83 was a NASA Space Shuttle mission flown by Columbia. It was a science research mission that achieved orbit successfully, but the planned duration was a failure due to a technical problem with a fuel cell that resulted in the abort of the 15 day duration. Columbia returned to Earth just shy of four days. The mission was re-flown as STS-94 with the same crew later that year.

== Crew ==
| Position | Astronaut |
|---|---|
| Commander | James D. Halsell; Third spaceflight |
| Pilot | Susan L. Still; First spaceflight |
| Mission Specialist 1 | Janice E. Voss; Third spaceflight |
| Mission Specialist 2 Flight Engineer | Michael L. Gernhardt; Second spaceflight |
| Mission Specialist 3 | Donald A. Thomas; Third spaceflight |
| Payload Specialist 1 | Roger K. Crouch; First spaceflight |
| Payload Specialist 2 | Gregory T. Linteris; First spaceflight |

=== Crew seat assignments ===
| Seat | Launch | Landing | Seats 1–4 are on the flight deck. Seats 5–7 are on the mid-deck. |
| 1 | Halsell | | Seats 1–4 are on the flight deck. Seats 5–7 are on the mid-deck. |
| 2 | Still | | Seats 1–4 are on the flight deck. Seats 5–7 are on the mid-deck. |
| 3 | Voss | Gernhardt | Seats 1–4 are on the flight deck. Seats 5–7 are on the mid-deck. |
| 4 | Thomas | | Seats 1–4 are on the flight deck. Seats 5–7 are on the mid-deck. |
| 5 | Gernhardt | Voss | Seats 1–4 are on the flight deck. Seats 5–7 are on the mid-deck. |
| 6 | Crouch | | Seats 1–4 are on the flight deck. Seats 5–7 are on the mid-deck. |
| 7 | Linteris | | Seats 1–4 are on the flight deck. Seats 5–7 are on the mid-deck. |

== Mission highlights ==
| Attempt | Planned | Result | Turnaround | Reason | Decision point | Weather go (%) | Notes |
|---|---|---|---|---|---|---|---|
| 1 | 3 Apr 1997, 2:01:00 pm | Scrubbed | — | Technical | 1 Apr 1997, 8:00 pm | 80 | Technicians needed to add additional thermal insulation to a water coolant line. |
| 2 | 4 Apr 1997, 2:20:32 pm | Success | 1 day 0 hours 20 minutes | | | 90 | T−9 minute hold extended to replace a cabin pressure seal. |

This mission was originally launched on April 4, 1997, and was intended to be on orbit for 15 days, 16 hours. The mission was cut short due to a problem with Fuel Cell #2 and it landed on April 8, after 3 days 23 hours. NASA decided to fly the mission again as STS-94, which launched July 1, 1997.

The primary payload on STS-83 was the Microgravity Science Laboratory (MSL). MSL was a collection of microgravity experiments housed inside a European Spacelab Long Module (LM). It built on the cooperative and scientific foundation of the International Microgravity Laboratory missions (IML-1 on STS-42 and IML-2 on STS-65), the United States Microgravity Laboratory missions (USML-1 on STS-50 and USML-2 on STS-73), the Japanese Spacelab mission (Spacelab-J on STS-47), the Spacelab Life and Microgravity Science Mission (LMS on STS-78) and the German Spacelab missions (D-1 on STS-61-A and D-2 on STS-55).

MSL featured 19 materials science investigations in four major facilities. These facilities were the Large Isothermal Furnace, the EXpedite the Processing of Experiments to the Space Station (EXPRESS) Rack, the Electromagnetic Containerless Processing Facility (TEMPUS) and the Coarsening in Solid–Liquid Mixtures (CSLM) facility, the Droplet Combustion Experiment (DCE) and the Combustion Module-1 Facility. Additional technology experiments were to be performed in the Middeck Glovebox (MGBX) developed by the Marshall Space Flight Center (MSFC) and the High-Packed Digital Television (HI-PAC DTV) system was used to provide multi-channel real-time analog science video.

The Large Isothermal Furnace was developed by the Japanese Space Agency (NASDA) for the STS-47 Spacelab-J mission and was also flown on STS-65 IML-2 mission. It housed the measurement of diffusion coefficient by shear cell method experiment, the diffusion of liquid metals and alloys experiment, the diffusion in liquid lead-tin-telluride experiment, the impurity diffusion in ionic melts experiment, the liquid phase sintering II experiment (LIF), and the diffusion processes in molten semiconductors experiment (DPIMS).

The Combustion Module-1 (CM-1) facility from the NASA Lewis Research Center housed experiments on Laminar Soot Processes Experiment and the Structure of Flame Balls at Low Lewis-number Experiment (SOFBALL).

The Droplet Combustion Experiment (DCE) is designed to investigate the fundamental combustion aspects of single, isolated droplets under different pressures and ambient oxygen concentrations for a range of droplet sizes varying between 2 millimetres (0.079 in) and 5 millimetres (0.20 in). The DCE apparatus is integrated into a single width MSL Spacelab rack in the cargo bay.

The EXPRESS rack replaces a Spacelab Double rack and special hardware will provide the same structural and resource connections the rack will have on the Space Station. It will house the Physics of Hard Spheres (PHaSE) experiment and the Astro/PGBA Experiment.

The Electromagnetic Containerless Processing Facility (TEMPUS) is used for the experiments on nucleation in different flow regimes, thermophysical properties of advanced materials in the undercooled liquid state experiment, measurements of the surface tension of liquid and undercooled metallic alloys by oscillating drop technique experiment, alloy undercooling experiments, the study of the morphological stability of growing dendrites by comparative dendrite velocity measurements on pure ni and dilute Ni–C alloy in the Earth and space laboratory experiment, the undercooled melts of alloys with polytetrahedral short-range order experiment, the thermal expansion of glass forming metallic alloys in the undercooled state experiment, the AC calorimetry and thermophysical properties of bulk glass-forming metallic liquids experiment and the measurement of surface tension and viscosity of undercooled liquid metals experiment.

There were also experiments on measuring microgravity. They included the space acceleration measurement system (SAMS), the microgravity measurement assembly (MMA), the quasi-steady acceleration measurement system and the orbital acceleration research experiment (OARE).

The middeck glovebox (MGBX) facility supported the bubble and drop nonlinear dynamics (BDND) experiment, the study of the fundamental operation of a capillary-driven heat transfer (CHT) device in microgravity experiment, the internal flows in a free drop (IFFD) experiment and the fiber-supported droplet combustion experiment (FSDC-2).

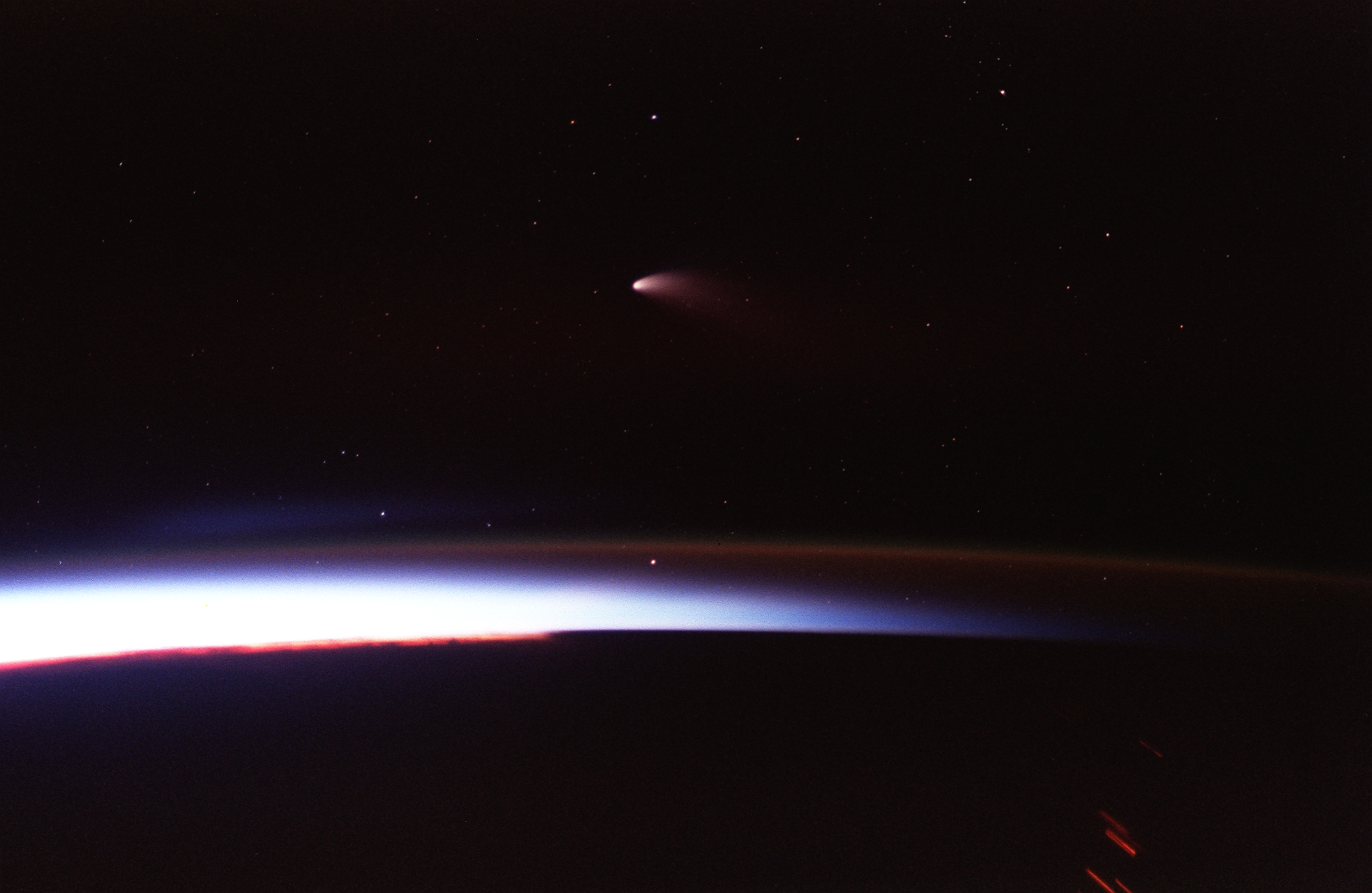
Comet Hale-Bopp as seen from the shuttle

== Reflight ==
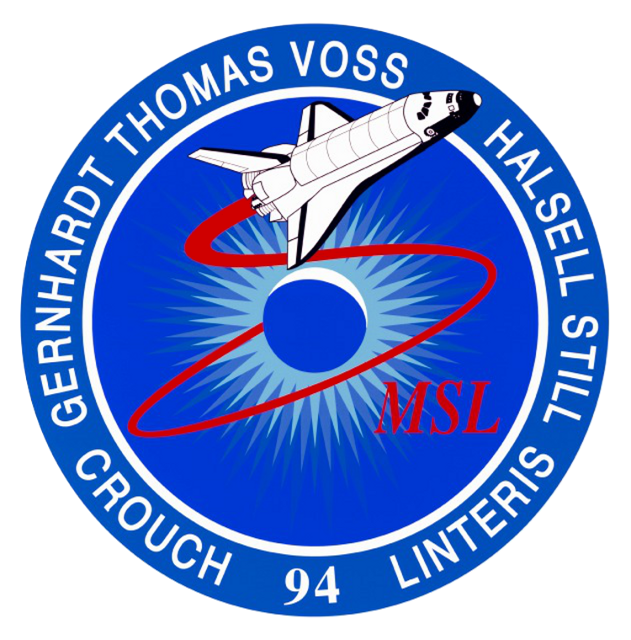
For the reflight, STS-94, only the flight number and the color of the crew patch were changed.

Prior to launch, and continuing through the early part of the mission, flight controllers on the ground were monitoring an anomaly within the electrical power generating Fuel Cell #2 (of three), making it appear that oxygen and hydrogen might be starting to uncontrollably mix, which could lead to detonation (a similar scenario that caused the explosion on Apollo 13). Despite troubleshooting, the anomaly persisted and appeared to worsen. Mission Flight Rules required that the fuel cell be shut down once a certain voltage threshold had been crossed, and with only two of three fuel cells working, that invoked another Flight Rule which required the mission be terminated early (loss of a second fuel cell would require severe and dangerous powerdowns, though the shuttle operates normally on two). Payload Specialist Dr. Linteris described the mission as "an exercise in crisis management. The main bus alarm was going off continually."

Astronaut Chris Hadfield served as CAPCOM for STS-83. He cited NASA's decision to terminate the mission as a positive example of applying the Flight Rules body of knowledge to ensure astronaut safety: "The beauty of Flight Rules is that they create certainty when we have to make tough calls.... In real time, the temptation to take a chance is always higher. However, the flight rules were unequivocal: the Shuttle had to return to Earth."

Upon landing, mission managers decided that Columbia did not need to be processed per a typical end of mission maintenance flow. Instead, they called for an unprecedented reflight of the same mission, once the normal processing could be completed (refill the propellant tanks and other consumables like oxygen, hydrogen, nitrogen, and water, change out the main engines, etc.). The same crew flew the reflight, which was designated STS-94 (the next available unused shuttle mission number at the time), three months later, in July 1997. The crew patch was updated with the reflight, changing the outer border from red to blue and changing the flight number from 83 to 94.

== See also ==
- List of human spaceflights
- List of Space Shuttle missions
- Outline of space science
