= STS-94 =

1997 American crewed spaceflight to conduct space experiments

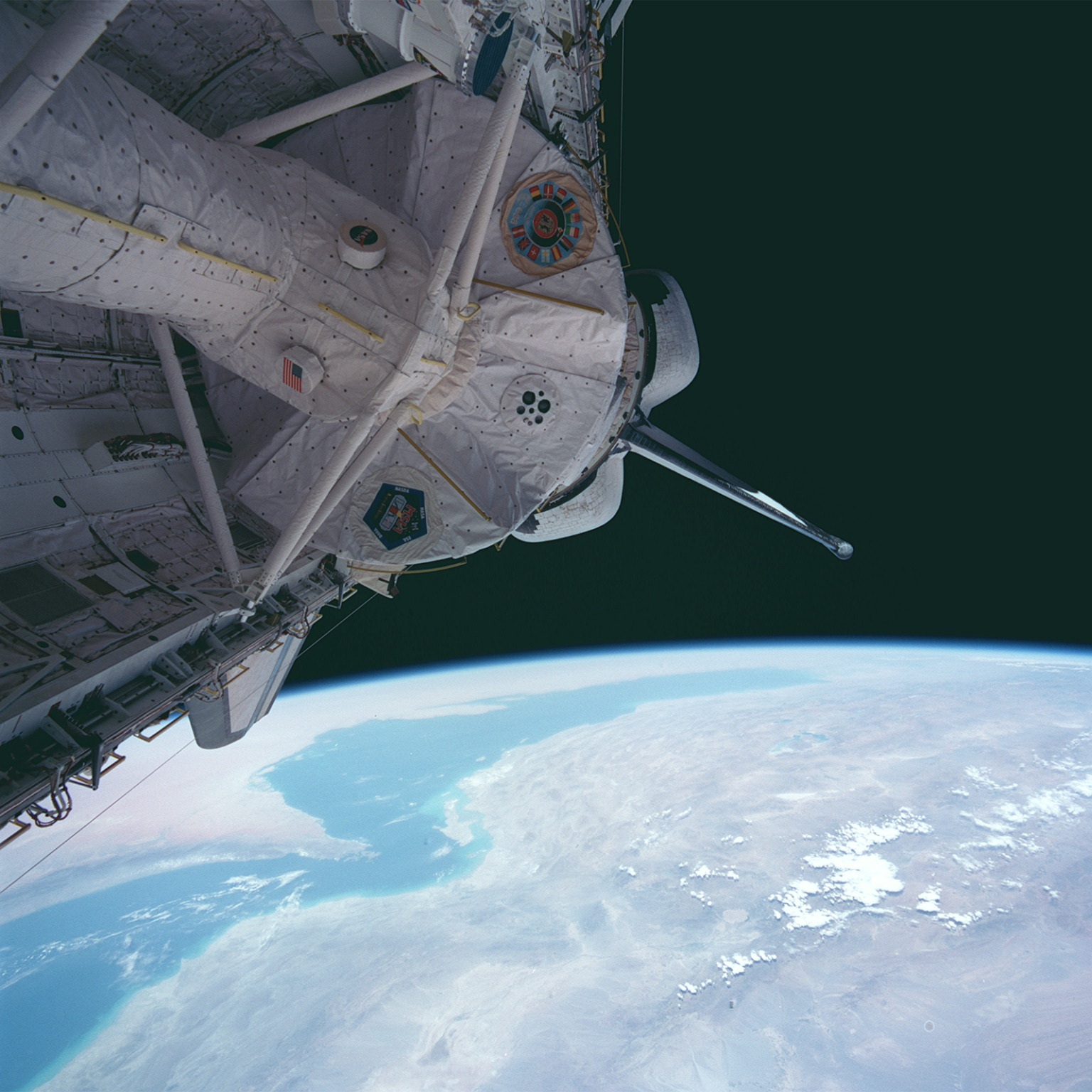
- Spacelab Module LM1 in Columbia's payload bay, serving as the Microgravity Science Laboratory
- Names: Space Transportation System-94
- Mission type: Microgravity research
- Operator: NASA
- COSPAR ID: 1997-032A
- SATCAT no.: 24849
- Mission duration: 15 days, 16 hours, 44 minutes and 34 seconds
- Distance travelled: 10,000,000 km (6,200,000 mi)

Spacecraft properties
- Spacecraft: Space Shuttle Columbia
- Landing mass: 117,802 kg (259,709 lb)
- Payload mass: 10,169 kg (22,419 lb)

Crew
- Crew size: 7
- Members: James D. Halsell; Susan L. Still; Janice E. Voss; Michael L. Gernhardt; Donald A. Thomas; Roger K. Crouch; Gregory T. Linteris

Start of mission
- Launch date: 1 July 1997, 18:02:00 UTC (2:02 pm EDT)
- Launch site: Kennedy, LC-39A

End of mission
- Landing date: 17 July 1997, 10:46:34 UTC (6:46:34 am EDT)
- Landing site: Kennedy, SLF Runway 33

Orbital parameters
- Reference system: Geocentric orbit
- Regime: Low Earth orbit
- Perigee altitude: 296 km (184 mi)
- Apogee altitude: 300 km (190 mi)
- Inclination: 28.45°
- Period: 90.5 minutes
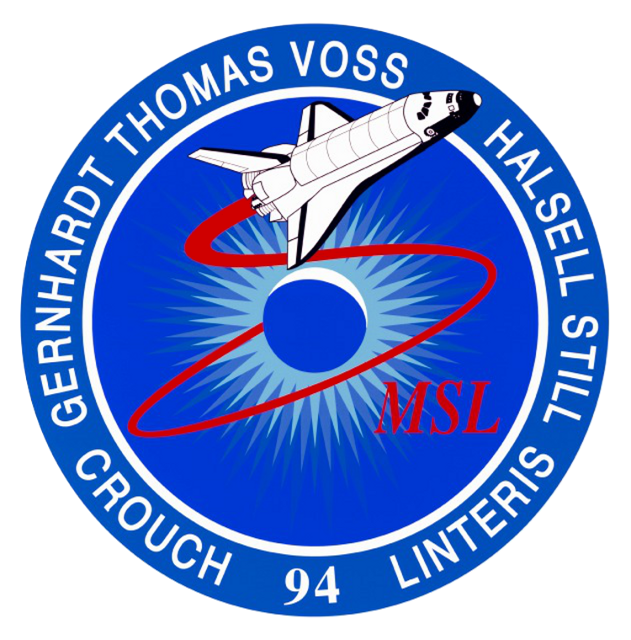
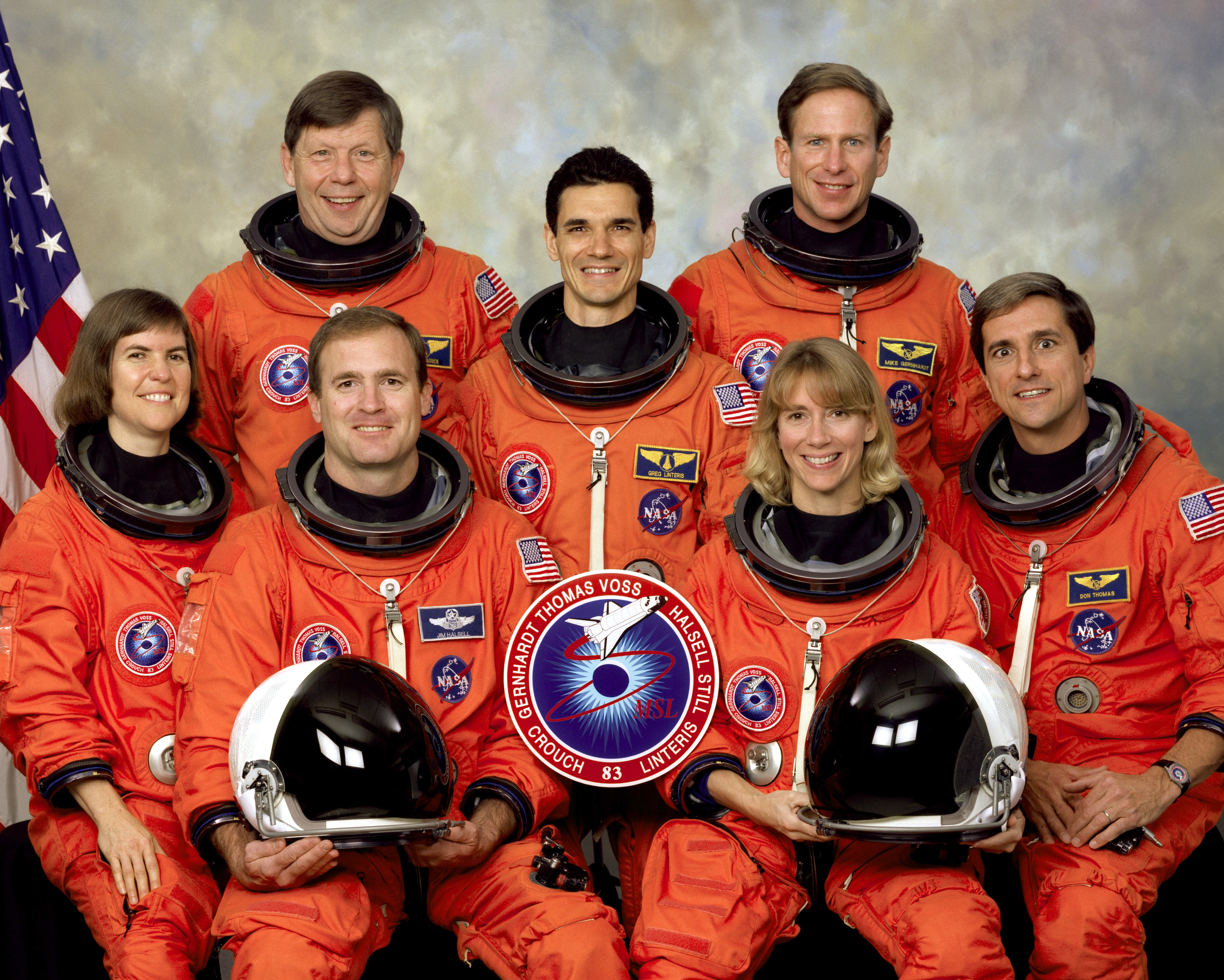
- Back row, from left: Crouch, Linteris and Gernhardt; Front row: Voss, Halsell, Still and Thomas (Note: This image is the crew portrait of the STS-83 mission, which has the same crew composition as this flight) Space Shuttle program

STS-94 was a mission of the United States Space Shuttle Columbia, launched on 1 July 1997.

== Crew ==
Position	Astronaut
Commander	James D. Halsell; Fourth spaceflight
Pilot	Susan L. Still; Second and last spaceflight
Mission Specialist 1	Janice E. Voss; Fourth spaceflight
Mission Specialist 2 Flight Engineer	Michael L. Gernhardt; Third spaceflight
Mission Specialist 3	Donald A. Thomas; Fourth and last spaceflight
Payload Specialist 1	Roger K. Crouch; Second and last spaceflight
Payload Specialist 2	Gregory T. Linteris; Second and last spaceflight

STS-94 was flown by the same crew that flew STS-83, the only time in the history of human spaceflight that two missions with more than one crewmember had exactly the same crew.

=== Crew seat assignments ===
Seat	Launch	Landing	Seats 1–4 are on the flight deck. Seats 5–7 are on the mid-deck.
1	Halsell		Seats 1–4 are on the flight deck. Seats 5–7 are on the mid-deck.
2	Still		Seats 1–4 are on the flight deck. Seats 5–7 are on the mid-deck.
3	Voss	Gernhardt	Seats 1–4 are on the flight deck. Seats 5–7 are on the mid-deck.
4	Thomas		Seats 1–4 are on the flight deck. Seats 5–7 are on the mid-deck.
5	Gernhardt	Voss	Seats 1–4 are on the flight deck. Seats 5–7 are on the mid-deck.
6	Crouch		Seats 1–4 are on the flight deck. Seats 5–7 are on the mid-deck.
7	Linteris		Seats 1–4 are on the flight deck. Seats 5–7 are on the mid-deck.

== Mission highlights ==
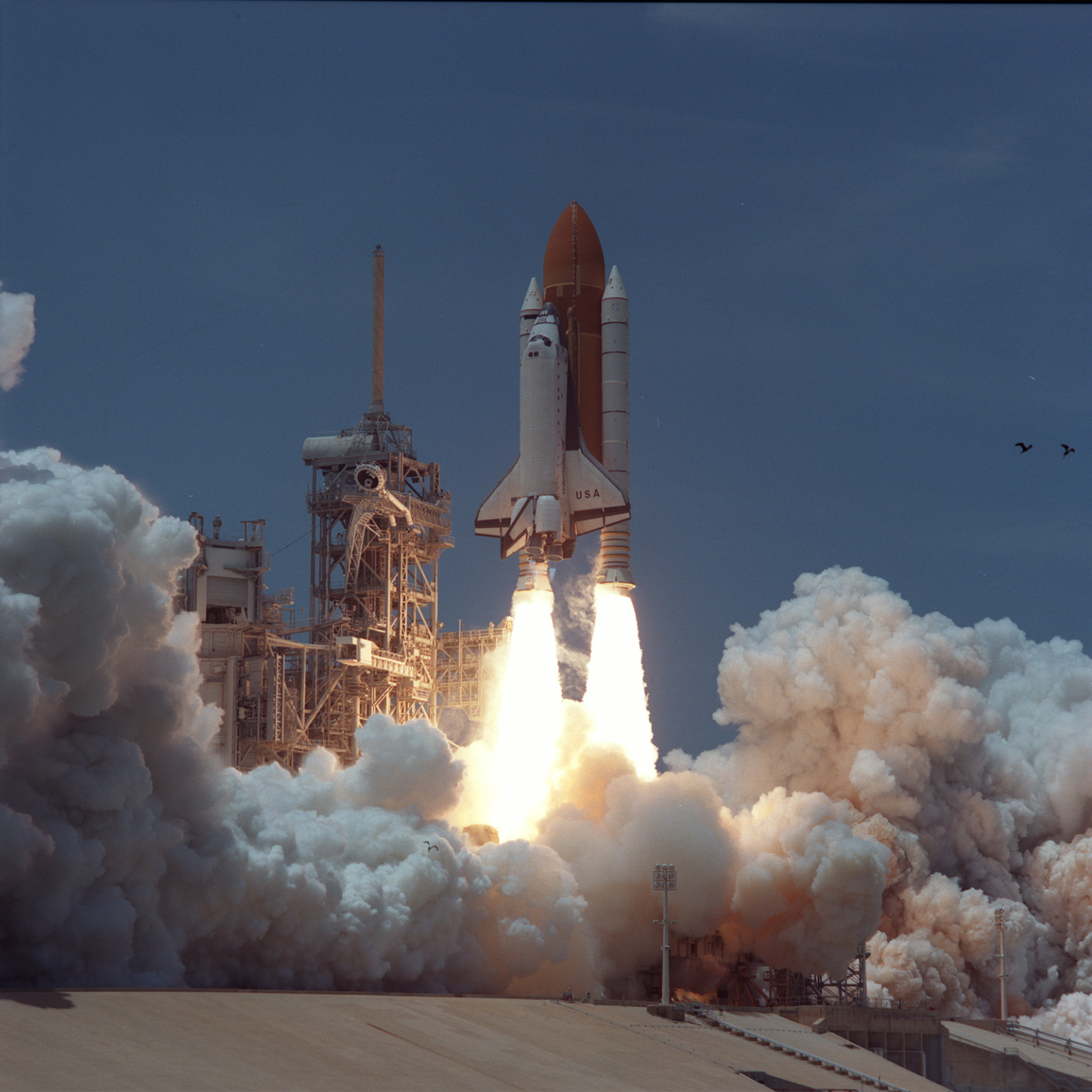
Launch of STS-94

This was a reflight of the STS-83 Microgravity Science Laboratory (MSL) mission. MSL was originally launched on 4 April 1997 at 2:20 pm EST and was intended to be on orbit for 15 days, 16 hours. The mission was cut short due to a problem with Fuel Cell #2 and Columbia landed on 8 April 1997 after 3 days 23 hours.

The primary payload on STS-83 was the Microgravity Science Laboratory (MSL). MSL was a collection of microgravity experiments housed inside a European Spacelab Long Module (LM). It built on the cooperative and scientific foundation of the International Microgravity Laboratory missions (IML-1 on STS-42 and IML-2 on STS-65), the United States Microgravity Laboratory missions (USML-1 on STS-50 and USML-2 on STS-73), the Japanese Spacelab mission (Spacelab-J on STS-47), the Spacelab Life and Microgravity Science Mission (LMS on STS-78) and the German Spacelab missions (D-1 on STS-61-A and D-2 on STS-55).

MSL featured 19 materials science investigations in 4 major facilities. These facilities were the Large Isothermal Furnace, the EXpedite the PRocessing of Experiments to the Space Station (EXPRESS) Rack, the Electromagnetic Containerless Processing Facility (TEMPUS) and the Coarsening in Solid-Liquid Mixtures (CSLM) facility, the Droplet Combustion Experiment (DCE) and the Combustion Module-1 Facility. Additional technology experiments were to be performed in the Middeck Glovebox (MGBX) developed by the Marshall Space Flight Center (MSFC) and the High-Packed Digital Television (HI-PAC DTV) system was used to provide multi-channel real-time analog science video.

The Large Isothermal Furnace was developed by the Japanese Space Agency (NASDA) for the STS-47 Spacelab-J mission and was also flown on STS-65 IML-2 mission. It housed the Measurement of Diffusion Coefficient by Shear Cell Method Experiment, the Diffusion of Liquid Metals and Alloys Experiment, the Diffusion in Liquid Led-Tin-Telluride Experiment, the Impurity Diffusion in Ionic Melts Experiment, the Liquid Phase Sintering II Experiment (LIF), and the Diffusion Processes in Molten Semiconductors Experiment (DPIMS).

The Combustion Module-1 (CM-1) facility from the NASA Lewis Research Center housed experiments on Laminar Soot Processes Experiment and the Structure of Flame Balls at Low Lewis-number Experiment (SOFBALL).

The Droplet Combustion Experiment (DCE) is designed to investigate the fundamental combustion aspects of single, isolated droplets under different pressures and ambient oxygen concentrations for a range of droplet sizes varying between 2 millimetres (0.079 in) and 5 millimetres (0.20 in). The DCE apparatus is integrated into a single width MSL Spacelab rack in the cargo bay.

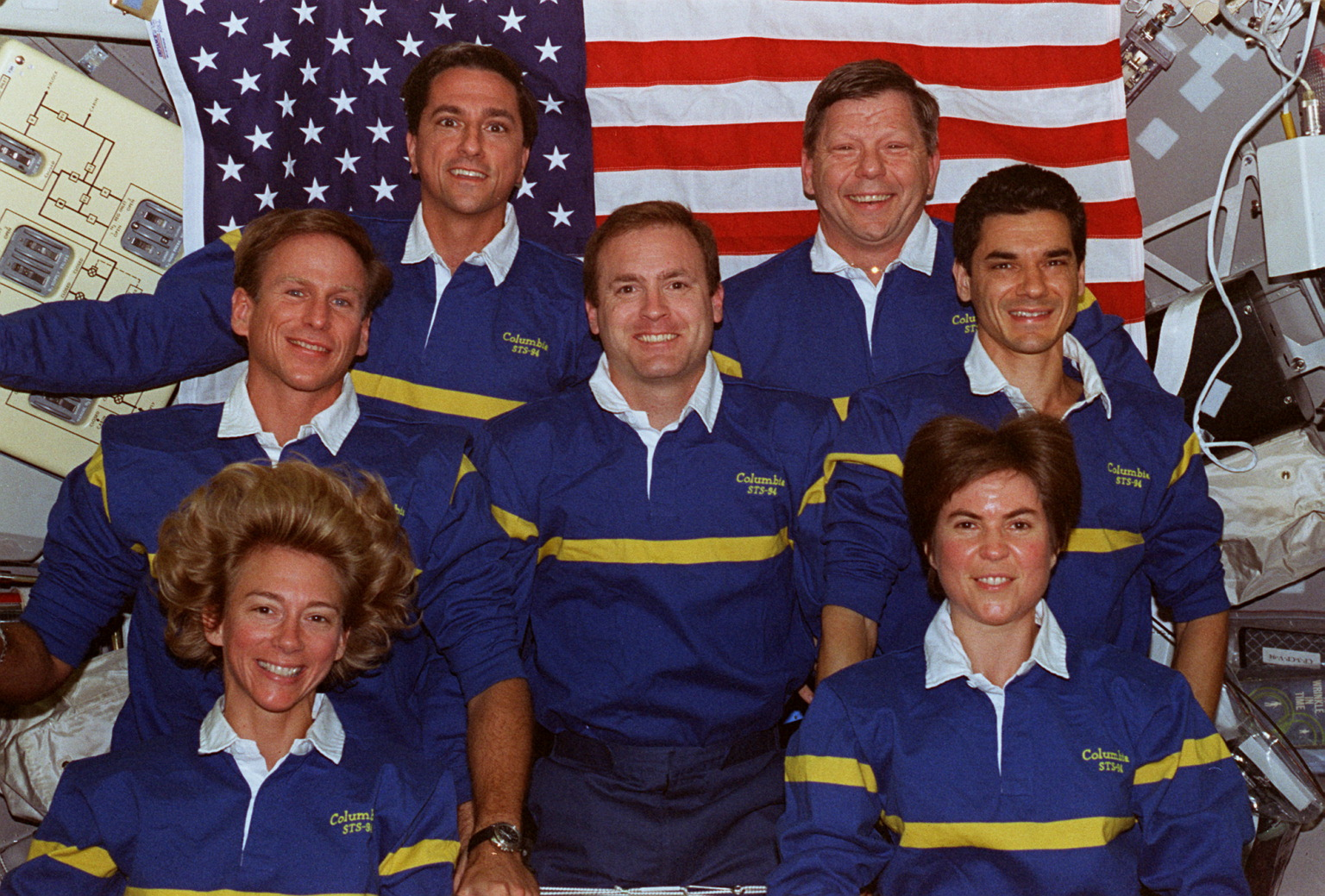
STS-94 crew on orbit

The EXPRESS rack replaces a Spacelab Double rack and special hardware will provide the same structural and resource connections the rack will have on the Space Station. It will house the Physics of Hard Spheres (PHaSE) experiment and the Astro/PGBA Experiment.

The Electromagnetic Containerless Processing Facility (TEMPUS) is used for the Experiments on Nucleation in Different Flow Regimes, Thermophysical Properties of Advanced Materials in the Undercooled Liquid State Experiment, Measurements of the Surface Tension of Liquid and Undercooled Metallic Alloys by Oscillating Drop Technique Experiment, Alloy Undercooling Experiments, the Study of the Morphological Stability of Growing Dendrites by Comparative Dendrite Velocity Measurements on Pure Ni and Dilute Ni–C Alloy in the Earth and Space Laboratory Experiment, the Undercooled Melts of Alloys with Polytetrahedral Short-Range Order Experiment, the Thermal Expansion of Glass Forming Metallic Alloys in the Undercooled State Experiment, the AC Calorimetry and Thermophysical Properties of Bulk Glass-Forming Metallic Liquids experiment and the Measurement of Surface Tension and Viscosity of Undercooled Liquid Metals experiment.

There were also experiments on measuring microgravity. They included the Space Acceleration Measurement System (SAMS), the Microgravity Measurement Assembly (MMA), the Quasi-Steady Acceleration Measurement System and the Orbital Acceleration Research Experiment (OARE).

The Middeck Glovebox (MGBX) facility supported the Bubble and Drop Nonlinear Dynamics (BDND) Experiment, the Study of the Fundamental Operation of a Capillary-driven Heat Transfer (CHT) Device in Microgravity Experiment, the Internal Flows in a Free Drop (IFFD) experiment and the Fiber Supported Droplet Combustion experiment (FSDC-2).

== See also ==
- List of human spaceflights
- List of Space Shuttle missions
- Outline of space science
