= Gregory T. Linteris =

American astronaut and scientist (born 1957)

Gregory Thomas Linteris
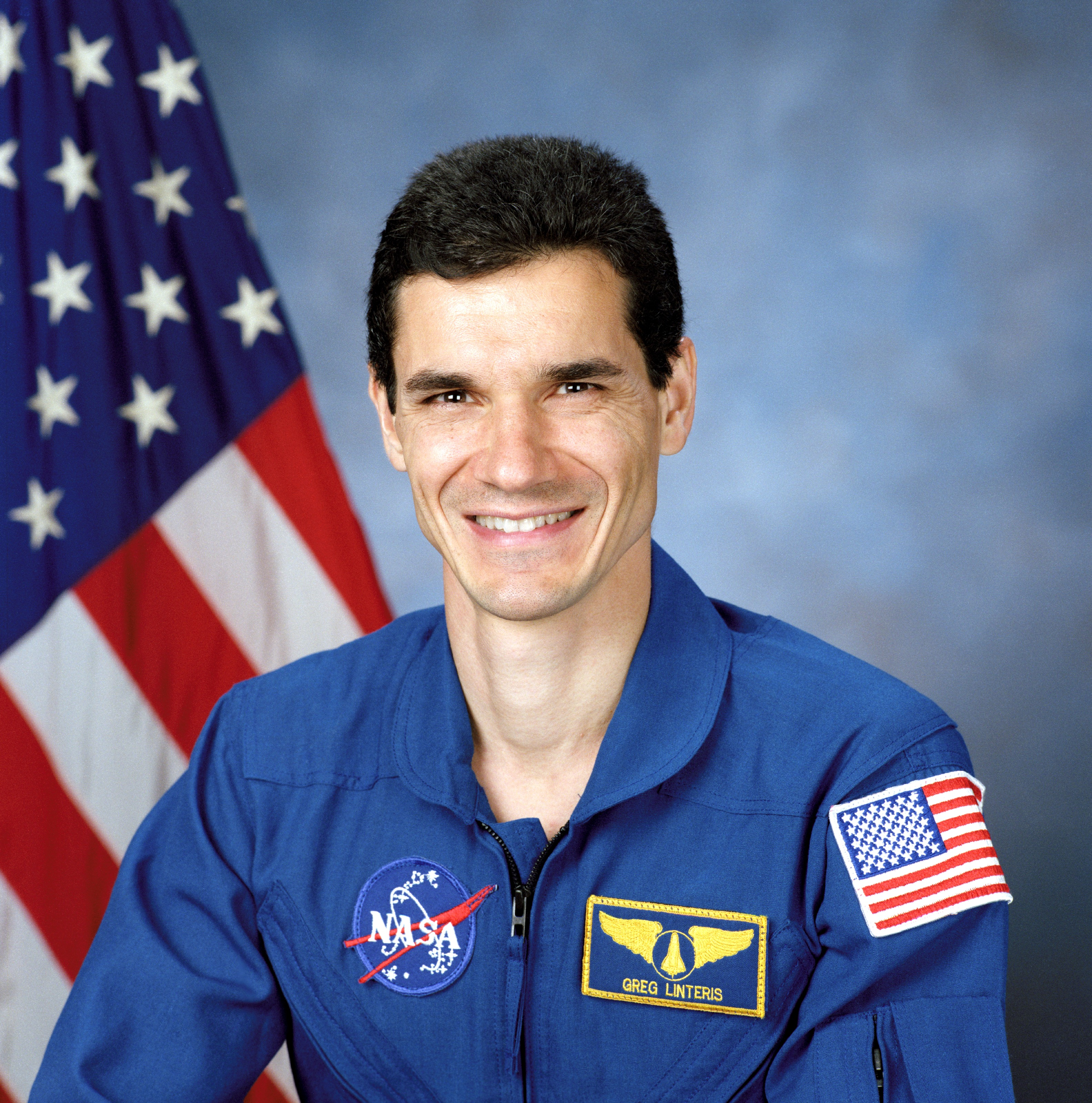
- Linteris in 1996
- Born: October 4, 1957 (age 69); Demarest, New Jersey
- Occupation: Scientist
- Space career

NIST Payload Specialist
- Time in space: 19d 15h 58m
- Missions: STS-83, STS-94

Gregory Thomas Linteris (born October 4, 1957) is an American scientist who flew as a payload specialist on two NASA Space Shuttle missions in 1997.

== Education ==
Linteris grew up in Demarest, New Jersey, where he attended Northern Valley Regional High School at Demarest. He received a bachelor of science degree in chemical engineering from Princeton University in 1979 and a master of science degree from the design division of the mechanical engineering department at Stanford University in 1984; he was awarded a doctorate in mechanical and aerospace engineering from Princeton in 1990 after completing a doctoral dissertation titled "Trace radical species detection in a turbulent chemical kinetic flow reactor using a 180⁰ laser induced fluorescence probe" supervised by Fred Dryer. Linteris is a member of the American Institute of Aeronautics and Astronautics, the American Physical Society, the Combustion Institute and Sigma Xi He has over 100 publications in the areas of combustion, chemical kinetics, spectroscopy, and heat transfer.

== Spaceflight experience ==
Linteris was a payload specialist on STS-83 (April 4–8, 1997) and STS-94 (July 1–17, 1997) and logged over 471 hours in space. STS-83, the Microgravity Science Laboratory (MSL-1) Spacelab mission, was cut short because of problems with one of the Space Shuttle's three fuel cell power generation units. STS-94 was a re-flight of the Microgravity Science Laboratory (MSL-1) Spacelab mission, and focused on materials and combustion science research in microgravity.

== Current position ==
During his spaceflight time and currently, Linteris is a staff scientist in the Building Energy and Environment Division of the Engineering Laboratory at the National Institute of Standards and Technology in Gaithersburg, Maryland.
