= STS-42 =

1992 American crewed spaceflight

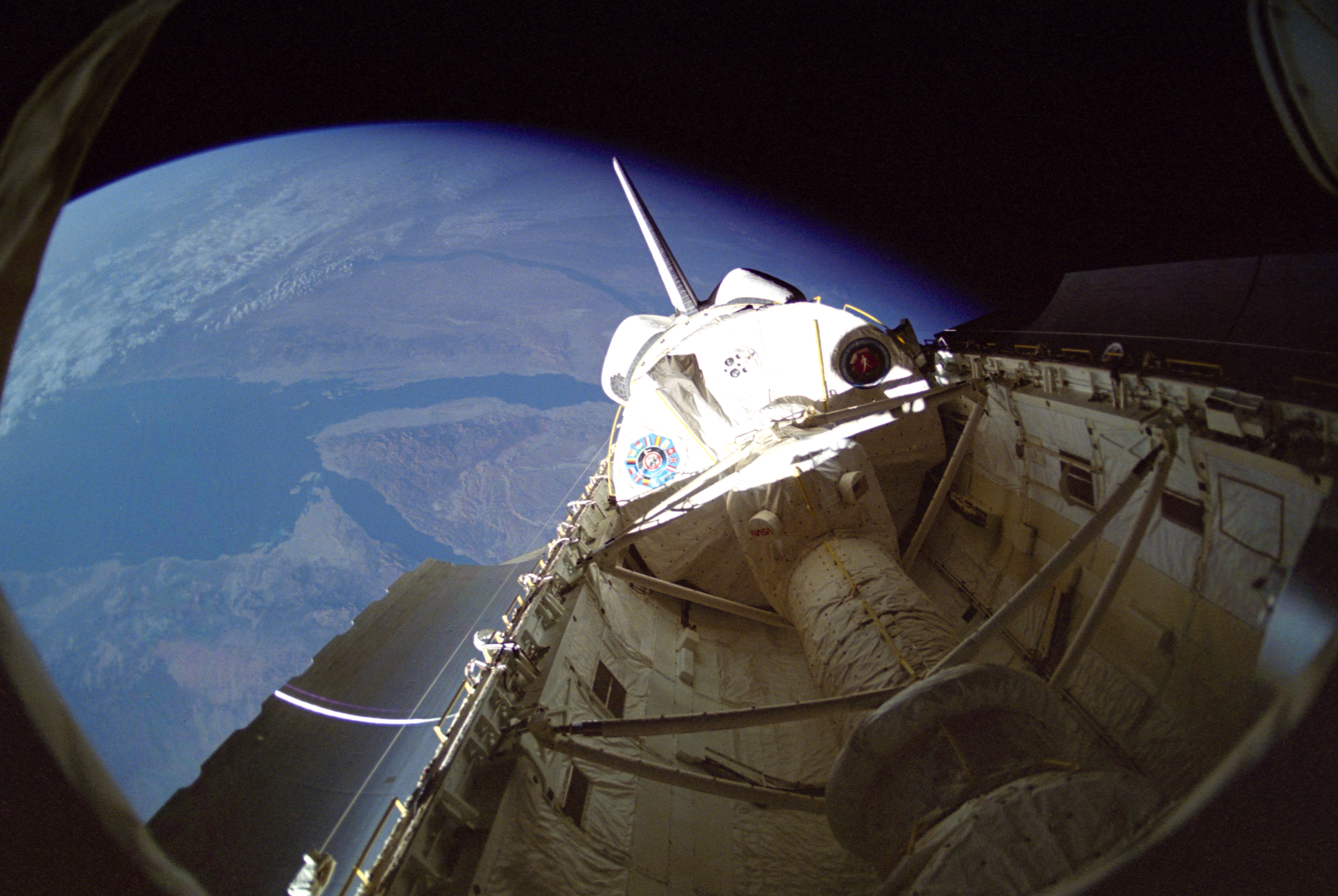
- Spacelab Module LM2 in Discovery's payload bay, serving as the International Microgravity Laboratory (IML).
- Names: Space Transportation System-42
- Mission type: International Microgravity Laboratory-1
- Operator: NASA
- COSPAR ID: 1992-002A
- SATCAT no.: 21846
- Mission duration: 8 days, 1 hour, 14 minutes, 44 seconds
- Distance travelled: 4,701,140 km (2,921,150 mi)
- Orbits completed: 129

Spacecraft properties
- Spacecraft: Space Shuttle Discovery
- Launch mass: 110,400 kg (243,400 lb)
- Landing mass: 98,924 kg (218,090 lb)
- Payload mass: 13,066 kg (28,806 lb)

Crew
- Crew size: 7
- Members: Ronald J. Grabe; Stephen S. Oswald; Norman Thagard; William F. Readdy; David C. Hilmers; Roberta Bondar; Ulf Merbold

Start of mission
- Launch date: January 22, 1992, 14:52:33 UTC (9:52:33 am EDT)
- Launch site: Kennedy, LC-39A
- Contractor: Rockwell International

End of mission
- Landing date: January 30, 1992, 16:07:17 UTC (8:07:17 am PDT)
- Landing site: Edwards, Runway 22

Orbital parameters
- Reference system: Geocentric orbit
- Regime: Low Earth orbit
- Perigee altitude: 291 km (181 mi)
- Apogee altitude: 307 km (191 mi)
- Inclination: 57.00°
- Period: 90.50 minutes
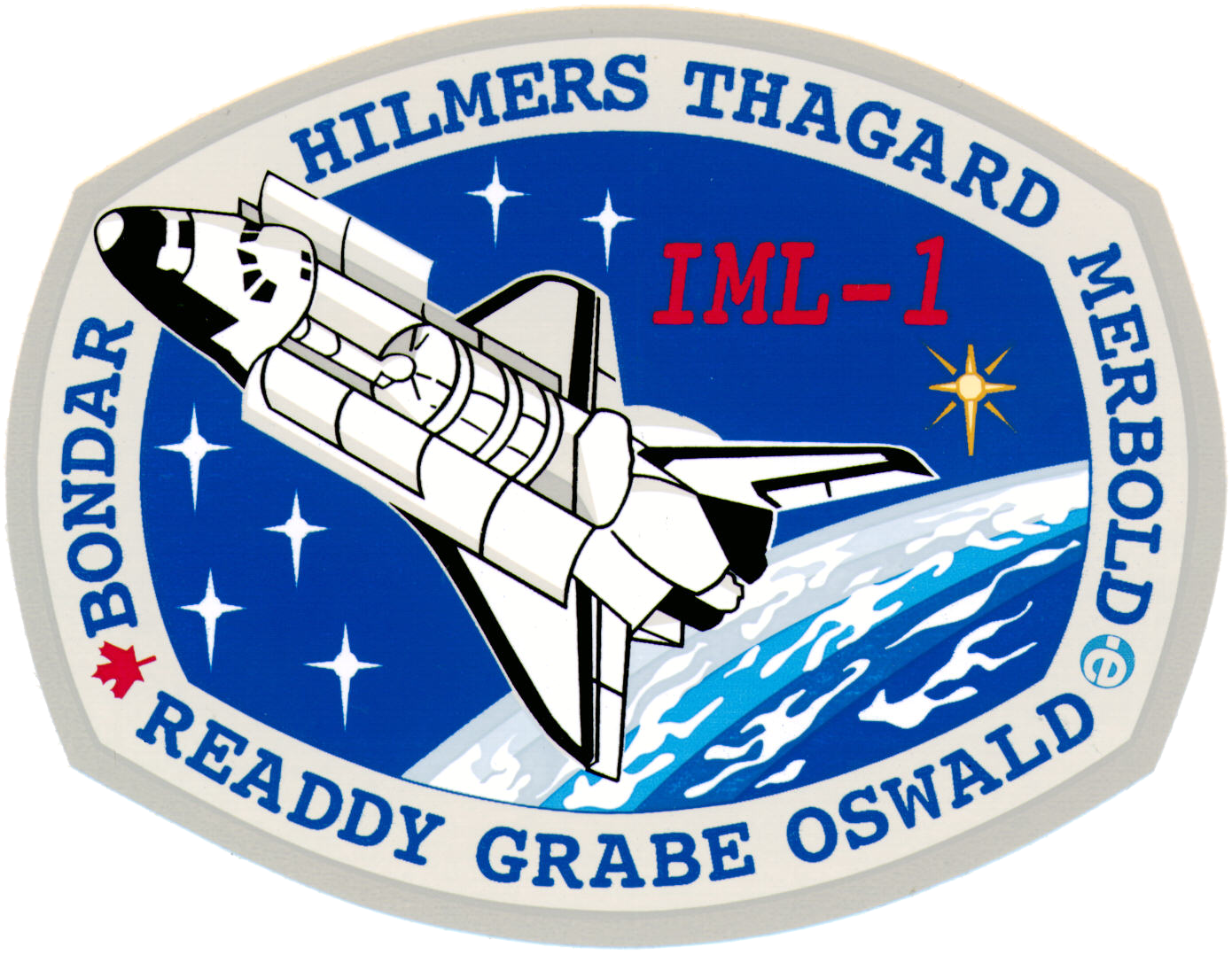
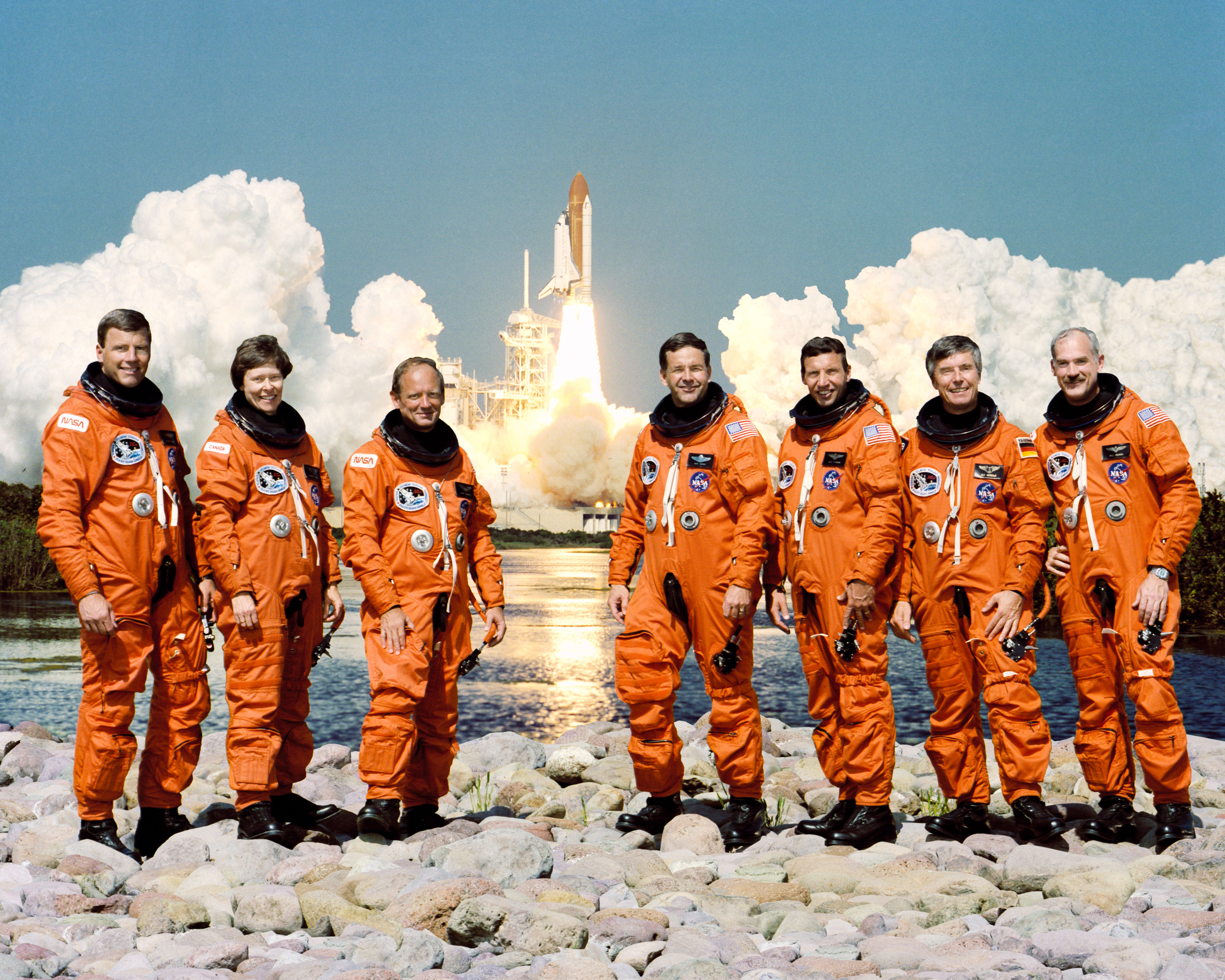
- STS-42 mission patch From left: Oswald, Bondar, Thagard, Grabe, Hilmers, Merbold and Readdy Space Shuttle program

STS-42 was a NASA Space Shuttle Discovery mission with the Spacelab module. Liftoff was originally scheduled for 8:45 EST (13:45 UTC) on January 22, 1992, but the launch was delayed due to weather constraints. Discovery successfully lifted off an hour later at 9:52:33 EST (14:52:33 UTC) on her 14th flight. The main goal of the mission was to study the effects of microgravity on a variety of organisms. The shuttle landed at 8:07:17 PST (16:07:17 UTC) on January 30, 1992, on Runway 22, Edwards Air Force Base, California. STS-42 was the first of two flights in 1992 of Discovery, the second of which occurred during STS-53, which launched on December 2, 1992. The mission was also the last mission of the Space Shuttle Discovery to have a seven-member crew until STS-82, which was launched on February 11, 1997.

== Crew ==
Position	Astronaut
Commander	(United States) Ronald J. Grabe; Third spaceflight
Pilot	(United States) Stephen S. Oswald; First spaceflight
Mission Specialist 1	(United States) Norman Thagard; Fourth spaceflight
Mission Specialist 2 Flight Engineer	(United States) William F. Readdy; First spaceflight
Mission Specialist 3	(United States) David C. Hilmers; Fourth and last spaceflight
Payload Specialist 1	(Canada) Roberta Bondar, CSA; Only spaceflight
Payload Specialist 2	(Germany) Ulf Merbold, ESA; Second spaceflight
Member of Blue Team; Member of Red Team

The astronauts were divided into a red team and a blue team to allow around-the-clock monitoring of experiments.

The crew of STS-42 included the first non-American astronauts on a shuttle mission since the Challenger disaster, Ulf D. Merbold and Roberta Bondar. Merbold was West Germany first astronaut and was making his second flight on the shuttle. Bondar was Canada's first female astronaut.

Mary L. Cleave was originally selected to fly as Mission Specialist 3 for this mission but withdrew herself for personal reasons. She was replaced by Manley Lanier "Sonny" Carter Jr., who died seven months prior to the launch in a plane crash. David Hilmers was then chosen to replace him.

=== Backup crew ===
Position	Astronaut
Payload Specialist 1	(Canada) Ken Money, CSA; Would have been first spaceflight
Payload Specialist 2	(United States) Roger Crouch; Would have been first spaceflight
Crouch eventually flew on STS-83 and STS-94, both in 1997.

=== Crew seat assignments ===
Seat	Launch	Landing	Seats 1–4 are on the flight deck. Seats 5–7 are on the mid-deck.
1	Grabe		Seats 1–4 are on the flight deck. Seats 5–7 are on the mid-deck.
2	Oswald		Seats 1–4 are on the flight deck. Seats 5–7 are on the mid-deck.
3	Thagard	Hilmers	Seats 1–4 are on the flight deck. Seats 5–7 are on the mid-deck.
4	Readdy		Seats 1–4 are on the flight deck. Seats 5–7 are on the mid-deck.
5	Hilmers	Thagard	Seats 1–4 are on the flight deck. Seats 5–7 are on the mid-deck.
6	Bondar		Seats 1–4 are on the flight deck. Seats 5–7 are on the mid-deck.
7	Merbold		Seats 1–4 are on the flight deck. Seats 5–7 are on the mid-deck.

== Mission highlights ==
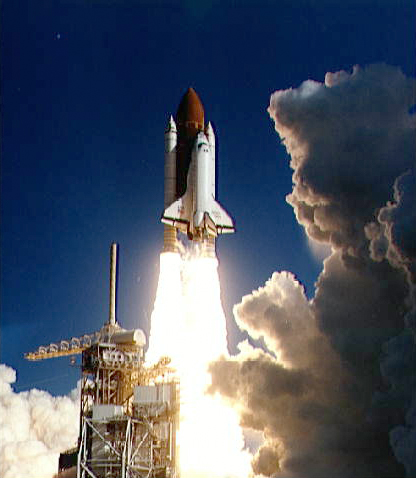
Discovery lifts off at the start of STS-42.

STS-42 was launched on January 22, 1992, 9:52:33 a.m. EST. The launch was delayed by one hour due to weather constraints. The launch weight was 243,396 lb (110,403 kg).

Discovery carried into orbit the International Microgravity Laboratory-1 (IML-1), a pressurized crewed Spacelab module, to explore in depth the complex effects of weightlessness on living organisms and materials processing. The international crew, divided into Red and Blue teams, conducted experiments on the human nervous system's adaptation to low gravity and the effects of microgravity on other life forms such as shrimp eggs, lentil seedlings, fruit fly eggs and bacteria. Low gravity materials processing experiments included crystal growth from a variety of substances such as enzymes, mercury, iodine and a virus. Other payloads included 10 Get Away Special (GAS) canisters, a number of middeck payloads, two Shuttle Student Involvement Program (SSIP) experiments, and an Australian developed ultraviolet telescope Endeavour. Middeck payloads included Gelation of SOLS: Applied Microgravity Research (GOSAMR), Investigations into Polymer Membrane Processing (IPMP) and the Radiation Monitoring Experiment (RME-III).

The mission landed on January 30, 1992, 8:07:17 a.m. PST, Runway 22, Edwards Air Force Base, California, after being extended by a day for continued scientific experimentation. The rollout distance was 9,811 ft (2,990 m). The orbiter returned to Kennedy Space Center on February 16, 1992. The landing weight was 218,016 lb (98,890 kg).

== Mission insignia ==
The four stars in the lower blue field and two stars in the upper blue field of the insignia symbolize the flight's numerical designation in the Space Transportation System's mission sequence. The single gold star above the horizon on the right is in honor of astronaut Manley Lanier "Sonny" Carter Jr., who was killed in the crash of Atlantic Southeast Airlines Flight 2311 in Brunswick, Georgia while on a commercial airplane traveling for NASA. Carter was originally assigned as a mission specialist on STS-42 at the time of his death.

== See also ==
- List of human spaceflights
- List of Space Shuttle missions
- Destiny in Space, 1994 documentary primarily focused on STS-42
- Nikon NASA F4
- Outline of space science
- Space Shuttle
