= Susan Kilrain =

American engineer, military officer and astronaut (born 1961)

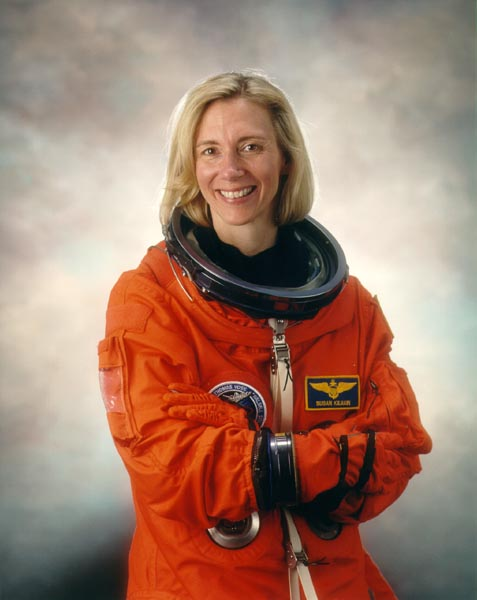
- Kilrain in 2000
- Born: Susan Leigh Still; October 24, 1961 (age 64); Augusta, Georgia, U.S.
- Education: Embry-Riddle Aeronautical University (BS); Georgia Institute of Technology (MS)
- Space career

NASA astronaut
- Rank: Commander, USN
- Time in space: 19d 15h 58m
- Selection: NASA Group 15 (1994)
- Missions: STS-83; STS-94

Susan Kilrain (born Susan Leigh Still, October 24, 1961) is an American aerospace engineer, United States Navy officer and retired NASA astronaut. She is the youngest person to pilot a Space Shuttle. She has flown more than 3,000 hours and among her merits she was awarded with the Defense Superior Service Medal.

== Biography ==
Kilrain was born on October 24, 1961, in Augusta, Georgia. She is the only sister among nine siblings. During her childhood she expressed her interest in becoming an astronaut and her family supported her dream. She started flying in high school where she had a month off during her senior year and completed training to become a private pilot.

Kilrain graduated from the Walnut Hill School, Natick, Massachusetts, in 1979. In 1982, she obtained a bachelor's degree in aeronautical engineering from Embry-Riddle Aeronautical University. She received her master of science degree in aerospace engineering from Georgia Institute of Technology in 1985. During her time in graduate school she worked as a Wind Tunnel Project Officer for Lockheed Corporation.

In January 1985, she had the chance to speak with Dick Scobee, who one year later died as commander of the Challenger STS-51-L. Scobee advised that she should join the military as a pilot if she wanted to increase her chances of being accepted into the astronaut program. In 1985, she joined the US Navy. She quickly realized that the Navy was not an organization that was friendly to women and that it was reluctant to accept her. She was quoted as saying:

I realized that I was a woman in a man's world, so I was going to be an outsider. My whole philosophy was not to make waves. My goal was to be an astronaut. I wanted to fit in without accepting unacceptable behavior.

Susan served as the Legislative Specialist for Shuttle for the Office of Legislative Affairs at NASA Headquarters in Washington D.C. She retired from the Astronaut Office in December 2002 and from the US Navy later in 2005.

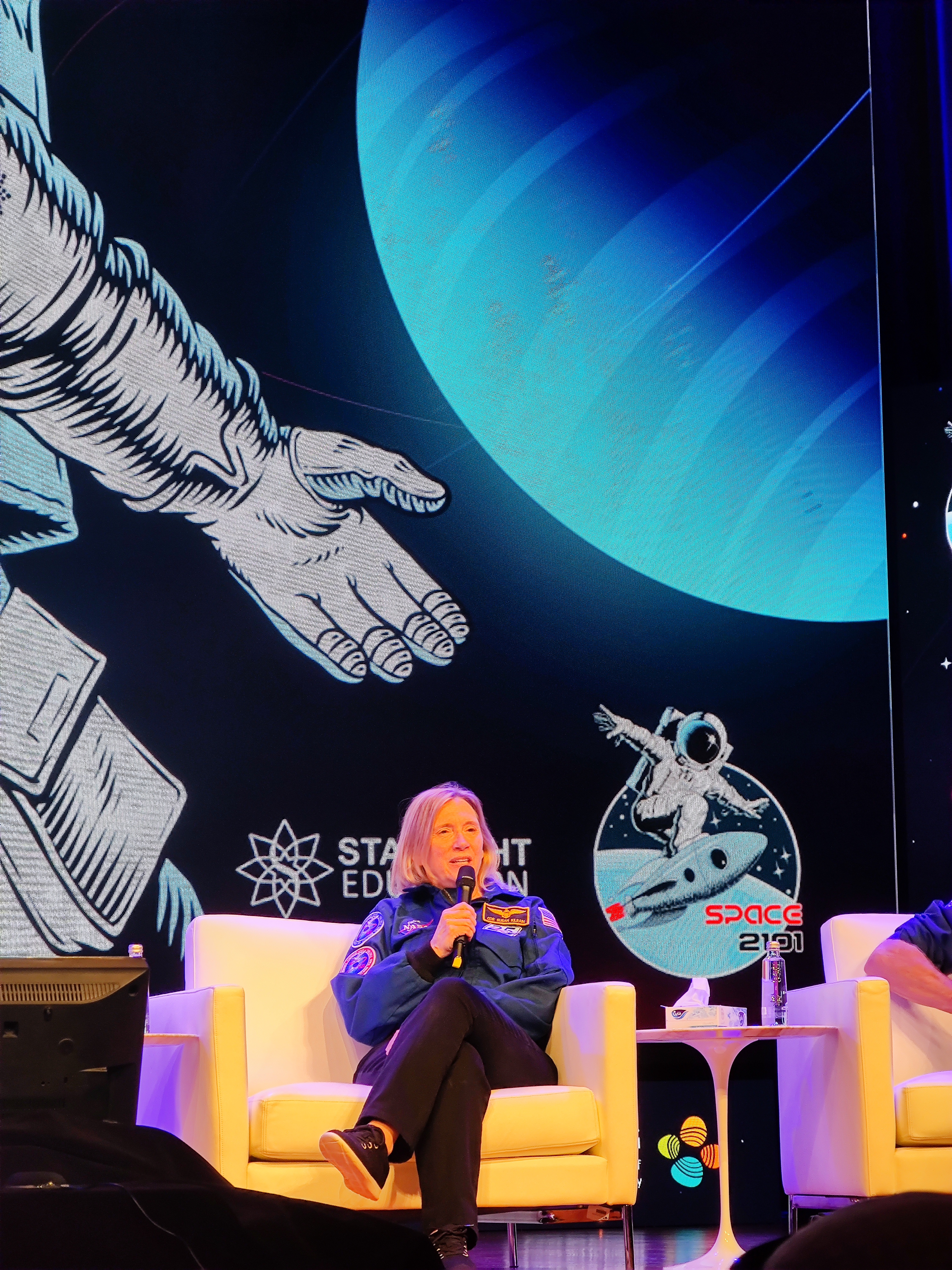
Commander Susan Still Kilrain during her visit to King Abdullah University of Science and Technology as part of the space camp Space 2101.

Since her retirement she works as a motivational speaker. She has participated in the space camp named Space 2101 in 2022 at the Dubai International Academy (DIA) Al Barsha, and in 2023 at King Abdullah University of Science and Technology. During the space camp in Dubai 2,299 students representing 108 nationalities, from five schools achieved a Guinness Book of World Record for the world's largest space exploration lesson across multiple venues.

=== Personal life ===
She is married to Vice Admiral Colin J. Kilrain. The couple have four children and reside in Virginia Beach, Virginia. She loves photography and traveling, as well as martial arts, triathlon and playing the piano.

With the space historian Francis French, Kilrain co-authored a children's book named An Unlikely Astronaut.

== Military career ==
Kilrain was commissioned into the US Navy in 1985. In 1987, she was designated a Naval Aviator. She was selected to be a flight instructor in the TA-4J Skyhawk. Later she flew EA-6A Electric Intruders for Tactical Electronic Warfare Squadron 33 (VAQ-33) in Key West, Florida. Upon completing the US Naval Test Pilot School at NAS Patuxent River, Maryland, she reported to Fighter Squadron 101 (VF-101) in Virginia Beach, Virginia, for F-14 Tomcat training. Throughout her career, has logged over 3,000 flight hours in more than 30 different aircraft.

== NASA career ==
In 1995, she was selected by NASA as part of the 15th Astronaut Training Group. The group was selected to provide pilots, engineers, and astronauts for space shuttle flights. After a year of training, she worked on technical issues for the Vehicle Systems and Operations Branch of the Astronaut Office. She also served as spacecraft communicator (CAPCOM) in mission control during launch and entry for numerous missions.

In 1997, she flew to space twice as a shuttle pilot on the missions STS-83 (April 4 to 8, 1997) and STS-94 (July 1 to 17, 1997). The STS-83 mission delivered to space a Microgravity Science Laboratory (MSL-1), a collection of 33 microgravity experiments housed inside the Spacelab. The goal of this mission was to test hardware, facilities, and procedures being developed in views of the long term research program on the future International Space Station. The mission, which was supposed to last 16 days was cut short because of problems with one of the Shuttle's three fuel cell power generation units. Mission duration was 95 hours and 12 minutes, traveling 1.5 million miles in 63 orbits of the Earth. In July 1997 the STS-83 mission was renamed as STS-94 and represented a re-flight of the MSL-1 Spacelab mission. This mission focused on materials and combustion science research in microgravity. Mission duration was 376 hours and 45 minutes, traveling 6.3 million miles in 251 orbits of the Earth.

Susan logged 472 hours in space over two missions and is the second woman to pilot a space shuttle. She recalled the first moments of piloting the space shuttle alongside the senior pilot and mission-in-charge.

Looking down at Earth from space the first time … it's like every dream come true. Even though you’ve seen pictures of Earth from space, it's not the same as being in space and looking at Earth. It was very rewarding.

== Awards and honors ==
Throughout her career she has been recognized and awarded in multiple occasions.

- Distinguished Graduate of Naval Aviation – Awarded by the Officer Candidate School.
- Distinguished Graduate of the United States Naval Test Pilot School, Class 103.
- Defense Superior Service Medal.
- Defense Meritorious Service Medal.
- Navy Commendation Medal.
- Navy Achievement Medal.
- NASA Space Flight Medals – Awarded twice.
- National Defense Service Medal.
- Ten Outstanding Young Americans Award – Recognition given by the United States Junior Chamber of Commerce.
- Daughters of the American Revolution – Good scout award, obtained in 1997.

In 2020, the newspaper USA Today named her a woman of the century. This was a way to commemorate the 100th anniversary of women being granted the right to vote in the United States.
