= Michael L. Gernhardt =

American astronaut and manager of Environmental Physiology Laboratory (born 1956)

Michael Gernhardt
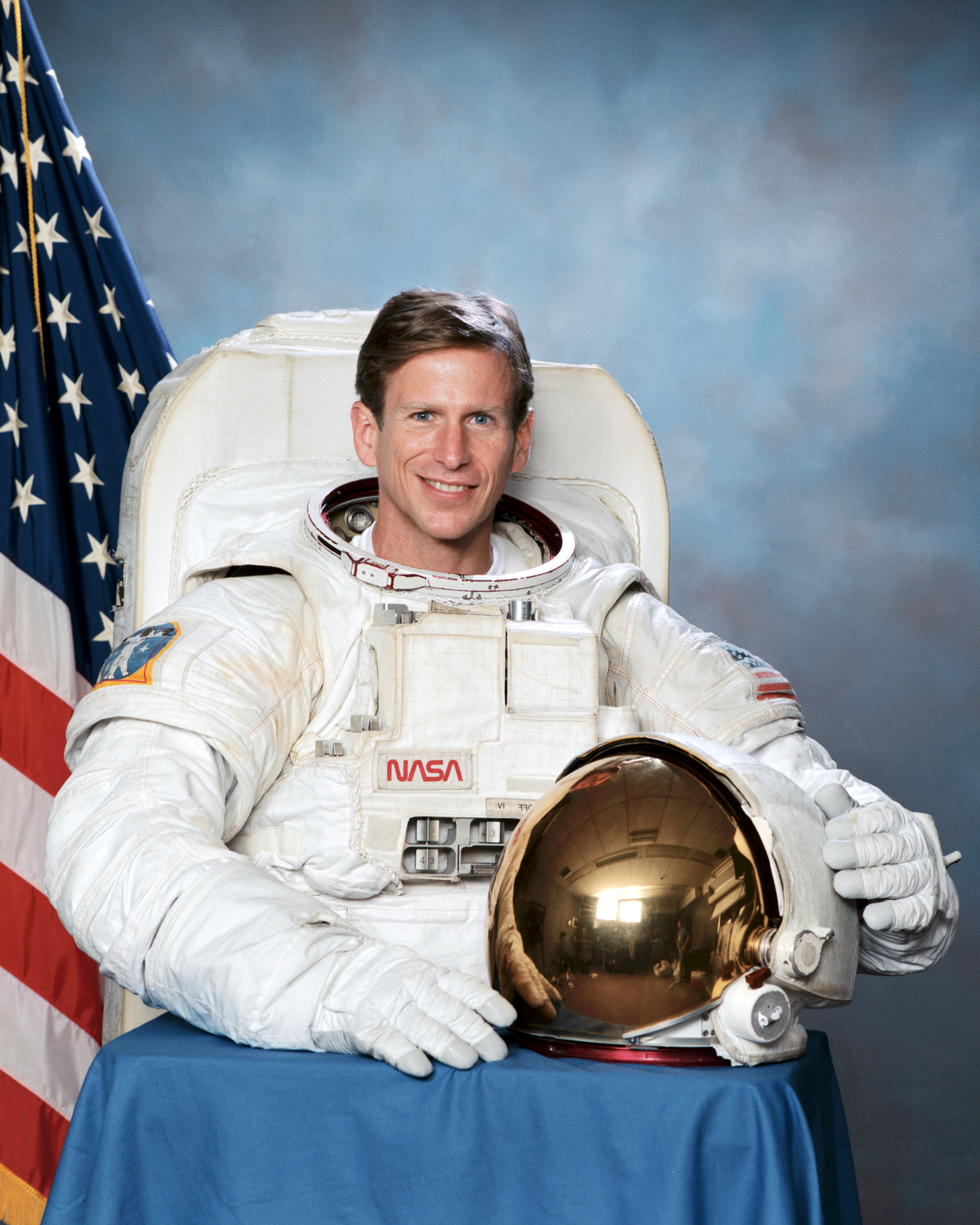
- Gernhardt in July 1995
- Born: Michael Landon Gernhardt; May 4, 1956 (age 70); Mansfield, Ohio, U.S.
- Education: Vanderbilt University (BS); University of Pennsylvania (MS, PhD)
- Space career

NASA astronaut
- Time in space: 43d 7h 1m
- Selection: NASA Group 14 (1992)
- Total EVAs: 4
- Total EVA time: 23h, 16m
- Mission: STS-69; STS-83; STS-94; STS-104

Michael Landon Gernhardt (born May 4, 1956) is a retired NASA astronaut, manager of the Environmental Physiology Laboratory, and principal investigator of the Prebreathe Reduction Program (PRP) at the Lyndon B. Johnson Space Center.

Gernhardt was selected as an astronaut in March 1992 and flew on four space shuttle missions: STS-69 (1995), STS-83 (1997), STS-94 (1997), and STS-104 (2001). Over his career, he spent more than 43 days in space and completed four spacewalks totaling 23 hours and 16 minutes. He also participated in NASA's first NEEMO mission in an underwater habitat and played a key role in later NEEMO missions that simulated lunar, Martian, and asteroid environments.

== Early life and education ==
Gernhardt was born in Mansfield, Ohio to Suzanne C. Winters and George M. Gernhardt. He graduated from Malabar High School in Mansfield, Ohio, in 1974. He went on to earn a Bachelor of Science degree in Physics from Vanderbilt University in 1978. He received a Master of Science degree in Bioengineering from the University of Pennsylvania in 1983 and a Doctorate in Bioengineering in 1991.

== Career ==
=== Undersea career ===
From 1977 to 1984, Gernhardt worked as a professional diver and project engineer on a variety of subsea oil field construction and repair projects around the world. He has logged over 700 deep sea dives, and has experience in air, mixed gas, bounce bell and saturation diving. During his diving career, Gernhardt attended graduate school at the University of Pennsylvania, and developed a new theoretical decompression model based on tissue gas bubble dynamics. He then participated in the development and field implementation of a variety of new decompression tables. From 1984 to 1988, Gernhardt worked as Manager, and then Vice President of Special Projects, for Oceaneering International. During this time, he led the development of a telerobotic system for subsea platform cleaning and inspection, as well as a variety of new diver and robot tools. In 1988, he founded Oceaneering Space Systems, a company formed to transfer subsea technology and operational experience to the ISS program. From 1988 until his selection by NASA in 1992, he worked on the development of new astronaut and robot-compatible tools for performing maintenance on Space Station Freedom. He also worked on the development of new portable life support systems and decompression procedures for extra-vehicular activity.

=== NASA career ===
At NASA, Gernhardt reported to the Johnson Space Center in August 1992. His technical assignments to date include:

- Flight software verification in the Shuttle Avionics Integration Laboratory (SAIL)
- Development of nitrox diving to support training for the Hubble Space Telescope repair, and on a variety of Space Station EVA developments
- Member of the astronaut support team at Kennedy Space Center, Florida, responsible for Shuttle prelaunch vehicle checkout, crew ingress/egress
- Spacecraft communicator (CAPCOM) at Mission Control Center, Houston, during various Shuttle missions
- Lead an international research team in developing a new exercise prebreathe protocol that improved the safety and efficiency of space walks from the ISS.

Gernhardt presently serves as a member of the astronaut office EVA branch, as Principal Investigator of the Prebreathe Reduction Program, and as Manager of JSC's Environmental Physiology Laboratory.

A four-flight veteran, Gernhardt has logged over 43 days in space, including 4 spacewalks totaling 23 hours and 16 minutes. He was a mission specialist on STS-69 in 1995, STS-83 in 1997, STS-94 in 1997, and STS-104 in 2001.

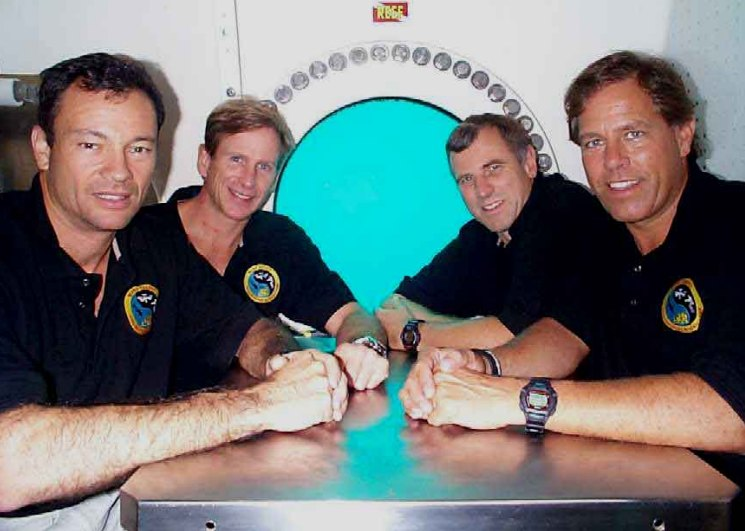
First NASA Extreme Environment Mission Operations (NEEMO) expedition crew

Gernhardt served as an aquanaut on the first NEEMO (NASA Extreme Environment Mission Operations) crew aboard the Aquarius underwater laboratory in October 2001. In April 2005, he was the commander of the NEEMO 8 mission.

Gernhardt drove the lunar rover prototype at President Barack Obama's inaugural parade on January 20, 2009.

On September 19, 2011, NASA announced that Gernhardt would participate in the NEEMO 15 mission in October 2011 from the DeepWorker submersible. The DeepWorker is a small submarine used as an underwater stand-in for the Space Exploration Vehicle, which might someday be used to explore the surface of an asteroid. In June 2012, Gernhardt piloted the DeepWorker as part of the NEEMO 16 mission, for which he was principal investigator.

== Spaceflight experience ==
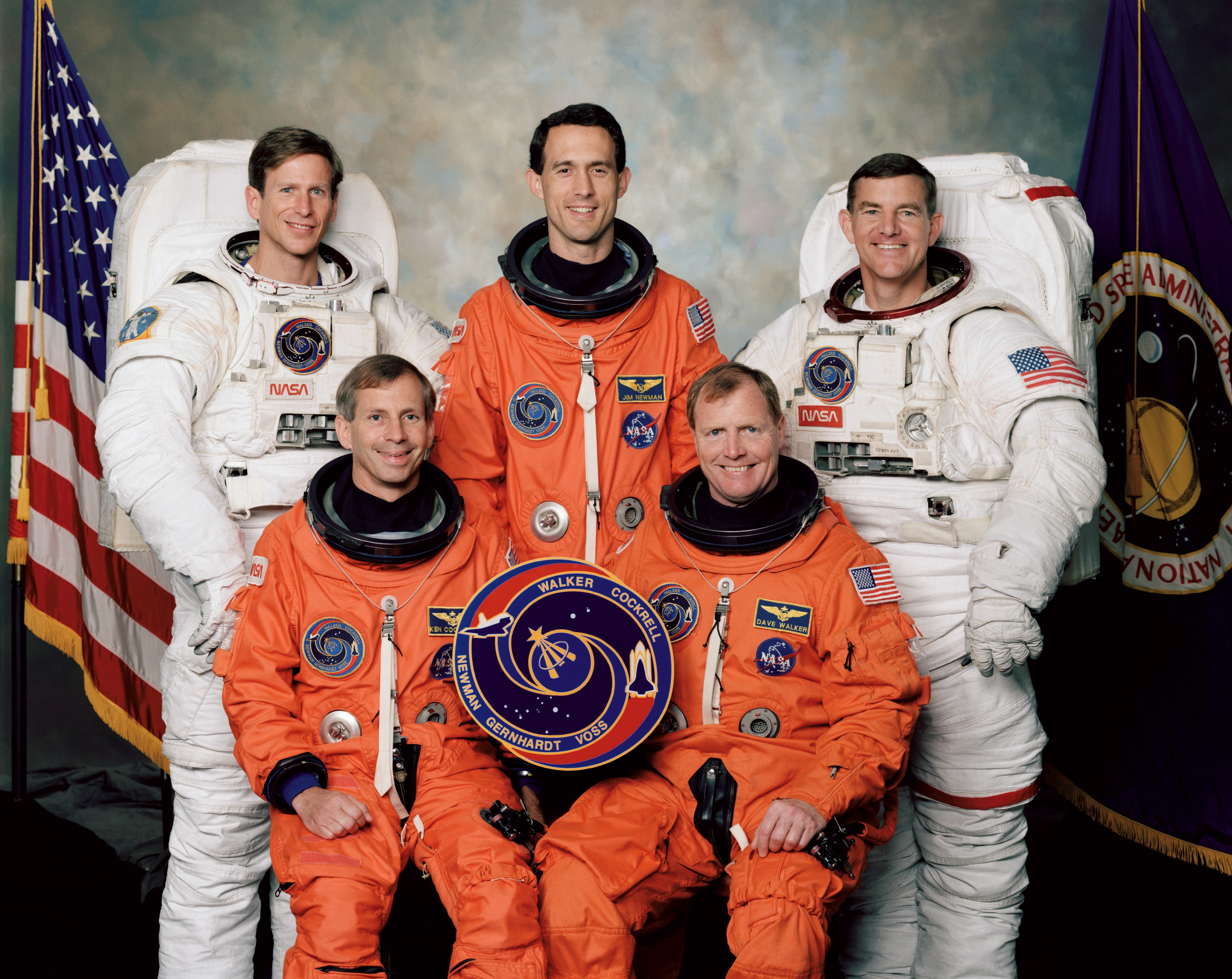
STS-69 crew

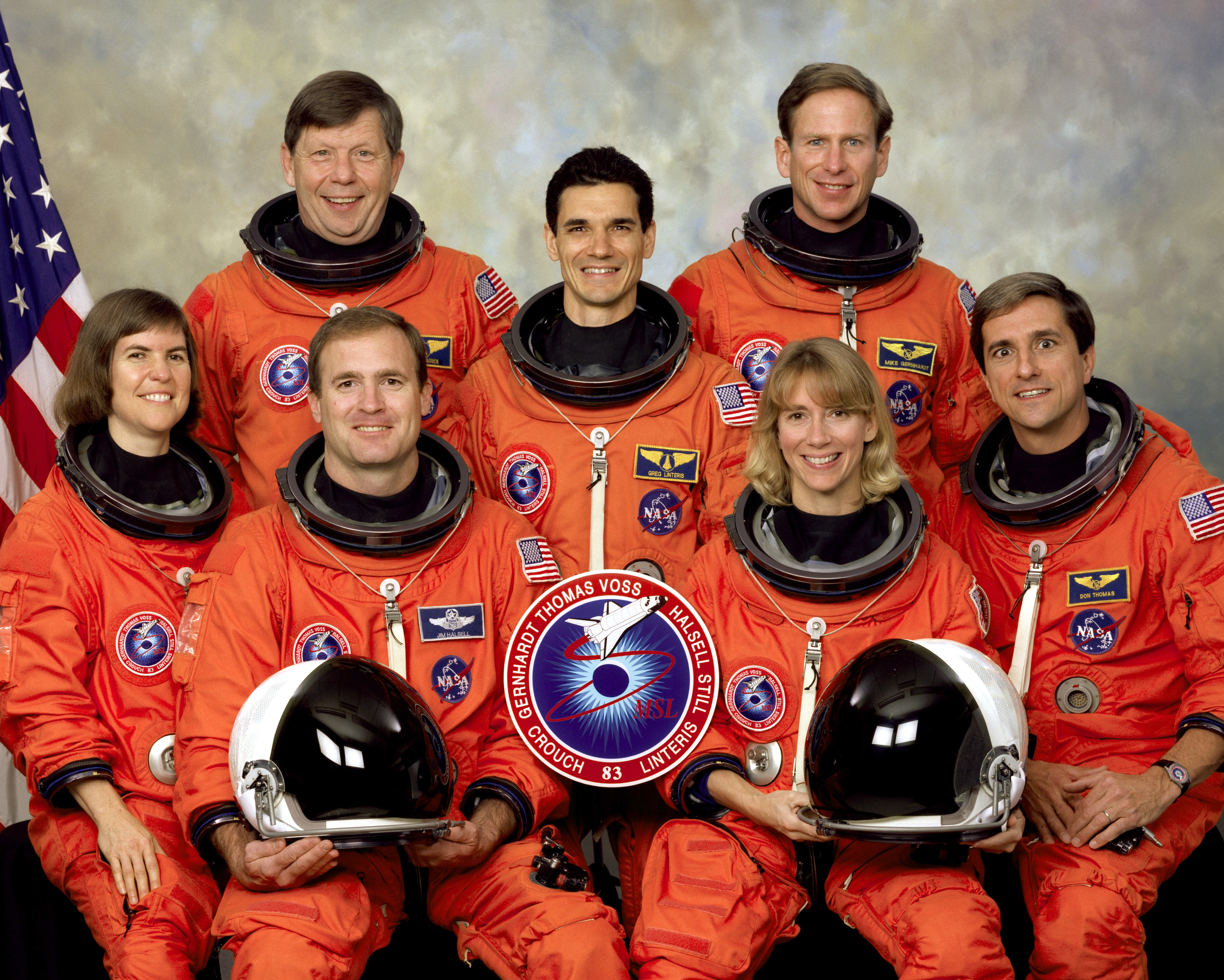
STS-83 crew

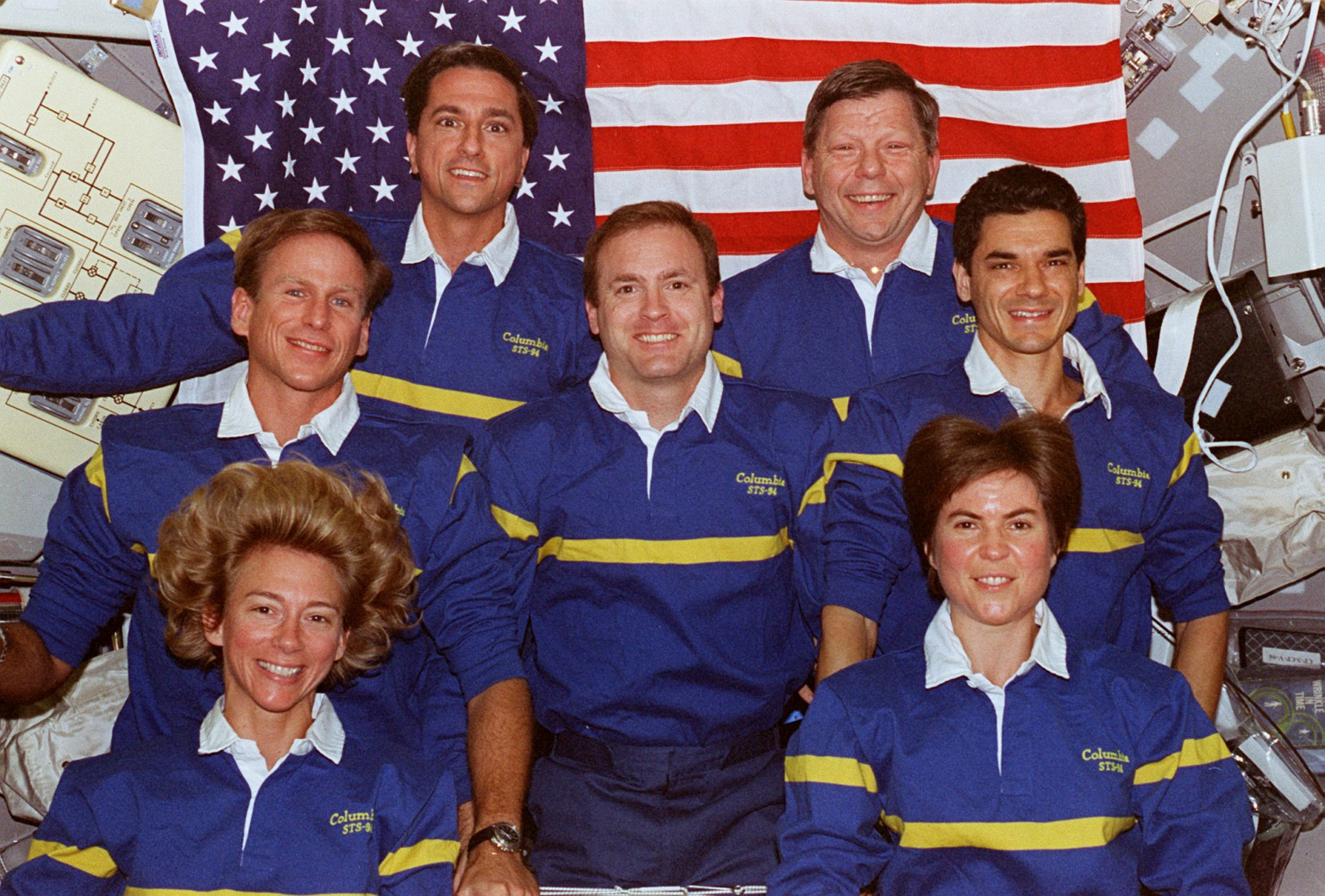
STS-94 crew

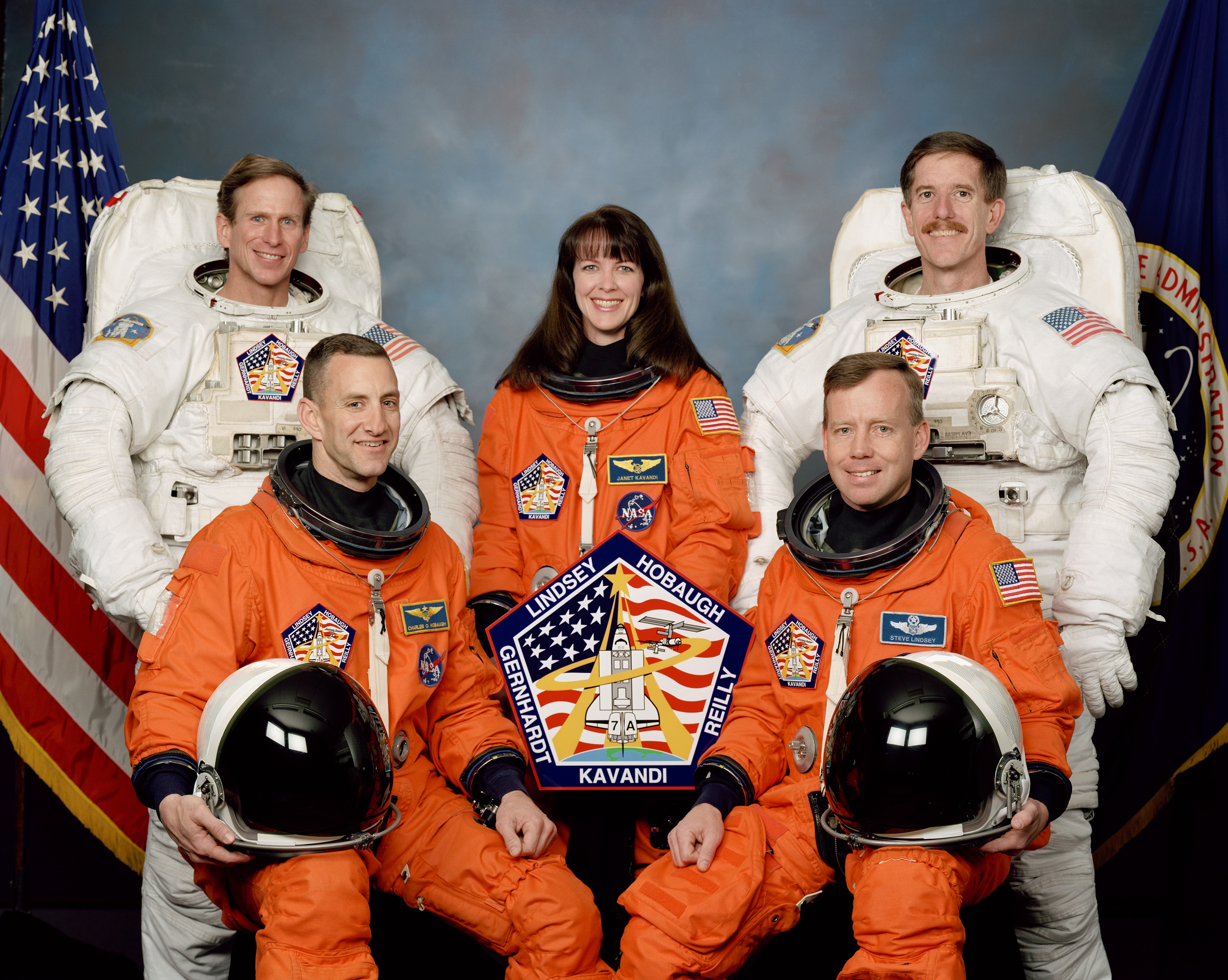
STS-104 crew

STS-69 (Endeavour) took place from September 7–18, 1995. Its prime objective was the successful deployment and retrieval of a SPARTAN satellite and the Wake Shield Facility (WSF). The WSF was designed to evaluate the effectiveness of using this free-flying experiment to grow semiconductors, high temperature superconductors and other materials using the ultra-high vacuum created behind the spacecraft, near the experiment package. Gernhardt was one of two astronauts to perform a spacewalk to evaluate future Space Station tools and hardware, logging 6 hours and 46 minutes of EVA. Mission duration was 260 hours, 29 minutes, and 8 seconds, traveling 4.5 million miles in 171 orbits of the Earth.

STS-83 (Columbia) took place from April 4–8, 1997. This was the Microgravity Science Laboratory (MSL-1) Spacelab mission, and it was cut short due to problems with one of the Shuttle's three fuel cell power generation units. Mission duration was 95 hours and 12 minutes, traveling 1.5 million miles in 63 orbits of the Earth.

STS-94 (Columbia) took place from July 1–17, 1997. This was a re-flight of the Microgravity Science Laboratory (MSL-1) Spacelab mission, and focused on materials and combustion science research in microgravity. Mission duration was 376 hours and 45 minutes, traveling 6.3 million miles in 251 orbits of the Earth.

STS-104 (Atlantis) took place from July 12–24, 2001. This was the 10th mission to the International Space Station (ISS). During the 13-day flight, the crew conducted joint operations with the Expedition-2 crew. Gernhardt was one of two astronauts to perform three spacewalks to install the joint airlock "Quest" (including the first US spacewalk from the ISS), and to outfit it with four high-pressure gas tanks. The mission was accomplished in 200 Earth orbits, traveling 5.3 million miles in 306 hours and 35 minutes.

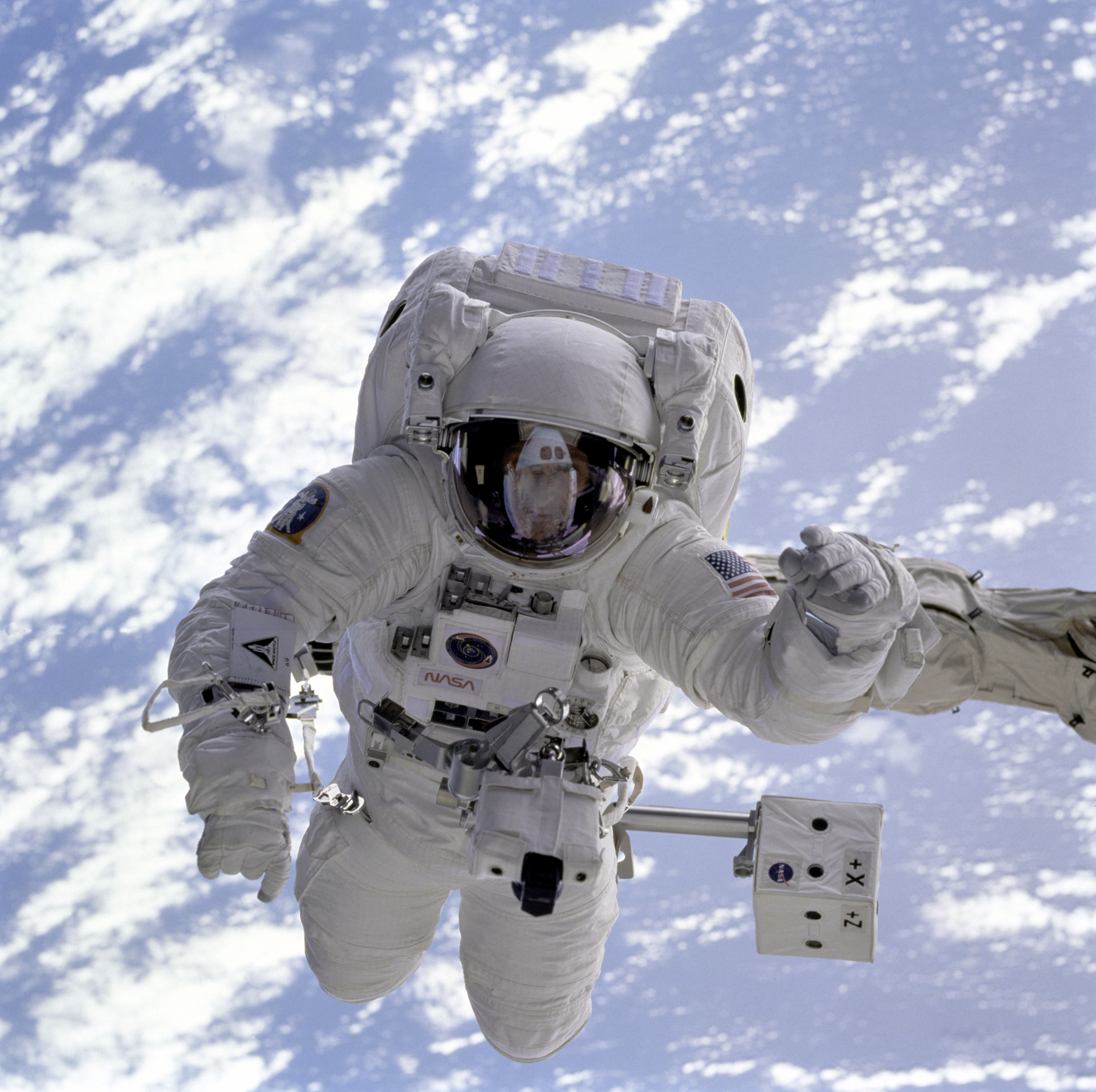
The pale blue Earth serves as a backdrop for astronaut Michael Gernhardt, who is attached to the Space Shuttle Endeavour's robot arm during a spacewalk on the STS-69 mission in 1995.

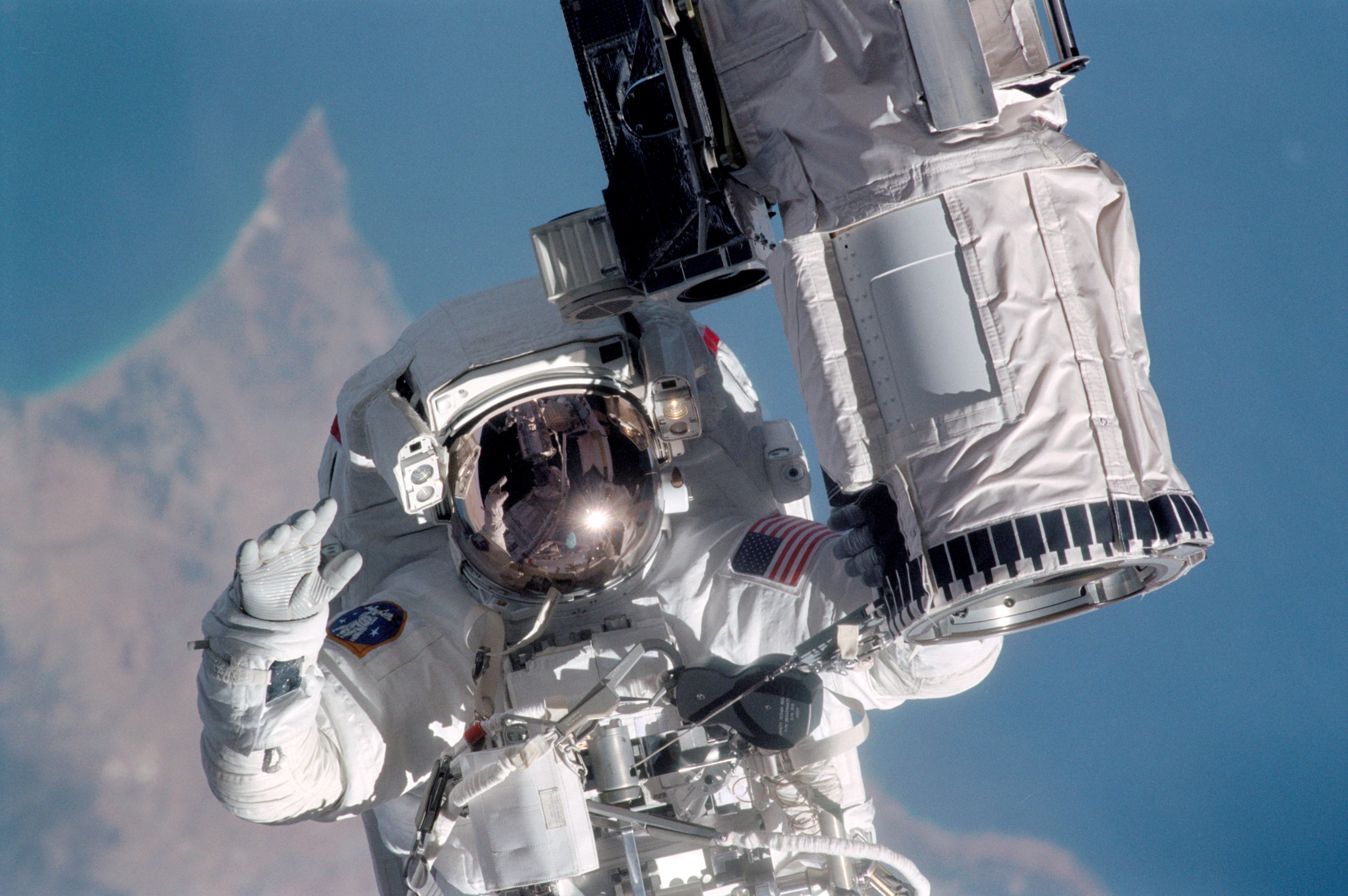
STS104-315-013 (July 12–24, 2001) --- Holding onto the end effector of the Canadarm on the Space Shuttle Atlantis, astronaut Michael L. Gernhardt, STS-104 mission specialist, participates in one of three STS-104 space walks.

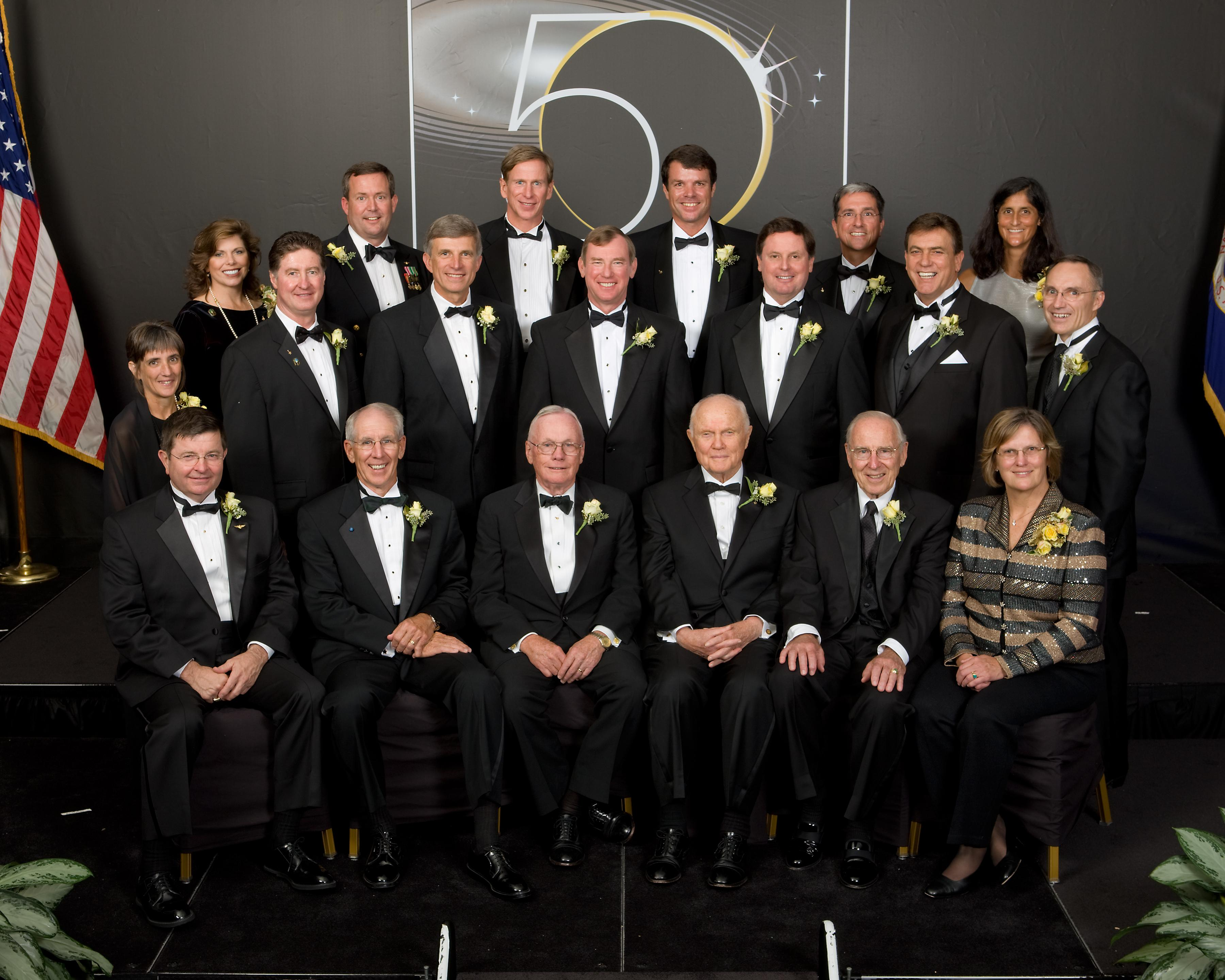
An all-star gathering of legendary American astronauts appeared in Cleveland August 29, 2008 to celebrate NASA's 50th anniversary.

== Awards and honors ==
- NASA Space Flight Medals (4)
- NASA Exceptional Service Medals (2)
- NASA Exceptional Achievement Medal
- NASA Distinguished Service Medal

== Personal life ==
He enjoys running, swimming, aviation, fishing, and scuba diving.
