= NASA Astronaut Corps =

Division of NASA which trains astronauts

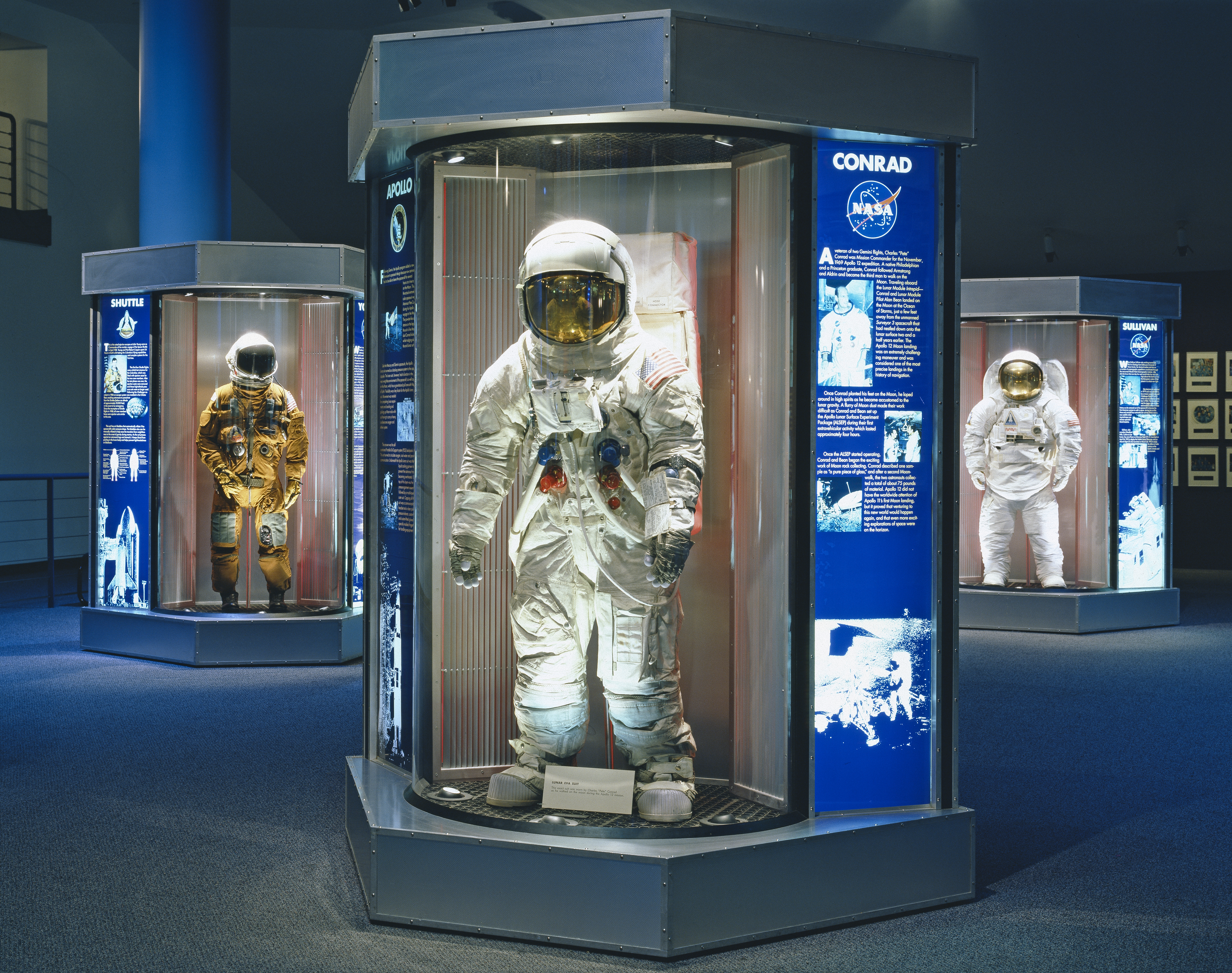
Some of NASA's space suits, previously worn by the Astronaut Corps, exhibited at the Space Center Houston visitor center (center, Pete Conrad's suit worn during the 1969 Apollo 12 mission, including his walk on the Moon).

The NASA Astronaut Corps is a unit of the United States National Aeronautics and Space Administration (NASA) that selects, trains, and provides astronauts as crew members for U.S. and international space missions. It is based at Johnson Space Center in Houston, Texas.

== History ==
The first American astronaut candidates were selected by NASA in 1959, for its Project Mercury with the objective of orbiting astronauts around the Earth in single-man capsules. The military services were asked to provide a list of military test pilots who met specific qualifications. After stringent screening, NASA announced its selection of the "Mercury Seven" as its first astronauts. Since then, NASA has selected 22 more groups of astronauts, opening the corps to civilians, scientists, doctors, engineers, and schoolteachers. As of the 2009 Astronaut Class, 61% of the astronauts selected by NASA have come from military service.

NASA selects candidates from a diverse pool of applicants with a wide variety of backgrounds. From the thousands of applications received, only a few are chosen for the intensive astronaut candidate training program. Including the "Original Seven", 339 candidates have been selected to date.

== Organization ==
The Astronaut Corps is based at the Lyndon B. Johnson Space Center in Houston, although members may be assigned to other locations based on mission requirements, e.g. Soyuz training at Star City, Russia.

The Chief of the Astronaut Office is the most senior leadership position for active astronauts in the Corps. The Chief Astronaut serves as head of the Corps and is the principal adviser to the NASA Administrator on astronaut training and operations. The first Chief Astronaut was Deke Slayton, appointed in 1962. The current Chief Astronaut is Scott Tingle.

=== Salary ===
Salaries for newly hired civilian astronauts are based on the federal government's General Schedule pay scale for grades GS-11 through GS-14. The astronaut's grade is based on the astronaut's academic achievements and experience. Astronauts can be promoted up to grade GS-15. As of 2023, astronauts based at the Johnson Space Center in Houston, Texas, earn between $79,766 (GS-11 step 1) and $183,500 (GS-15 step 6 and above). As of the new astronaut candidate class announcement of 2024, astronaut candidates will be removed from the GS pay scale and be paid on an AD 'Administratively Determined" scale.

Military astronauts are detailed to the Johnson Space Center and remain on active duty for pay, benefits, leave, and similar military matters.

== Qualifications ==
There are no age restrictions for the NASA Astronaut Corps. Astronaut candidates have ranged between the ages of 26 and 46, with the average age being 34. Candidates must be U.S. citizens to apply for the program.

There are three broad categories of qualifications: education, work experience, and medical.

Candidates must have a master's degree from an accredited institution in engineering, biological science, physical science or mathematics. The degree must be followed by at least two to three years of related, progressively responsible, professional experience (graduate work or studies) or at least 1,000 hours of pilot-in-command time in jet aircraft. An advanced degree is desirable and may be substituted for experience, such as a doctoral degree (which counts as the two years experience). Teaching experience, including experience at the K–12 levels, is considered to be qualifying experience.

Candidates must have the ability to pass the NASA long-duration space flight physical, which includes the following specific requirements:

- Distant and near visual acuity: Must be correctable to 20/20, each eye separately (corrective lenses such as glasses are allowed)
- The refractive surgical procedures of the eye, PRK and LASIK, are allowed, providing at least one year has passed since the date of the procedure with no permanent adverse after effects.
- Blood pressure not to exceed 140/90 measured in a sitting position
- Standing height between 5 feet 2 inches (157 cm) and 6 feet 3 inches (191 cm)

== Members ==
=== Active astronauts ===
As of November 2026, the corps has 31 "active" astronauts consisting of 14 women and 17 men. The highest number of active astronauts at one time was in 2000 when there were 149. All of the current astronaut corps are from the classes of 1996 (Group 16) or later.

Missions in italics are scheduled and subject to change.

| Astronaut | Missions | Group | Days in Space |
|---|---|---|---|
| Michael Barratt | 3: Soyuz TMA-14 (Expedition 19/20), STS-133, SpaceX Crew-8 (Expedition 70/71/72) | 18 (2000) | 446.64 |
| Kayla Barron | 1: SpaceX Crew-3 (Expedition 66/67), upcoming: SpaceX Crew-14 (Expedition 75/76) | 22 (2017) | 176.11 |
| Marcos Berríos | None, awaiting assignment | 23 (2021) | 0 |
| Christina Birch | None, upcoming: SpaceX Crew-14 (Expedition 75/76) | 23 (2021) | 0 |
| Stephen Bowen | 4: STS-126, STS-132, STS-133, SpaceX Crew-6 (Expedition 68/69) | 18 (2000) | 226.36 |
| Randolph Bresnik | 2: STS-129, Soyuz MS-05 (Expedition 52/53), upcoming: Artemis III | 19 (2004) | 149.51 |
| Deniz Burnham | None, upcoming: Soyuz MS-30 (Expedition 75/76) | 23 (2021) | 0 |
| Zena Cardman | 1: SpaceX Crew-11 (Expedition 73/74) | 22 (2017) | 166.71 |
| Raja Chari | 1: SpaceX Crew-3 (Expedition 66/67) | 22 (2017) | 176.11 |
| Luke Delaney | 1: SpaceX Crew-13 (Expedition 75) | 23 (2021) | Currently in space |
| Matthew Dominick | 1: SpaceX Crew-8 (Expedition 70/71/72) | 22 (2017) | 235.15 |
| Andre Douglas | None, upcoming: Artemis III | 23 (2021) | 0 |
| Tracy Caldwell Dyson | 3: STS-118, Soyuz TMA-18 (Expedition 23/24), Soyuz MS-25 (Expedition 70/71) | 17 (1998) | 372.77 |
| Jack Hathaway | 1: SpaceX Crew-12 (Expedition 74/75) | 23 (2021) | 237.22 |
| Bob Hines | 1: SpaceX Crew-4 (Expedition 67/68) | 22 (2017) | 170.54 |
| Warren Hoburg | 1: SpaceX Crew-6 (Expedition 68/69), upcoming: Boeing Starliner-2 | 22 (2017) | 185.95 |
| Nicole Mann | 1: SpaceX Crew-5 (Expedition 68) | 21 (2013) | 157.42 |
| Anne McClain | 2: Soyuz MS-11 (Expedition 57/58/59), SpaceX Crew-10 (Expedition 72/73) | 21 (2013) | 351.33 |
| Jessica Meir | 2: Soyuz MS-15 (Expedition 61/62), SpaceX Crew-12 (Expedition 74/75) | 21 (2013) | 441.86 |
| Anil Menon | 1: Soyuz MS-29 (Expedition 74/75) | 23 (2021) | Currently in space |
| Jasmin Moghbeli | 1: SpaceX Crew-7 (Expedition 69/70) | 22 (2017) | 199.10 |
| Loral O'Hara | 1: Soyuz MS-24 (Expedition 69/70) | 22 (2017) | 203.65 |
| Donald Pettit | 4: STS-113/Soyuz TMA-1 (Expedition 6), STS-126, Soyuz TMA-03M (Expedition 30/31), Soyuz MS-26 (Expedition 71/72) | 16 (1996) | 590.07 |
| Frank Rubio | 1: Soyuz MS-22/MS-23 (Expedition 67/68/69), upcoming: Artemis III | 22 (2017) | 370.89 |
| Nichole Stilwell | 1: SpaceX Crew-10 (Expedition 72/73) | 23 (2021) | 147.69 |
| Mark Vande Hei | 2: Soyuz MS-06 (Expedition 53/54), Soyuz MS-18/Soyuz MS-19 (Expedition 64/65/66) | 20 (2009) | 523.37 |
| Jessica Watkins | 2: SpaceX Crew-4 (Expedition 67/68), SpaceX Crew-13 (Expedition 75) | 22 (2017) | Currently in space |
| Douglas Wheelock | 2: STS-120, Soyuz TMA-19 (Expedition 24/25) | 17 (1998) | 178.40 |
| Christopher Williams | 1: Soyuz MS-28 (Expedition 73/74) | 23 (2021) | 241.04 |
| Stephanie Wilson | 3: STS-121, STS-120, STS-131 | 16 (1996) | 42.99 |
| Jessica Wittner | None, awaiting assignment | 23 (2021) | 0 |

There are also "international active astronauts", who are assigned to duties at the Johnson Space Center, and who were selected by their home agency to train as part of an NASA Astronaut Group and serve alongside their NASA counterparts. While the international astronauts go through training with the NASA Astronaut Corps, they are not considered members of the corps.

=== Management astronauts ===
As of November 2026, the corps has 11 "management" astronauts who remain NASA employees but are no longer eligible for flight assignment. The management astronauts included personnel chosen to join the corps as early as 1996 (Group 16) and as recently as 2013 (Group 21).

| Astronaut | Center | Assignment | Group |
|---|---|---|---|
| Joseph Acaba | Johnson Space Center | Advisor, mission planning and strategy | 19 (2004) |
| Serena Auñón-Chancellor | Johnson Space Center | Medical branch / CAPCOM | 20 (2009) |
| Eric Boe | Johnson Space Center | Chief of the Vehicle Integration Test Office | 18 (2000) |
| Yvonne Cagle | Ames Research Center | Fordham University visiting professor | 16 (1996) |
| Timothy Creamer | Johnson Space Center | Flight director | 17 (1998) |
| Alvin Drew | NASA Headquarters | Director for space sustainability | 18 (2000) |
| James Kelly | Johnson Space Center | CAPCOM Branch Chief for the Astronaut Office | 16 (1996) |
| Christina Koch | NASA Headquarters | Acting Deputy Chief Engineer | 21 (2013) |
| Kjell Lindgren | Johnson Space Center | Deputy Director of the Flight Operations Directorate | 20 (2009) |
| Stanley Love | Johnson Space Center | Deputy Chief of the Astronaut Office's Rapid Prototying Laboratory | 17 (1998) |
| Scott Tingle | Johnson Space Center | Chief of the Astronaut Office | 20 (2009) |

=== Emeritus astronauts ===
As of November 2026, the corps has two "emeritus" astronauts who are no longer NASA employees, and as such are no longer eligible for flight assignments, but donate their time to train and mentor current astronauts and other NASA staff members. As they are no longer on the NASA payroll, they are free to pursue other opportunities. The emeritus astronauts included personnel chosen to join the corps as early as 2009 (Group 20) and as recently as 2013 (Group 21).

| Astronaut | Missions | Group | Days in Space |
|---|---|---|---|
| Victor Glover | 2: SpaceX Crew-1 (Expedition 64/65), Artemis II | 21 (2013) | 176.33 |
| Reid Wiseman | 2: Soyuz TMA-13M (Expedition 40/41), Artemis II | 20 (2009) | 174.40 |

=== Astronaut candidates ===
The term "Astronaut Candidate" (informally "ASCAN") refers to individuals who have been selected by NASA as candidates for the NASA Astronaut Corps and are currently undergoing a candidacy training program at the Johnson Space Center. The most recent class of astronaut candidates was selected in 2025.

Only three astronaut candidates have resigned before completing training: Brian O'Leary and Anthony Llewellyn, both from the 1967 Selection Group, and Robb Kulin of the 2017 group. O'Leary resigned in April 1968 after additional Apollo missions were cancelled, Llewellyn resigned in August 1968 after failing to qualify as a jet pilot, and Kulin resigned in August 2018 for unspecified personal reasons. Another astronaut candidate, Stephen Thorne, died in an airplane accident before he could finish astronaut training.

=== Former members ===
Selection as an astronaut candidate and subsequent promotion to astronaut does not guarantee the individual will eventually fly in space. Some have voluntarily resigned or been medically disqualified after becoming astronauts before being selected for flights.

Civilian candidates are expected to remain with the corps for at least five years after initial training; military candidates are assigned for specific tours. After these time limits, members of the Astronaut Corps may resign or retire at any time.

Three members of the Astronaut Corps (Gus Grissom, Edward White, and Roger B. Chaffee) were killed during a ground test accident while preparing for the Apollo 1 mission. Fourteen were killed during spaceflight on Space Shuttle missions STS-51-L and STS-107. (Note: Three payload specialists were also killed on the two missions, but are not counted here because as payload specialists they were not considered members of the NASA Astronaut Corps.) Another four (Elliot See, Charles Bassett, Theodore Freeman, and Clifton Williams) were killed in T-38 plane crashes during training for spaceflight during the Gemini and Apollo programs. Another was killed in a 1967 automobile accident, and another died in a 1991 commercial airliner crash while traveling on NASA business.

Two members of the corps have been involuntarily dismissed: Lisa Nowak and William Oefelein. Both were returned to service with the US Navy.

==== A ====
- James Adamson – STS-28, STS-43
- Thomas Akers – STS-41, STS-49, STS-61, STS-79
- Buzz Aldrin – Gemini 12, Apollo 11
- Andrew Allen – STS-46, STS-62, STS-75
- Joseph Allen – STS-5, STS-51-A
- Scott Altman – STS-90, STS-106, STS-109, STS-125
- William Anders – Apollo 8
- Clayton Anderson – STS-117/STS-120 (Expedition 15), STS-131
- Michael Anderson – STS-89, STS-107
- Dominic Antonelli – STS-119, STS-132
- Jerome Apt – STS-37, STS-47, STS-59, STS-79
- Lee Archambault – STS-117, STS-119
- Neil Armstrong – Gemini 8, Apollo 11
- Richard Arnold – STS-119, Soyuz MS-08 (Expedition 55/56)
- Jeffrey Ashby – STS-93, STS-100, STS-112
- Serena Auñón-Chancellor – Soyuz MS-09 (Expedition 56/57)

==== B ====
- James Bagian – STS-29, STS-40
- Ellen Baker – STS-34, STS-50, STS-71
- Michael Baker – STS-43, STS-52, STS-68, STS-81
- Daniel Barry – STS-72, STS-96, STS-105
- Charles Bassett
- Alan Bean – Apollo 12, Skylab 3
- Robert Behnken – STS-123, STS-130, SpaceX Demo-2 (Expedition 63)
- John Blaha – STS-29, STS-33, STS-43, STS-58, STS-79/STS-81 (Mir EO-22)
- Michael Bloomfield – STS-86, STS-97, STS-110
- Guion Bluford – STS-8, STS-61-A, STS-39, STS-53
- Karol Bobko – STS-6, STS-51-D, STS-51-J
- Charles Bolden – STS-61-C, STS-31, STS-45, STS-60
- Frank Borman – Gemini 7, Apollo 8
- Kenneth Bowersox – STS-50, STS-61, STS-73, STS-82, STS-113/Soyuz TMA-1 (Expedition 6)
- Charles Brady – STS-78
- Vance Brand – Apollo-Soyuz Test Project, STS-5, STS-41B, STS-35
- Daniel Brandenstein – STS-8, STS-51-G, STS-32, STS-49
- Roy Bridges – STS-51-F
- Curtis Brown – STS-47, STS-66, STS-77, STS-85, STS-95, STS-103
- David Brown – STS-107
- Mark Brown – STS-28, STS-48
- James Buchli – STS-51-C, STS-61-A, STS-29, STS-48
- John Bull
- Daniel Burbank – STS-106, STS-115, Soyuz TMA-22 (Expedition 29/30)
- Daniel Bursch – STS-51, STS-68, STS-77, STS-108/STS-111 (Expedition 4)

==== C ====
- Robert Cabana – STS-41, STS-53, STS-65, STS-88
- Yvonne Cagle
- Fernando Caldeiro
- Charles Camarda – STS-114
- Kenneth Cameron – STS-37, STS-56, STS-74
- Duane Carey – STS-109
- Scott Carpenter – Mercury-Atlas 7
- Gerald Carr – Skylab 4
- Sonny Carter – STS-33
- John Casper – STS-36, STS-54, STS-62, STS-77
- Christopher Cassidy – STS-127, Soyuz TMA-08M (Expedition 35/36), Soyuz MS-16 (Expedition 62/63)
- Josh A. Cassada – SpaceX Crew-5 (Expedition 68)
- Gene Cernan – Gemini 9A, Apollo 10, Apollo 17
- Roger Chaffee – Apollo 1
- Gregory Chamitoff – STS-124/STS-126 (Expedition 17/18), STS-134
- Franklin Chang-Diaz – STS-61-C, STS-34, STS-46, STS-60, STS-75, STS-91, STS-111
- Philip Chapman
- Kalpana Chawla – STS-87, STS-107
- Leroy Chiao – STS-65, STS-72, STS-92, Soyuz TMA-5 (Expedition 10)
- Kevin Chilton – STS-49, STS-59, STS-76
- Laurel Clark – STS-107
- Mary Cleave – STS-61-B, STS-30
- Michael Clifford – STS-53, STS-59, STS-76
- Michael Coats – STS-41-D, STS-29, STS-39
- Kenneth Cockrell – STS-56, STS-69, STS-80, STS-98, STS-111
- Catherine Coleman – STS-73, STS-93, Soyuz TMA-20 (Expedition 26/27)
- Eileen Collins – STS-63, STS-84, STS-93, STS-114
- Michael Collins – Gemini 10, Apollo 11
- Pete Conrad – Gemini 5, Gemini 11, Apollo 12, Skylab 2
- Gordon Cooper – Mercury-Atlas 9, Gemini 5
- Richard Covey – STS-51-I, STS-26, STS-38, STS-61
- Timothy Creamer – Soyuz TMA-17 (Expedition 22/23)
- John Creighton – STS-51-G, STS-36, STS-48
- Robert Crippen – STS-1, STS-7, STS-41-C, STS-41-G
- Frank Culbertson – STS-38, STS-51, STS-105/STS-108 (Expedition 3)
- Walter Cunningham – Apollo 7
- Robert Curbeam – STS-85, STS-98, STS-116
- Nancy Currie – STS-57, STS-70, STS-88, STS-109

==== D ====
- Jan Davis – STS-47, STS-60, STS-85
- Alvin Drew – STS-118, STS-133
- Brian Duffy – STS-45, STS-57, STS-72, STS-92
- Charles Duke – Apollo 16
- Bonnie Dunbar – STS-61-A, STS-32, STS-50, STS-71, STS-89
- James Dutton – STS-131

==== E ====
- Joe Edwards – STS-89
- Donn Eisele – Apollo 7
- Anthony England – STS-51-F
- Joe Engle – Approach and Landing Tests, STS-2, STS-51I
- Jeanette Epps – SpaceX Crew-8 (Expedition 70/71/72)
- Ronald Evans – Apollo 17

==== F ====
- John Fabian – STS-7, STS-51-G
- Christopher Ferguson – STS-115, STS-126, STS-135
- Andrew J. Feustel – STS-125, STS-134, Soyuz MS-08 (Expedition 55/56)
- Michael Fincke – Soyuz TMA-4 (Expedition 9), Soyuz TMA-13 (Expedition 18), STS-134, SpaceX Crew-11 (Expedition 73/74)
- Jack Fischer – Soyuz MS-04 (Expedition 52/53)
- Anna Fisher – STS-51-A
- William Fisher – STS-51-I
- Michael Foale – STS-45, STS-56, STS-63, STS-84/STS-86 (Mir EO-23/24), STS-103, Soyuz TMA-3 (Expedition 8)
- Kevin Ford – STS-128, Soyuz TMA-06M (Expedition 33/34)
- Michael Foreman – STS-123, STS-129
- Patrick Forrester – STS-105, STS-117, STS-128
- Michael Fossum – STS-121, STS-124, Soyuz TMA-02M (Expedition 28/29)
- Theodore Freeman
- Stephen Frick – STS-110, STS-122
- C. Gordon Fullerton – Approach and Landing Tests, STS-3, STS-51-F

==== G ====
- Ronald Garan – STS-124, Soyuz TMA-21 (Expedition 27/28)
- Dale Gardner – STS-8, STS-51-A
- Guy Gardner – STS-27, STS-35
- Owen Garriott – Skylab 3, STS-9
- Charles Gemar – STS-38, STS-48, STS-62
- Michael Gernhardt – STS-69, STS-83, STS-94, STS-104
- Edward Gibson – Skylab 4
- Robert Gibson – STS-41-B, STS-61-C, STS-27, STS-47, STS-71
- Edward Givens
- John Glenn – Mercury-Atlas 6, STS-95
- Linda Godwin – STS-37, STS-59, STS-76, STS-108
- Michael Good – STS-125, STS-132
- Richard Gordon – Gemini 11, Apollo 12
- Dominic Gorie – STS-91, STS-99, STS-108, STS-123
- Ronald Grabe – STS-51-J, STS-30, STS-42, STS-57
- Duane Graveline
- Frederick Gregory – STS-51-B, STS-33, STS-44
- William Gregory – STS-67
- S. David Griggs – STS-51-D
- Gus Grissom – Mercury-Redstone 4, Gemini 3, Apollo 1
- John Grunsfeld – STS-67, STS-81, STS-103, STS-109, STS-125
- Sidney Gutierrez – STS-40, STS-59

==== H ====
- Nick Hague – Soyuz MS-10, Soyuz MS-12 (Expedition 59/60), SpaceX Crew-9 (Expedition 72)
- Fred Haise – Apollo 13, Approach and Landing Tests
- James Halsell – STS-65, STS-74, STS-83, STS-94, STS-101
- Kenneth Ham – STS-124, STS-132
- Blaine Hammond – STS-39, STS-64
- Gregory Harbaugh – STS-39, STS-54, STS-71, STS-82
- Bernard Harris – STS-55, STS-63
- Terry Hart – STS-41-C
- Henry Hartsfield – STS-4, STS-41-D, STS-61-A
- Frederick Hauck – STS-7, STS-51-A, STS-26
- Steven Hawley – STS-41-D, STS-61-C, STS-31, STS-82, STS-93
- Susan Helms – STS-54, STS-64, STS-78, STS-101, STS-102/STS-105 (Expedition 2)
- Karl Henize – STS-51-F
- Terence Henricks – STS-44, STS-55, STS-70, STS-78
- Jose Hernandez – STS-128
- John Herrington – STS-113
- Richard Hieb – STS-39, STS-49, STS-65
- Joan Higginbotham – STS-116
- David Hilmers – STS-51-J, STS-26, STS-36, STS-42
- Kathryn Hire – STS-90, STS-130
- Charles Hobaugh – STS-104, STS-118, STS-129
- Jeffrey Hoffman – STS-51-D, STS-35, STS-46, STS-61, STS-75
- Donald Holmquest
- Michael Hopkins – Soyuz TMA-10M (Expedition 37/38), SpaceX Crew-1 (Expedition 64/65)
- Scott Horowitz – STS-75, STS-82, STS-101, STS-105
- Douglas Hurley – STS-127, STS-135, SpaceX Demo-2 (Expedition 63)
- Rick Husband – STS-96, STS-107

==== I ====
- James Irwin – Apollo 15
- Marsha Ivins – STS-32, STS-46, STS-62, STS-81, STS-98

==== J ====
- Mae Jemison – STS-47
- Tamara Jernigan – STS-40, STS-52, STS-67, STS-80, STS-96
- Brent Jett – STS-72, STS-81, STS-97, STS-115
- Gregory C. Johnson – STS-125
- Gregory H. Johnson – STS-123, STS-134
- Thomas Jones – STS-59, STS-68, STS-80, STS-98

==== K ====
- Janet Kavandi – STS-91, STS-99, STS-104
- James Kelly – STS-102, STS-114
- Mark Kelly – STS-108, STS-121, STS-124, STS-134
- Scott Kelly – STS-103, STS-118, Soyuz TMA-01M (Expedition 25/26), Soyuz TMA-16M/Soyuz TMA-18M (ISS year-long mission: Expedition 43/44/45/46)
- Joseph Kerwin – Skylab 2
- Jonny Kim – Soyuz MS-27 (Expedition 72/73)
- Shane Kimbrough – STS-126, Soyuz MS-02 (Expedition 49/50), SpaceX Crew-2 (Expedition 65/66)
- Timothy Kopra – STS-127/STS-128 (Expedition 20), Soyuz TMA-19M (Expedition 46/47)
- Kevin Kregel – STS-70, STS-78, STS-87, STS-99

==== L ====
- Wendy Lawrence – STS-67, STS-86, STS-91, STS-114
- Mark Lee – STS-30, STS-47, STS-64, STS-82
- David Leestma – STS-41-G, STS-28, STS-45
- William Lenoir – STS-5
- Don Lind – STS-51-B
- Steven Lindsey – STS-87, STS-95, STS-104, STS-121, STS-133
- Jerry Linenger – STS-64, STS-81/STS-84 (Mir EO-22/23)
- Richard Linnehan – STS-78, STS-90, STS-109, STS-123
- Paul Lockhart – STS-111, STS-113
- Michael Lopez-Alegria – STS-73, STS-92, STS-113, Soyuz TMA-9 (Expedition 14)
- Christopher Loria
- John Lounge – STS-51-I, STS-26, STS-35
- Jack Lousma – Skylab 3, STS-3
- Jim Lovell – Gemini 7, Gemini 12, Apollo 8, Apollo 13
- G. David Low – STS-32, STS-43, STS-57
- Edward Lu – STS-84, STS-104, Soyuz TMA-2 (Expedition 7)
- Shannon Lucid – STS-51-G, STS-34, STS-43, STS-58, STS-76/STS-79 (Mir EO-21/22)

==== M ====
- Sandra Magnus – STS-112, STS-126/STS-119 (Expedition 18), STS-135
- Thomas Marshburn – STS-127, Soyuz TMA-07M (Expedition 34/35), SpaceX Crew-3 (Expedition 66/67)
- Michael Massimino – STS-109, STS-125
- Richard Mastracchio – STS-106, STS-118, STS-131, Soyuz TMA-11M (Expedition 38/39)
- Ken Mattingly – Apollo 16, STS-4, STS-51-C
- Megan McArthur – STS-125, SpaceX Crew-2 (Expedition 65/66)
- William McArthur – STS-58, STS-74, STS-92, Soyuz TMA-7 (Expedition 12)
- Jon McBride – STS-41-G
- Bruce McCandless – STS-41-B, STS-31
- William McCool – STS-107
- Michael McCulley – STS-34
- James McDivitt – Gemini 4, Apollo 9
- Donald McMonagle – STS-39, STS-54, STS-66
- Ronald McNair – STS-41-B, STS-51-L
- Carl Meade – STS-38, STS-50, STS-64
- Bruce Melnick – STS-41, STS-49
- Pamela Melroy – STS-92, STS-112, STS-120
- Leland Melvin – STS-122, STS-129
- Dorothy Metcalf-Lindenburger – STS-131
- Curt Michel
- Edgar Mitchell – Apollo 14
- Andrew R. Morgan – Soyuz MS-13/MS-15 (Expedition 60/61/62)
- Barbara Morgan – STS-118
- Lee Morin – STS-110
- Mike Mullane – STS-41-D, STS-27, STS-36
- Story Musgrave – STS-6, STS-51F, STS-33, STS-44, STS-61, STS-80

==== N ====
- Steven Nagel – STS-51-G, STS-61-A, STS-37, STS-55
- George Nelson – STS-41-C, STS-51-D, STS-26
- Bill Nelson – STS-61-C
- James Newman – STS-51, STS-69, STS-88, STS-109
- Carlos Noriega – STS-84, STS-97
- Lisa Nowak – STS-121
- Karen Nyberg – STS-124, Soyuz TMA-09M (Expedition 36/37)

==== O ====
- Ellen Ochoa – STS-56, STS-66, STS-96, STS-110
- Bryan O'Connor – STS-61-B, STS-40
- William Oefelein – STS-116
- John Olivas – STS-117, STS-128
- Ellison Onizuka – STS-51-C, STS-51-L
- Stephen Oswald – STS-42, STS-56, STS-67
- Robert Overmyer – STS-5, STS-51-B

==== P ====
- Scott Parazynski – STS-66, STS-86, STS-95, STS-100, STS-120
- Robert Parker – STS-9, STS-35
- Nicholas Patrick – STS-116, STS-130
- Donald Peterson – STS-6
- John Phillips – STS-100, Soyuz TMA-6 (Expedition 11), STS-119
- William Pogue – Skylab 4
- Alan Poindexter – STS-122, STS-131
- Mark Polansky – STS-98, STS-116, STS-127
- Charles Precourt – STS-55, STS-71, STS-84, STS-91

==== R ====
- William Readdy – STS-42, STS-51, STS-79
- Kenneth Reightler – STS-48, STS-60
- James Reilly – STS-89, STS-104, STS-117
- Garrett Reisman – STS-123/STS-124 (Expedition 16/17), STS-132
- Judith Resnik – STS-41-D, STS-51-L
- Paul Richards – STS-102
- Richard Richards – STS-28, STS-41, STS-50, STS-64
- Sally Ride – STS-7, STS-41-G
- Patricia Robertson
- Stephen Robinson – STS-85, STS-95, STS-114, STS-130
- Kent Rominger – STS-73, STS-80, STS-85, STS-96, STS-100
- Stuart Roosa – Apollo 14
- Jerry Ross – STS-61-B, STS-27, STS-37, STS-55, STS-74, STS-88, STS-110
- Kathleen Rubins – Soyuz MS-01 (Expedition 48/49), Soyuz MS-17 (Expedition 63/64)
- Mario Runco – STS-44, STS-54, STS-77

==== S ====
- Robert Satcher – STS-129
- Wally Schirra – Mercury-Atlas 8, Gemini 6A, Apollo 7
- Harrison Schmitt – Apollo 17
- Russell Schweickart – Apollo 9
- Francis Scobee – STS-41-C, STS-51-L
- David Scott – Gemini 8, Apollo 9, Apollo 15
- Winston Scott – STS-72, STS-87
- Richard Searfoss – STS-58, STS-76, STS-90
- Margaret Rhea Seddon – STS-51-D, STS-40, STS-58
- Elliot See
- Ronald Sega – STS-60, STS-76
- Piers Sellers – STS-112, STS-121, STS-132
- Brewster Shaw – STS-9, STS-61-B, STS-28
- Alan Shepard – Mercury-Redstone 3, Apollo 14
- William Shepherd – STS-27, STS-41, STS-52, Soyuz TM-31/STS-102 (Expedition 1)
- Loren Shriver – STS-51-C, STS-31, STS-46
- Deke Slayton – Apollo-Soyuz Test Project
- Michael Smith – STS-51-L
- Steven Smith – STS-68, STS-82, STS-103, STS-110
- Sherwood Spring – STS-61-B
- Robert Springer – STS-29, STS-38
- Thomas P. Stafford – Gemini 6A, Gemini 9A, Apollo 10, Apollo-Soyuz Test Project
- Heidemarie Stefanyshyn-Piper – STS-115, STS-126
- Robert Stewart – STS-41-B, STS-51-J
- Susan Still-Kilrain – STS-83, STS-94
- Nicole Stott – STS-128/STS-129 (Expedition 20/21), STS-133
- Frederick Sturckow – STS-88, STS-105, STS-117, STS-128
- Kathryn Sullivan – STS-41-G, STS-31, STS-45
- Steven Swanson – STS-117, STS-119, Soyuz TMA-12M (Expedition 39/40)
- Jack Swigert – Apollo 13

==== T ====
- Daniel Tani – STS-108, STS-120/STS-122 (Expedition 16)
- Norman Thagard – STS-7, STS-51-B, STS-30, STS-42, Soyuz TM-21/STS-71 (Mir EO-18)
- Joseph Tanner – STS-66, STS-82, STS-97, STS-115
- Andy Thomas – STS-77, STS-89/STS-91 (Mir EO-24/25), STS-102, STS-114
- Donald Thomas – STS-65, STS-70, STS-83, STS-94
- Kathryn Thornton – STS-33, STS-49, STS-61, STS-73
- William Thornton – STS-8, STS-51-B
- Pierre Thuot – STS-36, STS-49, STS-62
- Richard Truly – Approach and Landing Tests, STS-2, STS-8

==== V ====
- James Van Hoften – STS-41-C, STS-51-I
- Charles Veach – STS-39, STS-52
- Terry Virts – STS-130, Soyuz TMA-15M (Expedition 42/43)
- James Voss – STS-44, STS-53, STS-69, STS-101, STS-102/STS-105 (Expedition 2)
- Janice Voss – STS-57, STS-63, STS-83, STS-94, STS-99

==== W ====
- Rex Walheim – STS-110, STS-122, STS-135
- David Walker – STS-51-A, STS-30, STS-53, STS-69
- Shannon Walker – Soyuz TMA-19 (Expedition 24/25), SpaceX Crew-1 (Expedition 64/65)
- Carl Walz – STS-51, STS-65, STS-79, STS-108/STS-111 (Expedition 4)
- Mary Weber – STS-70, STS-101
- Paul Weitz – Skylab 2, STS-6
- James Wetherbee – STS-32, STS-52, STS-63, STS-86, STS-102, STS-113
- Ed White – Gemini 4, Apollo 1
- Peggy Whitson – STS-111/STS-113 (Expedition 5), Soyuz TMA-11 (Expedition 16), Soyuz MS-03/MS-04 (Expedition 50/51/52)
- Terrence Wilcutt – STS-68, STS-79, STS-89, STS-106
- Clifton Williams
- Donald Williams – STS-51-D, STS-34
- Sunita Williams – STS-116/STS-117 (Expedition 14/15), Soyuz TMA-05M (Expedition 32/33), Boeing Crew Flight Test/SpaceX Crew-9 (Expedition 71/72)
- Jeffrey Williams – STS-101, Soyuz TMA-8 (Expedition 13), Soyuz TMA-16 (Expedition 21/22), Soyuz TMA-20M (Expedition 47/48)
- Barry E. Wilmore – STS-129, Soyuz TMA-14M (Expedition 41/42), Boeing Crew Flight Test/SpaceX Crew-9 (Expedition 71/72)
- Peter Wisoff – STS-57, STS-68, STS-81, STS-92
- David Wolf – STS-58, STS-86/STS-89 (Mir EO-24), STS-112, STS-127
- Neil Woodward
- Alfred Worden – Apollo 15

==== Y ====
- John Young – Gemini 3, Gemini 10, Apollo 10, Apollo 16, STS-1, STS-9

==== Z ====
- George Zamka – STS-120, STS-130

== Selection groups ==
- 1959 Group 1 – "The Mercury Seven"
- 1962 Group 2 – "The New Nine"
- 1963 Group 3 – "The Fourteen"
- 1965 Group 4 – "The Scientists"
- 1966 Group 5 – "The Original 19"
- 1967 Group 6 – "The Excess Eleven (XS-11)"
- 1969 Group 7 – USAF MOL Transfer, no official nickname (astronauts selected from the Manned Orbiting Laboratory program)
- 1978 Group 8 – "Thirty-Five New Guys (TFNG)" (class included first female candidates)
- 1980 Group 9 – "19+80"
- 1984 Group 10 – "The Maggots"
- 1985 Group 11 – no official nickname
- 1987 Group 12 – "The GAFFers"
- 1990 Group 13 – "The Hairballs"
- 1992 Group 14 – "The Hogs"
- 1994 Group 15 – "The Flying Escargot"
- 1996 Group 16 – "The Sardines" (largest class to date, 35 NASA candidates and nine international astronauts)
- 1998 Group 17 – "The Penguins"
- 2000 Group 18 – "The Bugs"
- 2004 Group 19 – "The Peacocks"
- 2009 Group 20 – "The Chumps"
- 2013 Group 21 – "The 8-Balls" (first class with equal share men and women candidates)
- 2017 Group 22 – "The Turtles"
- 2021 Group 23 – "The Flies"
- 2025 Group 24 – "The Platypi" (first class with majority women candidates)

== See also ==
- Other astronaut corps:
  - Canadian Astronaut Corps
  - European Astronaut Corps
  - Indian Astronaut Corps (India)
  - JAXA Astronaut Corps (Japan)
  - Roscosmos Cosmonaut Corps (Russia)
  - People's Liberation Army Astronaut Corps (China)
- List of astronauts by selection
- Human spaceflight
- History of spaceflight
- United States Astronaut Hall of Fame
