= Danish Astronautical Society =

The Danish Astronautical Society was inaugurated on 20 September 1949, and its prime focus is spreading knowledge and information about spaceflight and space science. The Danish Astronautical Society participated in founding the International Astronautical Federation in 1951 and serves as the Danish section of the IAF.

== Goals and activities of the Danish Astronautical Society ==
The Danish Astronautical Society engages in efforts to communicate with the public of Denmark. For example, they arrange company visits to Danish aerospace companies and space institutions. The society also arranges public lectures on space-related material, has meetings, and shows exhibitions on spaceflight. As a section of the International Astronautical Federation, the goals of the Danish Astronautical Society are to promote the peaceful usage of space and to promote public knowledge regarding space (as well as scientific literacy).

== List of current and former honorary members of the DAS ==
- Helle Stub
- Henrik Stub
- Christian F. Rovsing
- Bjørn Franck Jørgensen
- Yvonne Darlene Cagle
- Thomas Reiter
- Preben Gudmandsen
- Georgi Grechko
- Jens Martin Knudsen
- Morten E. Olsen
- Erik O. Errebo-Knudsen
- Erling Buch Andersen
- Asger Lundbak
- Gunnar Helstrøm
- Hermann Oberth
- Leo Hansen
