= Fernando Caldeiro =

American astronaut (1958–2009)

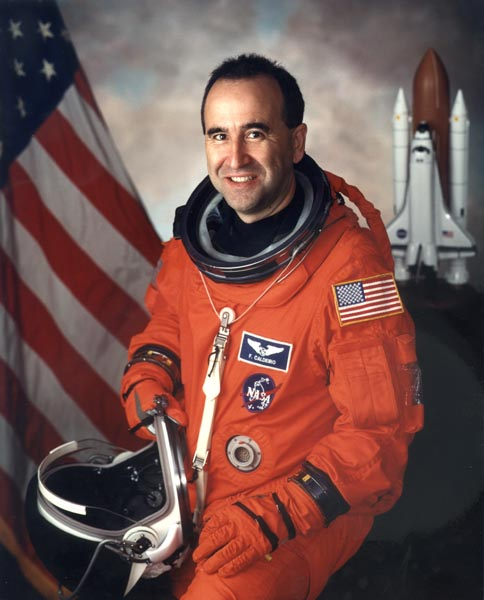
- Born: June 12, 1958; Ituzaingó, Argentina
- Died: October 3, 2009 (aged 51); League City, Texas, U.S.
- Education: Farmingdale State College (AS); University of Arizona (BS); University of Central Florida (MS)
- Space career

NASA astronaut
- Selection: NASA Group 16 (1996)

Fernando "Frank" Caldeiro (June 12, 1958 – October 3, 2009) was an Argentine-born American scientist and NASA astronaut, and the first person of Argentine descent to train for a spaceflight.

== Early life and education ==
Caldeiro was born on June 12, 1958, in the Ituzaingó district of Buenos Aires, Argentina, but considered New York City and Merritt Island, Florida, to be his hometowns. He immigrated into the United States when he was 16 and graduated from William Cullen Bryant High School in 1976, received an associate degree in applied science in aerospace technology from Farmingdale State College in 1978, a bachelor of science degree in mechanical engineering from the University of Arizona in 1984, and a master of science degree in engineering management from the University of Central Florida in 1995.

== Career ==
From 1985 to 1988, Caldeiro worked as a test director during the production and flight test of the Rockwell/USAF B-1B Lancer. In that capacity he was involved in the checkout and delivery of all 100 aircraft. In 1988, he was transferred by Rockwell International to the Kennedy Space Center as a Space Shuttle main propulsion system specialist. In this capacity he was the Rockwell International design center representative for the ground processing and launch of the Orbiter Discovery.

== NASA career ==
Caldeiro was hired by NASA KSC in 1991 as a cryogenics and propulsion systems expert for the safety and mission assurance office. He was also tasked by KSC management to undertake several special assignments where he served as the Executive Staff Assistant to the Director of Safety, Reliability and Quality Assurance. He actively participated in 52 space shuttle launches during his eight-year tenure at KSC.

Caldeiro wasn't originally considering becoming a NASA astronaut until his former boss insisted he sign up for the process. Selected by NASA as an astronaut candidate on May 1, 1996, as part of Astronaut Group 16, nicknamed "The Sardines", Caldeiro reported to the Johnson Space Center in August 1996. He was selected as an astronaut candidate after taking part in 52 space shuttle launches. He was qualified for flight assignment as a mission specialist after completing the prescribed two years of training and evaluation. In 1997, he was assigned to the Astronaut Office Station Operations Branch, where he served as lead astronaut of the ISS Environmental Controls and Life Support Systems and the European-built station modules. In that capacity he was involved in all aspects of design and manufacturing reviews for the MPLM, Node 2, Columbus Module and Cupola as well as equipment fit checks. Duties included support for the development of flight and maintenance procedures. From June 2005 to December 2006, Caldeiro served as the lead astronaut in charge of Shuttle software testing at the Shuttle Avionics Integration Laboratory. Duties included design, special testing, and verification of in-flight maintenance procedures. In January 2006, Caldeiro was reassigned to the WB-57 High Altitude Research Program at Flight Crew Operations, Aircraft Operations Division (AOD) at Ellington Field where he directed the integration and operation of high altitude atmospheric research experiments carried on board the NASA WB-57 aircraft.

== Death ==
Caldeiro died on October 3, 2009, following a 21/2 year battle with a brain tumor. He was survived by his wife, the former Donna Marie Emero of Huntington Beach, California, and two daughters (Ann and Michelle).

== Awards and honors ==
- Rockwell International Corporation Certificate of Commendation
- Kennedy Space Center Technical Leadership Certificate
- Group Achievement Awards (9)
- Kennedy Space Center Director Round Table Award
- Kennedy Space Center Superior Performance Awards (2)
- Kennedy Space Center Public Affairs Certificate of Appreciation for Service
- University of Central Florida Distinguished Alumni, 2001
- Tampa's Museum of Science and Industry Hispanic Scientist of the Year

Appointed in 2002 by President George W. Bush to serve in the President's Advisory Commission on Educational Excellence for Hispanic Americans under the No Child Left Behind Act.

== See also ==
- List of Hispanic astronauts
