= NASA Astronaut Group 16 =

1996 human spaceflight selection of 44 candidates; "The Sardines"

The Sardines
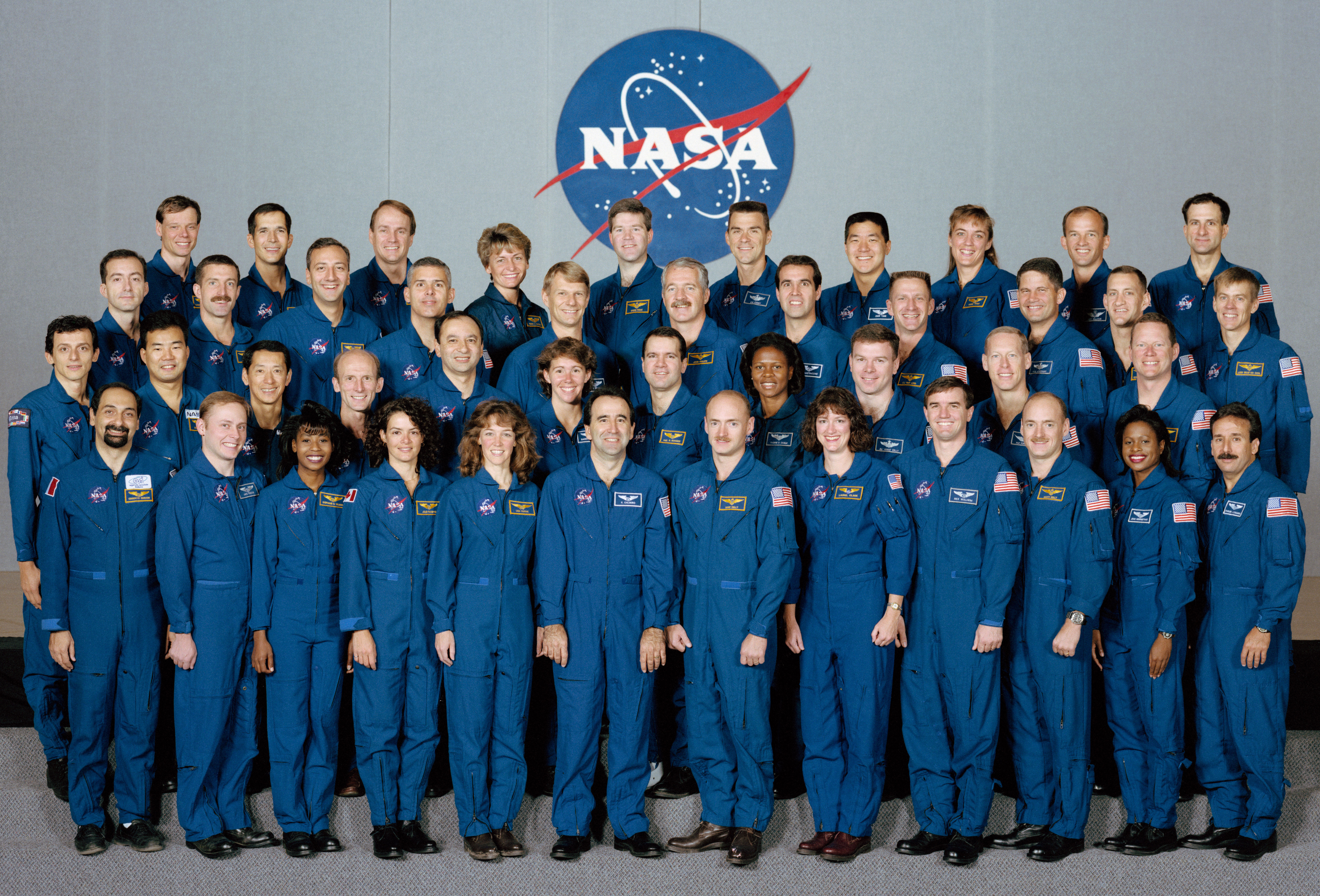
- The astronauts of Group 16
- Year selected: 1996
- Number selected: 44

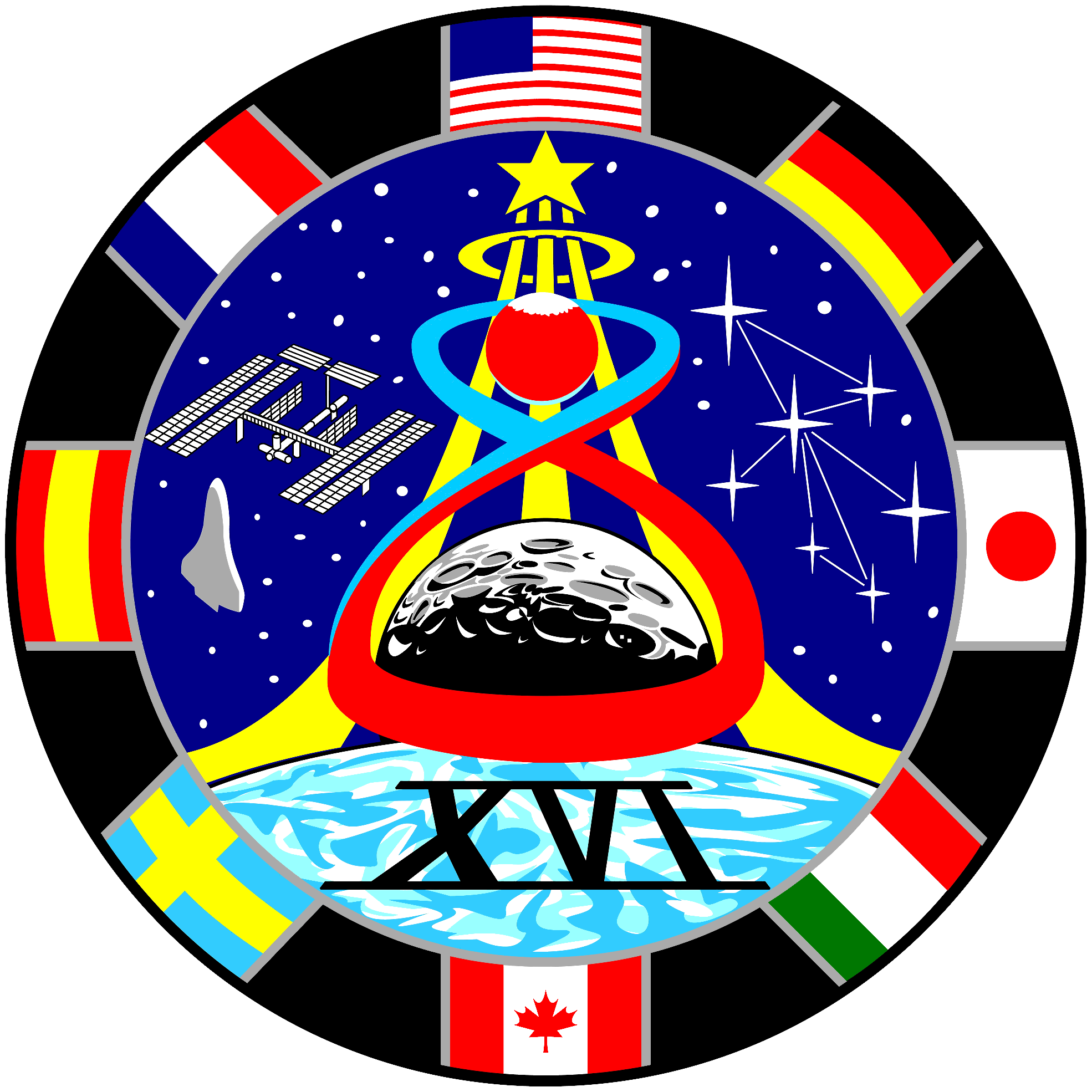
Class patch

NASA Astronaut Group 16 (nicknamed "The Sardines") was a group of 44 astronauts announced by NASA on May 1, 1996. The class was nicknamed "The Sardines" for being such a large class, humorously implying that their training sessions would be as tightly packed as sardines in a can. These 44 candidates compose the largest astronaut class to date. NASA selected so many candidates in preparation for the anticipated need for ISS crew members, along with regular shuttle needs. Nine of the 44 astronauts selected were from other countries, including 1 each from 5 European nations and 2 each from Canada and Japan.

Three members of this group, William C. McCool, David M. Brown, and Laurel B. Clark, died in the 2003 Space Shuttle Columbia disaster, during STS-107. These three received the Congressional Space Medal of Honor.

The group includes identical twins Mark and Scott J. Kelly. The group also includes Lisa Nowak, who was expelled from the astronaut corps in 2007.

== Pilots ==
- Duane G. Carey (1 flight)

Pilot, STS-109 Columbia (Hubble Space Telescope servicing mission; Columbia's last successful flight)

- Stephen Frick (2 flights)

Pilot, STS-110 Atlantis (ISS assembly mission – launched the S0 Truss Segment)
Commander, STS-122 Atlantis (ISS assembly mission – launched the Columbus Laboratory)

- Charles O. Hobaugh (3 flights)

Pilot, STS-104 Atlantis (ISS assembly mission – launched the Quest Joint Airlock)
Pilot, STS-118 Endeavour (ISS assembly mission – launched the S5 Truss Segment)
Commander, STS-129 Atlantis

- James M. Kelly (2 flights)

Pilot, STS-102 Discovery (ISS resupply mission)
Pilot, STS-114 Discovery (the first "Return to Flight" mission after the Space Shuttle Columbia disaster)

- Mark Kelly (4 flights; fellow astronaut Scott Kelly is his twin brother)

Pilot, STS-108 Endeavour (ISS supply mission)
Pilot, STS-121 Discovery (ISS resupply mission; second "Return to Flight" mission after the Space Shuttle Columbia disaster)
Commander, STS-124 Discovery (ISS assembly mission – launched the Japanese Experiment Module)
Commander, STS-134 Endeavour (ISS assembly mission – launched AMS-02 and ELC-3)

- Scott Kelly (4 flights; fellow astronaut Mark Kelly is his twin brother)

Pilot, STS-103 Discovery (Hubble Space Telescope servicing mission)
Commander, STS-118 Endeavour (ISS assembly mission – launched the S5 Truss Segment)
Soyuz TMA-01M (Expedition 25/26)
Soyuz TMA-16M/TMA-18M (Expedition 43/44/45/46) – ISS year long mission

- Paul Lockhart (2 flights)

Pilot, STS-111 Endeavour (ISS resupply mission)
Pilot, STS-113 Endeavour (launched the P1 Truss Segment, last flight before the Space Shuttle Columbia disaster)

- Christopher Loria (0 flights)

Assigned as the pilot for STS-113 but suffered herniated lumbar discs during mission training. Ultimately the injury resulted in his medical disqualification from further spaceflight assignments.

- William C. McCool (1 flight; died in the Space Shuttle Columbia disaster)

Pilot, STS-107 Columbia (orbital science mission; last flight of Space Shuttle Columbia – RCC panel damage resulted in disintegration of Columbia)

- Mark L. Polansky (3 flights)

Pilot, STS-98 Atlantis (ISS assembly mission – launched Destiny)
Commander, STS-116 Discovery (ISS assembly mission – launched the P5 Truss Segment)
Commander, STS-127 Endeavour

== Mission specialists ==
- David M. Brown (1 flight; died in the Space Shuttle Columbia disaster)

STS-107 Columbia (orbital science mission; last flight of Space Shuttle Columbia – RCC panel damage resulted in disintegration of Columbia)

- Daniel C. Burbank (3 flights)

STS-106 Atlantis (ISS supply mission)
STS-115 Atlantis (ISS assembly mission – launched the P3/P4 Truss Assemblies)
Soyuz TMA-22 (Expedition 29/30)

- Yvonne Cagle (0 flights)

As of October 2024, is a management astronaut (astronauts who remain NASA employees but are no longer eligible for flight assignment), assigned to NASA's Ames Research Center in Mountain View, California and serving as a visiting professor at Fordham University.

- Fernando Caldeiro (0 flights)

Died of a brain tumor before flight assignment

- Charles Camarda (1 flight)

STS-114 Discovery (the first "Return to Flight" mission after the Space Shuttle Columbia disaster)

- Laurel Clark (1 flight; died in the Space Shuttle Columbia disaster)

STS-107 Columbia (orbital science mission; last flight of Space Shuttle Columbia – RCC panel damage resulted in disintegration of Columbia)

- Michael Fincke (4 flights)

Soyuz TMA-4 (Expedition 9)
Soyuz TMA-13 (Expedition 18)
STS-134 Endeavour
SpaceX Crew-11 (Expedition 73/74)

- Patrick G. Forrester (3 flights), Chief of the Astronaut Office 2017–2020

STS-105 Discovery (ISS resupply flight)
STS-117 Atlantis (ISS assembly mission – launched the S3/S4 Truss Assemblies)
STS-128 Discovery

- John Herrington (1 flight)

STS-113 Endeavour (ISS assembly mission – launched the P1 Truss Segment)

- Joan Higginbotham (1 flight)

STS-116 Discovery (ISS assembly mission – launched the P5 Truss Segment)

- Sandra Magnus (3 flights)

STS-112 Atlantis (ISS assembly mission – launched the S1 Truss Segment)
STS-126 Endeavour/STS-119 Discovery (Expedition 18)
STS-135 Atlantis (Mission Specialist - Final Space Shuttle mission)

- Mike Massimino (2 flights)

STS-109 Columbia (Hubble Space Telescope servicing mission; Columbia's last successful flight)
STS-125 Atlantis (Hubble Space Telescope servicing mission)

- Richard Mastracchio (4 flights)

STS-106 Atlantis (ISS supply mission)
STS-118 Endeavour (ISS assembly mission – launched the S5 Truss Segment)
STS-131 Discovery
Soyuz TMA-11M (Expedition 38/39)

- Lee Morin (1 flight)

STS-110 Atlantis (ISS assembly mission – launched the S0 Truss Segment)

- Lisa Nowak (1 flight; dismissed from the Astronaut Corps and reassigned to the U.S. Navy)

STS-121 Discovery (ISS resupply mission)

Lisa Nowak was arrested on February 5, 2007, after confronting a woman entangled in a love triangle with a fellow astronaut. She was fired by NASA on March 7, and she became the first astronaut to be both grounded and dismissed (prior astronauts who were grounded due to non-medical issues usually resigned or retired).

- Donald Pettit (4 flights)

STS-113 Endeavour / Soyuz TMA-1 (Expedition 6)
STS-126 Endeavour (ISS resupply mission ULF2)
Soyuz TMA-03M (Expedition 30/31)
Soyuz MS-26 (Expedition 71/72)

- John L. Phillips (3 flights)

STS-100 Endeavour (ISS assembly mission – launched Canadarm2)
Soyuz TMA-6 (Expedition 11)
STS-119 Discovery

- Paul W. Richards (1 flight)

STS-102 Discovery (ISS resupply mission)

- Piers Sellers (3 flights)

STS-112 Atlantis (ISS assembly mission – launched the S1 Truss Segment)
STS-121 Discovery (ISS resupply mission)
STS-132 Atlantis

- Heidemarie Stefanyshyn-Piper (2 flights)

STS-115 Atlantis (ISS assembly mission – launched the P3/P4 Truss Assemblies)
STS-126 Endeavour (ISS resupply mission ULF2)

- Daniel M. Tani (2 flights)

STS-108 Endeavour (ISS supply mission)
STS-120 Discovery / STS-122 Atlantis (Expedition 16)

- Rex J. Walheim (3 flights)

STS-110 Atlantis (ISS assembly mission – launched the S0 Truss Segment)
STS-122 Atlantis (ISS assembly mission – launched the Columbus Laboratory)
STS-135 Atlantis

- Peggy Whitson (5 flights, 3 with NASA)

STS-111 Endeavour / STS-113 Endeavour (Expedition 5)
Soyuz TMA-11 (Expedition 16)
Soyuz MS-03 / MS-04 (Expedition 50/51/52)
After her retirement from NASA, she was hired by Axiom Space, where she has commanded these missions:
Axiom Mission 2
Axiom Mission 4

- Jeffrey Williams (4 flights)

STS-101 Atlantis (ISS supply mission)
Soyuz TMA-8 (the launch and landing vehicle of Expedition 13)
ISS Expedition 13 (6 month mission to the ISS)
Soyuz TMA-16, ISS Expedition 21/22
Soyuz TMA-20M, ISS Expedition 47/48

- Stephanie Wilson (3 flights)

STS-121 Discovery (ISS resupply mission; second Return to Flight mission after the Space Shuttle Columbia disaster)
STS-120 Discovery (ISS assembly mission – launched Harmony (Node 2))
STS-131 Discovery

== International mission specialists ==
- Pedro Duque (Spain; 2 flights)

STS-95 Discovery (orbital science mission)
Soyuz TMA-3 / TMA-2

- Christer Fuglesang (Sweden; 2 flights)

STS-116 Discovery (ISS assembly mission – launched the P5 Truss Segment)
STS-128 Discovery

- Umberto Guidoni (Italy; 2 flights)

STS-75 Columbia (orbital science mission) – flight performed before being selected as Mission Specialist
STS-100 Endeavour (ISS assembly mission – launched Canadarm2)

- Steven MacLean (Canada; 2 flights)

STS-52 Columbia (deployed the LAGEOS-II Satellite) – flight performed before being selected as Mission Specialist
STS-115 Atlantis (ISS assembly mission – launched the P3/P4 Truss Assemblies)

- Mamoru Mohri (Japan; 2 flights)

STS-47 Endeavour (orbital science mission) – flight performed before being selected as Mission Specialist
STS-99 Endeavour (Shuttle Radar Topography Mission)

- Soichi Noguchi (Japan; 3 flights)

STS-114 Discovery (the first "Return to Flight" mission after the Space Shuttle Columbia disaster)
Soyuz TMA-17 (Expedition 22/23)
SpaceX Crew-1 (Expedition 64/65)

- Julie Payette (Canada; 2 flights) on 2 October 2017, became the 29th Governor General of Canada.

STS-96 Discovery (ISS supply mission)
STS-127 Endeavour (ISS supply mission)

- Philippe Perrin (France; 1 flight)

STS-111 Endeavour (ISS resupply mission)

- Gerhard Thiele (Germany; 1 flight)

STS-99 Endeavour (Shuttle Radar Topography Mission)

== See also ==
- List of astronauts by year of selection
