= Rex J. Walheim =

American astronaut, engineer and USAF colonel (born 1962)

Rex Walheim
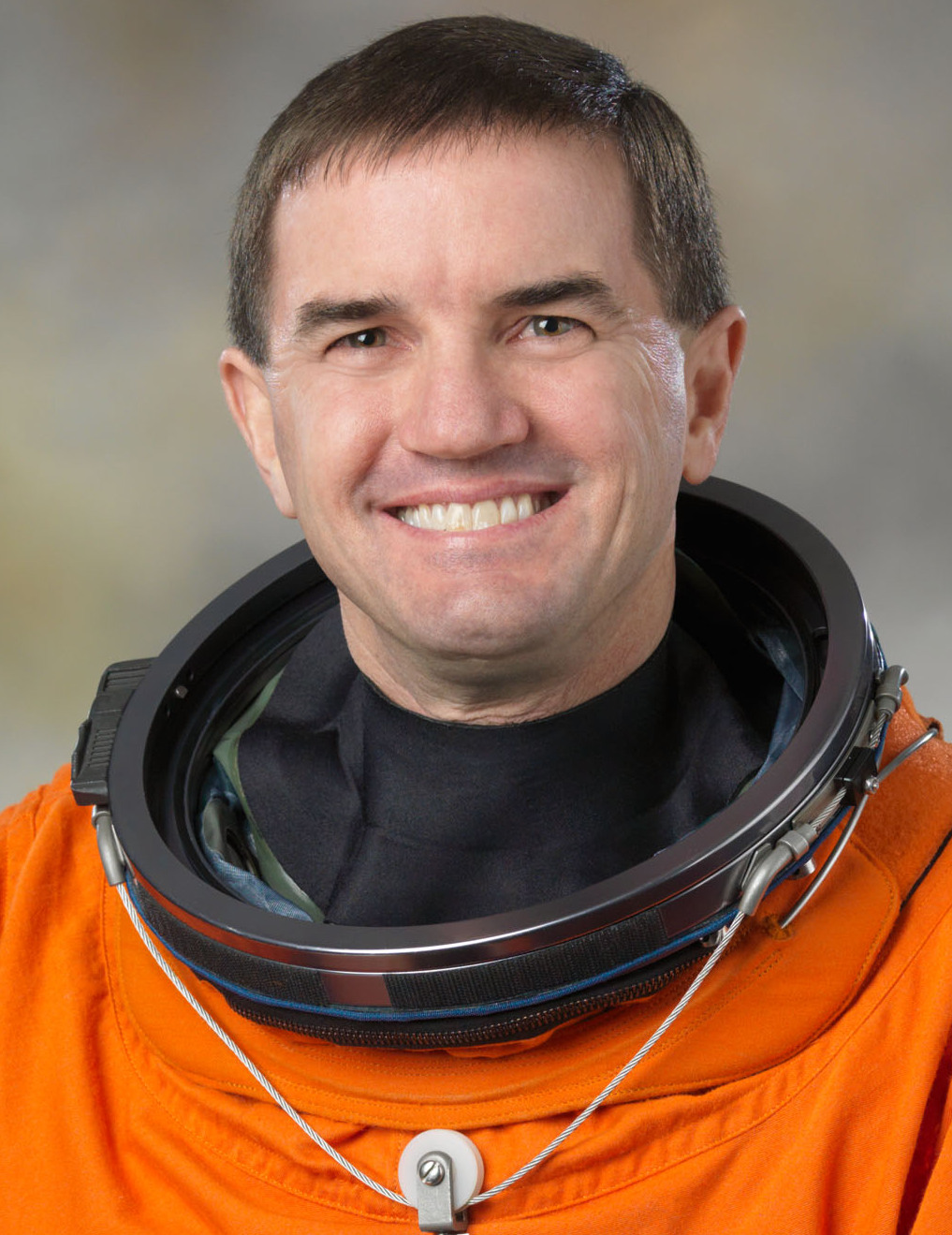
- Walheim in 2011
- Born: Rex Joseph Walheim; October 10, 1962 (age 63); Redwood City, California, U.S.
- Education: University of California, Berkeley (BS); University of Houston (MS)
- Space career

NASA astronaut
- Rank: Colonel, USAF
- Time in space: 36d 8h 31m
- Selection: NASA Group 16 (1996)
- Total EVAs: 5
- Total EVA time: 36h, 23m
- Missions: STS-110; STS-122; STS-135
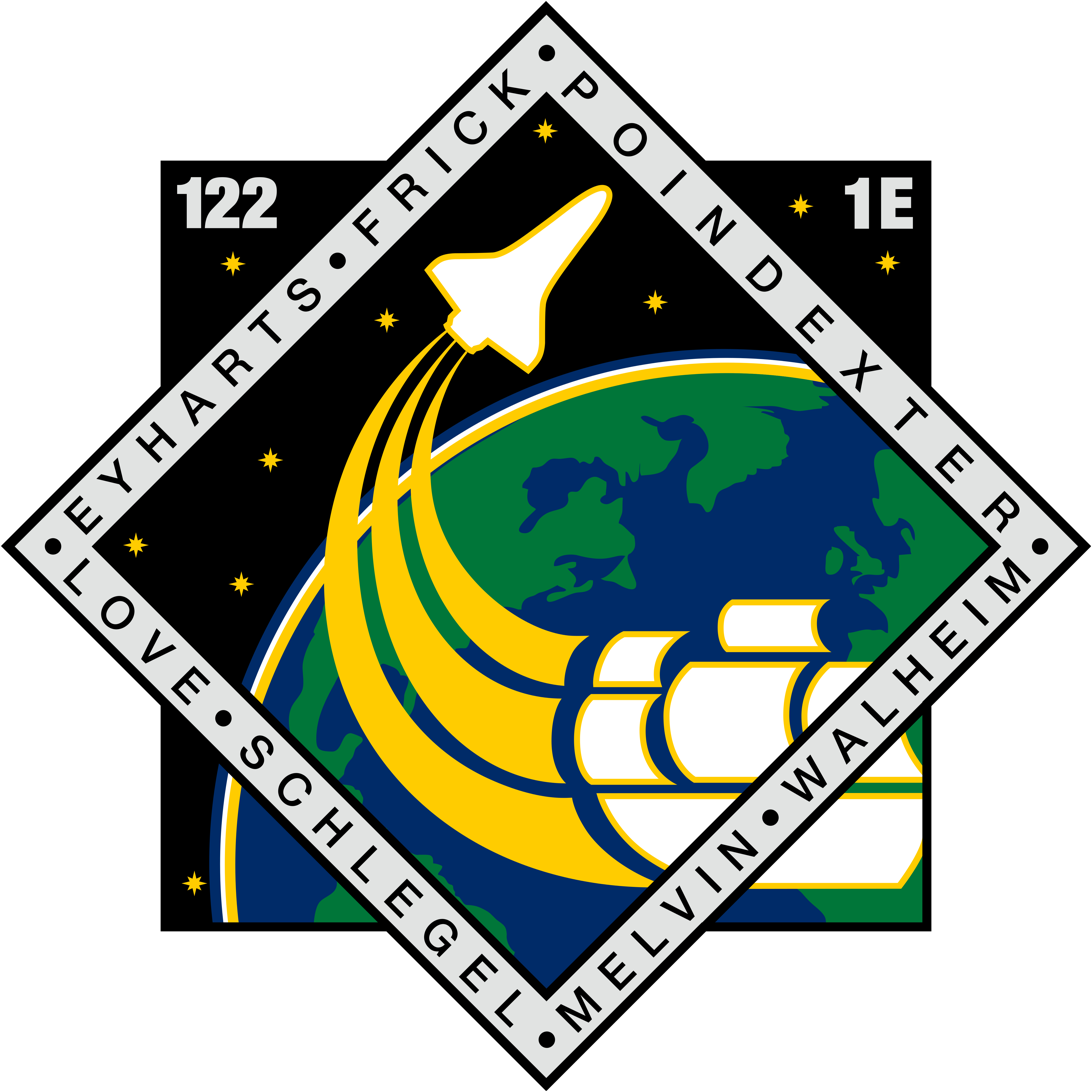
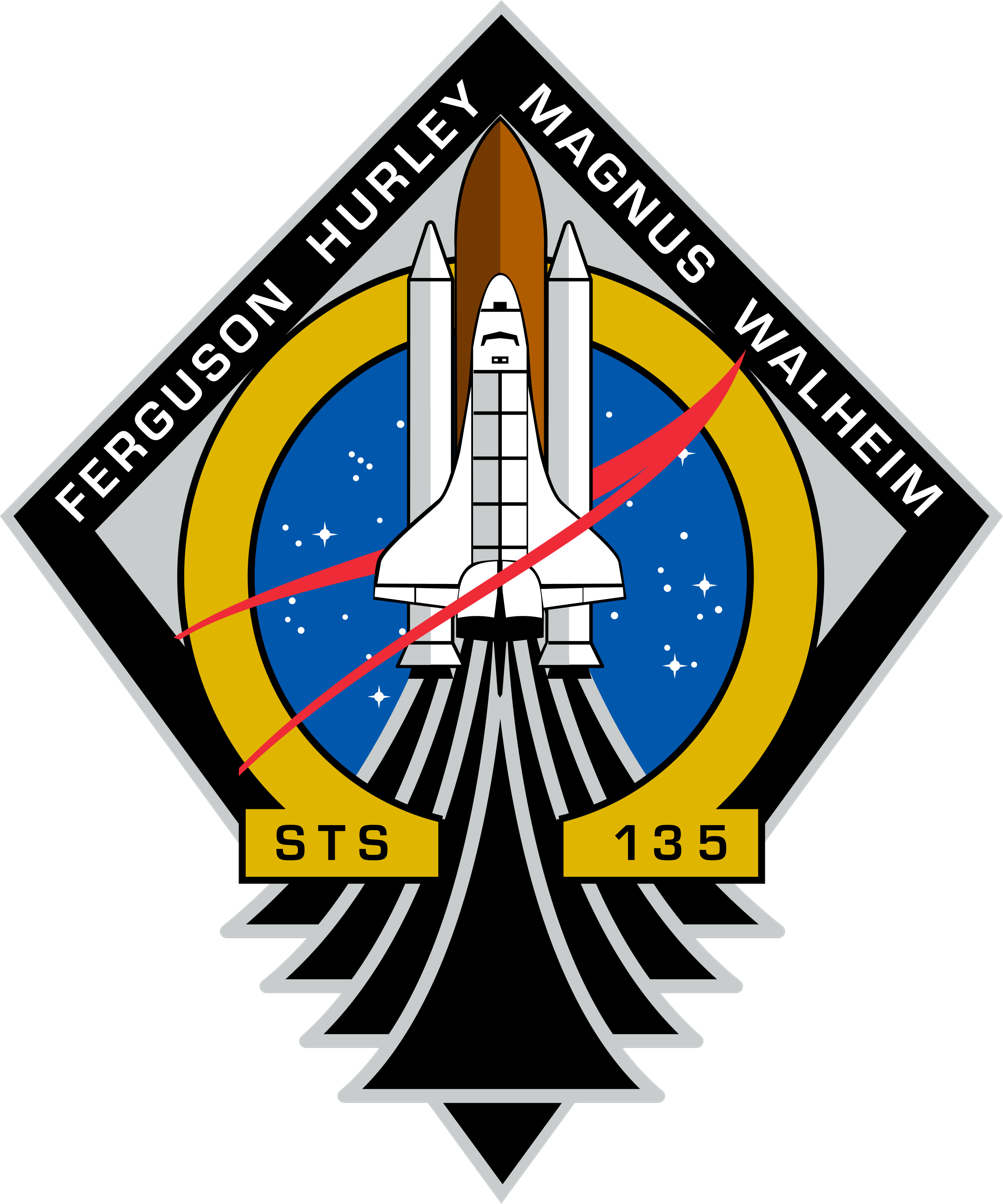
- Mission insignia

Rex Joseph Walheim (born October 10, 1962) is a retired United States Air Force officer, engineer and NASA astronaut. He flew three Space Shuttle missions, STS-110, STS-122, and STS-135. Walheim logged over 566 hours in space, including 36 hours and 23 minutes of spacewalk (EVA) time. He was assigned as mission specialist and flight engineer on STS-135, the final Space Shuttle mission.

== Early life ==
Walheim was born in Redwood City, California, but considers San Carlos, California, his hometown.

== Education ==
Walheim graduated from San Carlos High School in 1980 and received a Bachelor of Science degree in mechanical engineering from the University of California, Berkeley in 1984. He then received a Master of Science degree in industrial engineering from the University of Houston in 1989.

== Military career ==
Walheim was commissioned as a second lieutenant in the Air Force in May 1984. In April 1985 he was assigned to Cavalier Air Force Station in Cavalier, North Dakota, where he worked as a missile warning operations crew commander. In October 1986, he was reassigned to the Johnson Space Center, in Houston, Texas, where he worked as a mechanical systems flight controller and was the lead operations engineer for the Space Shuttle landing gear, brakes, and emergency runway barrier.

Walheim was transferred to Headquarters Air Force Space Command in Colorado Springs, Colorado, in August 1989, where he was manager of a program upgrading missile warning radars. He was selected for USAF Test Pilot School in 1991, and attended the course at Edwards AFB in California in 1992. Following graduation, he was assigned to the F-16 Combined Test Force at Edwards where he was a project manager, and then commander of the avionics and armament flight. In January 1996, Walheim became an instructor at USAF Test Pilot School, where he served until he began astronaut training.

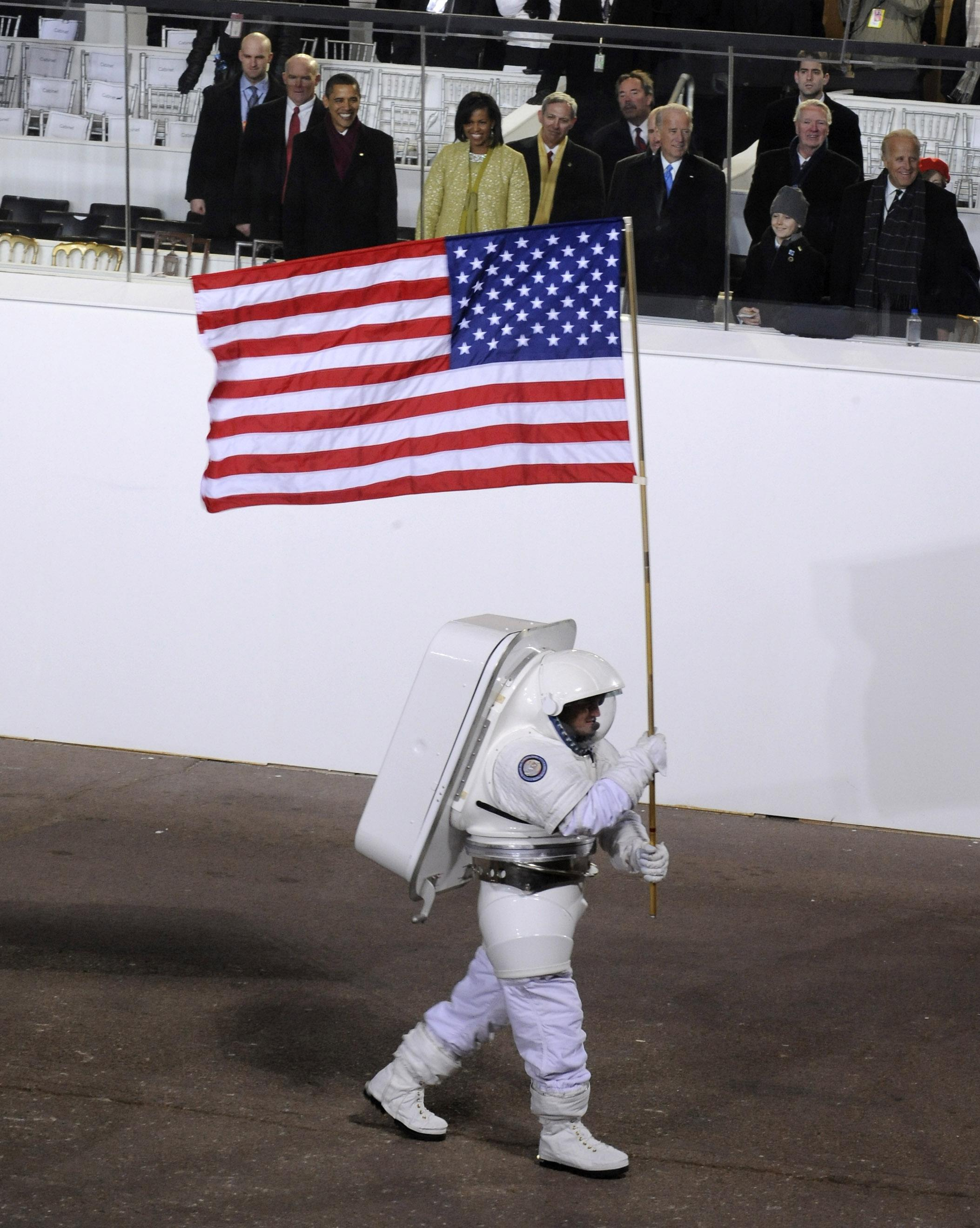
Walheim represented space exploration in an astronaut suit as he passed the Obama and Biden families in the reviewing stand for their 2009 inaugural parade.

== NASA career ==
Walheim served as a flight controller and operations engineer at the Johnson Space Center from October 1986 to January 1989. He was selected by NASA as an astronaut candidate in March 1996 and reported to the Johnson Space Center in August 1996. Having completed two years of training and evaluation, he was qualified for flight assignment as a mission specialist. Initially, Walheim was assigned technical duties in the Astronaut Office Space Station Operations Branch. Walheim flew three flights, STS-110, STS-122 and STS-135, the final flight of the shuttle, logging over 566 hours in space, including over 36 hours and 23 minutes of EVA time. After his first flight, he was assigned to the EVA branch, where he served as the astronaut office representative for the Extra Vehicular Mobility Unit (the EVA spacesuit).

In September 2002, Walheim served as an aquanaut on the joint NASA-NOAA NEEMO 4 expedition (NASA Extreme Environment Mission Operations), an exploration research mission held in Aquarius, the world's only undersea research laboratory, four miles off shore from Key Largo. Walheim and his crewmates spent five days saturation diving from the Aquarius habitat as a space analogue for working and training under extreme environmental conditions. The mission was delayed due to Hurricane Isadore, forcing National Undersea Research Center managers to shorten it to an underwater duration of five days. Then, three days into their underwater mission, the crew members were told that Tropical Storm Lili was headed in their direction and to prepare for an early departure from Aquarius. However, Lili degenerated to the point where it was no longer a threat, so the crew was able to remain the full five days.

During the inauguration of Barack Obama on January 20, 2009, in Washington, D.C., Walheim marched in the parade carrying an American flag and wearing a prototype of NASA's next generation spacesuit.

=== STS-110 ===
Walheim served as mission specialist 1 on STS-110. STS-110 delivered the S0 truss segment to the International Space Station (ISS). Walheim conducted two spacewalks to install the S0 truss and reconfigure Canadarm2 for use on S0, spending 14 hours and 15 minutes outside the ISS. STS-110 lasted 10 days, 19 hours, 43 minutes and 38 seconds.

=== STS-122 ===
Walheim served as mission specialist 2 and was the flight engineer for STS-122. STS-122, which was a 12-day, 18-hour flight, delivered the European-built Columbus module to the ISS for the European Space Agency (ESA). Walheim conducted three spacewalks, totaling 22 hours and 8 minutes.

=== STS-135 ===
Walheim served as mission specialist 2 on the final flight of the Space Shuttle, STS-135, a thirteen-day mission to the International Space Station. The mission launched on July 8, 2011, and landed on July 21.

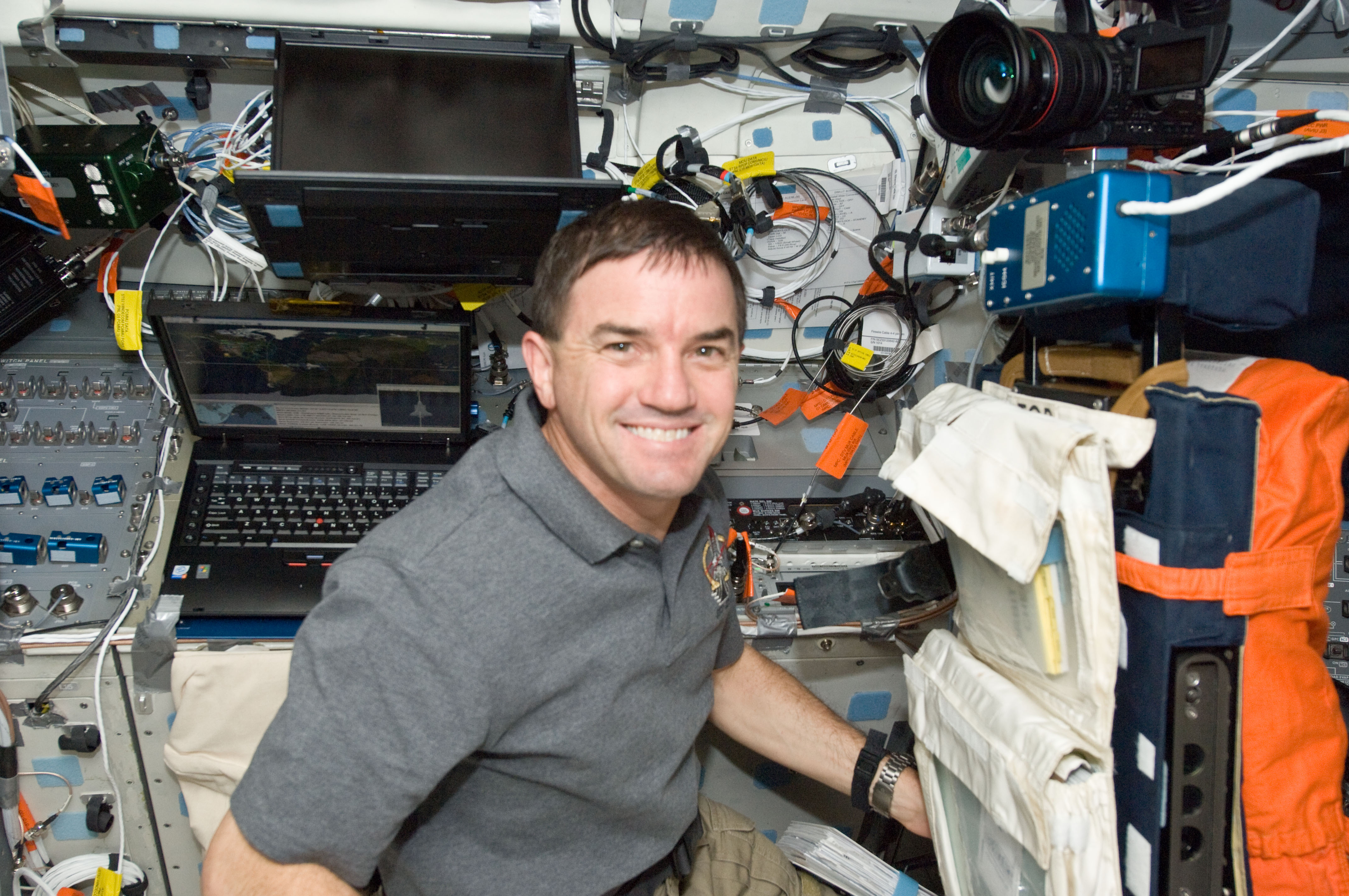
Walheim on the flight deck of Space Shuttle Atlantis during the STS-135 mission.

Rex Walheim retired from NASA August 2020.

== Personal life ==
Walheim is married to Margie Dotson, formerly of Villa Park, California. They have two children. He enjoys snow skiing, hiking, softball and football. His father, Lawrence M. Walheim, Jr., resides in Visalia, California. His mother, Avis L. Walheim, is deceased.

== Awards and honors ==
- Distinguished Graduate, Reserve Officers Training Corps, University of California, Berkeley
- Distinguished Graduate and top flight test engineer in USAF Test Pilot School Class 92A
- Meritorious Service Medal
- Air Force Commendation Medals (2)
- Aerial Achievement Medal
- 20th member of the "Rex Streak" on the Jim Rome radio show. Rome dubbed him "King of the Rexes"
