= Lee Morin =

American astronaut and Navy captain (born 1952)

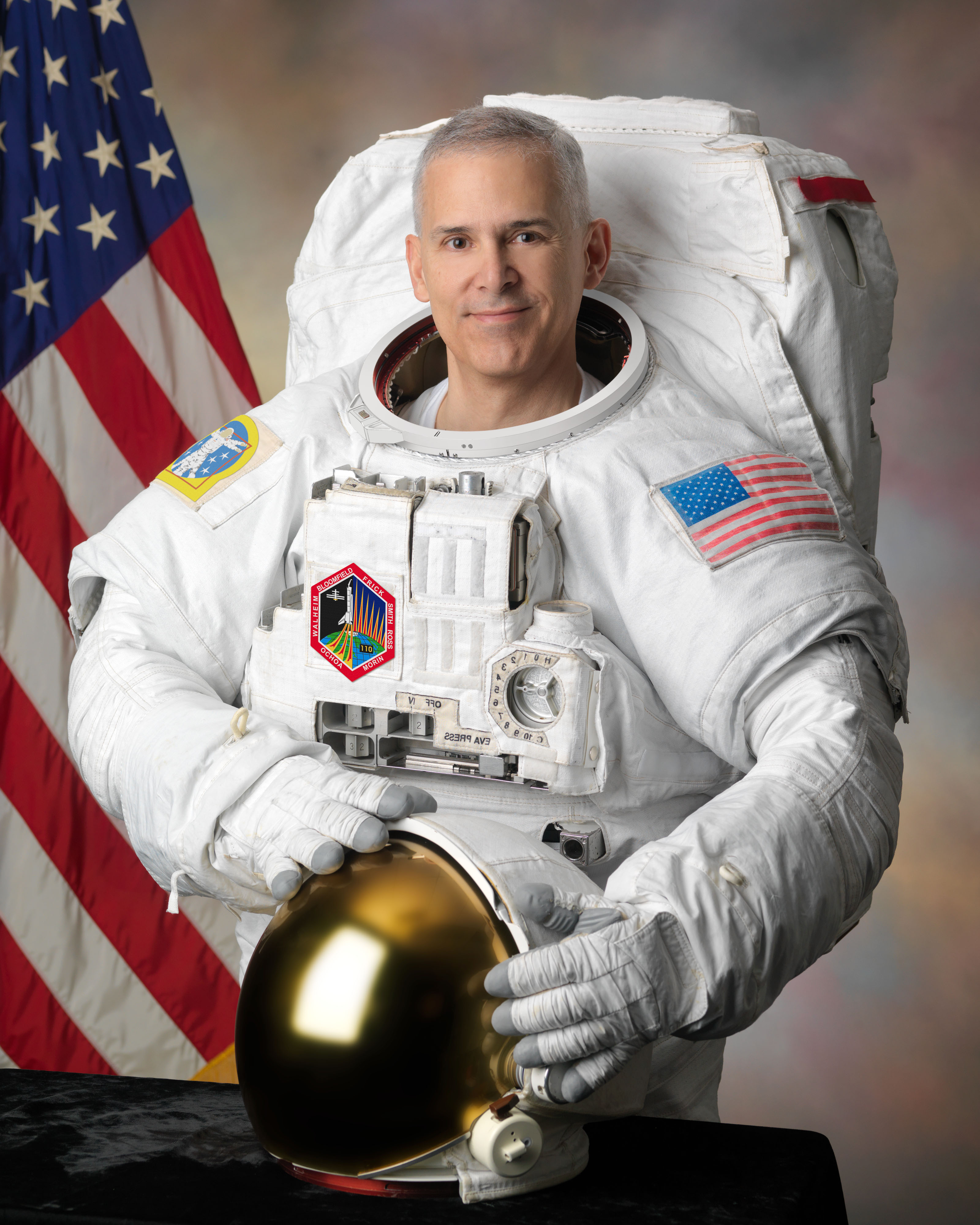
- Born: Lee Miller Emile Morin; September 9, 1952 (age 74); Manchester, New Hampshire, U.S.
- Education: University of New Hampshire (BS); New York University (MS, MD, PhD); University of Alabama, Birmingham (MPH); University of Houston (MS)
- Space career

NASA astronaut
- Rank: Captain, USN
- Time in space: 10d 19h 42m
- Selection: NASA Group 16 (1996)
- Total EVAs: 2
- Total EVA time: 14h, 7m
- Missions: STS-110
- Retired: December 18, 2025
- Scientific career
- Fields: Microbiology
- Thesis: Synthetic Deoxyoligonucleotides and Prophage (ø80) Induction (1981)

Lee Miller Emile Morin (born September 9, 1952) is a retired United States Navy captain and NASA astronaut. He flew on STS-110 in 2002. He is the most formally educated astronaut with six academic degrees along with astronaut Story Musgrave.

== Personal data ==
Born in Manchester, New Hampshire, Morin is married with two children and three grandchildren. An amateur machinist, he enjoys math and jogging.

== Education ==
- 1970: Graduated from the Western Reserve Academy, Hudson, Ohio
- 1974: Received a Bachelor of Science degree in Mathematical/Electrical science from the University of New Hampshire
- 1978: Received a Master of Science degree in Biochemistry from New York University
- 1981: Received a Doctorate of Medicine degree from New York University School of Medicine
- 1982: Received a Doctorate of Microbiology degree from New York University
- 1988: Received a Master of Public Health degree from the University of Alabama at Birmingham
- 2008: Received a Master in Science degree in Physics from the University of Houston Clear Lake

== Organizations ==
- Aerospace Medical Association
- Force Recon Association
- Undersea and Hyperbaric Medical Society
- Society of United States Naval Flight Surgeons.

== Awards ==
- Meritorious Service Medal
- Navy Commendation Medal
- Navy Achievement Medal
- Navy Unit Commendation
- Meritorious Unit Commendation (two awards)
- Overseas Service Ribbon
- National Defense Service Medal
- Kuwait Liberation Medal (Kuwait)
- Southwest Asia Service Medal
- Expert Pistol Medal
- Expert Rifle Medal

== Badges ==
Captain Morin has been awarded the following US Navy Badges: US Navy Astronaut Wings aboard STS-110 US Navy Flight Medical Office's Wings while at Naval Aerospace Medical Institute in Pensacola, Florida US Navy Diving Officer's Badge and US Navy Submarine Medical Officer's Badge while serving aboard the USS Henry M. Jackson (SSBN-730)

== Special honors ==
- Recipient of the 1994 Chairman of the Joint Chiefs of Staff Award for Excellence in Military Medicine (also known as the Fisher Award)
- Finalist of the 1995 Innovations in American Government Award from the John F. Kennedy School of Government at Harvard University and the Ford Foundation
- Received the 1996 Sustaining Membership Lecture Award for the Association of Military Surgeons of the United States.

== Experience ==
After graduating from the University of New Hampshire in 1974, Morin worked at the Massachusetts Institute of Technology in the laboratory now known as the Media Lab. Morin matriculated at New York University School of Medicine in 1974, received a Master of Science in Biochemistry in 1978, an M.D. in 1981, and a Ph.D. in Microbiology in 1982. He then completed two years of residency training in General Surgery at the Bronx Municipal Hospital Center and at Montefiore Medical Center in The Bronx, New York City.

In 1982, Morin received a Direct Commission in the U.S. Naval Reserve. In 1983, he entered active duty and attended the Naval Undersea Medical Institute in Groton, Connecticut. He was designated as an Undersea Medical Officer in 1983. He joined the crew of the submarine USS Henry M. Jackson at the Electric Boat Company Shipyards in Groton. He remained aboard as Medical Officer for both Blue and Gold crews until 1985 when the ship arrived at its home port in Bangor, Washington. During his tour aboard Henry M. Jackson, Morin qualified as a Diving Medical Officer, and also received his "Dolphins" as a qualified Submarine Medical Officer.

Morin then entered Flight Surgeon training at the Naval Aerospace Medical Institute (NAMI) in Pensacola, Florida. He received his "Wings of Gold" as a Naval Flight Surgeon in 1986, and remained on the staff at NAMI as Flight Surgeon/Diving Medal Officer until 1989. While at NAMI, he received his Masters of Public Health degree from the University of Alabama at Birmingham. He then left active duty and entered private practice in occupational medicine in Jacksonville, Florida. He remained in the Naval Reserve, and drilled with the United States Marine Corps' 3rd Force Reconnaissance Company in Mobile, Alabama.

In August 1990, he was recalled to active duty during Operation Desert Shield, when he was assigned to Branch Clinic, Naval Air Station Pensacola as a Flight Surgeon. Morin volunteered to reenter active duty, and was assigned to Administrative Support Unit, Bahrain, as Diving Medical Officer/Flight Surgeon during Operation Desert Storm and during the post-war build-down period.

In 1992, Morin rejoined the staff at NAMI, initially as Special Projects Officer. He was named the Director of Warfare Specialty Programs when NAMI became Naval Aerospace and Operational Medical Institute (NAOMI). In 1995, Morin entered the Residency in Aerospace Medicine at the Naval Aerospace and Operational Medical Institute. He completed the residency in 1996.

== NASA ==
Selected as an astronaut candidate by NASA in April 1996, Morin reported to the Johnson Space Center in August 1996. Having completed two years of training and evaluation, he was qualified for flight assignment as a mission specialist. Initially Morin was assigned technical duties in the Astronaut Office Computer Support Branch, followed by the Astronaut Office Advanced Vehicles Branch. He served a one-year tour with the U.S. State Department, where he was Deputy Assistant Secretary for Health, Space, and Science. He was assigned to the Exploration Branch of the Astronaut Office. He led the rapid prototyping of the cockpit for the new Orion spacecraft, and served as deputy lead of the Orion Cockpit Working Group, specializing in avionics displays and ergonomics. Morin served on the EVA crew of STS-110 (2002) and has logged over 259 hours in space, including over 14 EVA hours.

As of 2021, Morin was a management astronaut, which means he was no longer eligible for flight assignment. NASA announced his retirement on December 18, 2025.

== Space flight experience ==
STS-110 Atlantis (April 8–19, 2002) was the 13th Space Shuttle mission to visit the International Space Station. Mission milestones included: the delivery and installation of the SO (S-Zero) Truss; the first time the station's robotic arm was used to maneuver spacewalkers around the station; and the first time that all of a shuttle crew's spacewalks were based from the station's Quest Airlock. Morin performed 2 EVAs totaling 14 hours and 9 minutes. The crew prepared the station for future spacewalks and spent a week in joint operations with the station's Expedition 4 crew. Mission duration was 10 days, 19 hours and 42 minutes.
