= Jens Martin Knudsen =

Danish astrophysicist (1930–2005)

- Born: 12 October 1930; Haurum, Denmark
- Died: 17 February 2005 (aged 74)
- Education: University of Copenhagen
- Scientific career
- Fields: Astrophysics

Jens Martin Knudsen (12 October 1930 – 17 February 2005) was a Danish astrophysicist. During his scientific career Knudsen authored or co-authored more than 100 scientific articles, and was a longtime advisor to NASA.

== Early years ==
Knudsen was born in Haurum near Aarhus, Denmark. Knudsen was son of Haurum's grocers and grew up at the grocer's house together with his three brothers of whom Knudsen was the oldest. All of the brothers ended up becoming physicists.

== Physics ==
He was originally educated as a school teacher, but in 1962 got his degree in physics and mathematics from the University of Copenhagen. Immediately after his degree, Knudsen received a job invitation to MIT where he spent the next two years as a guest teacher.

During 1966–1967 he taught physics at Middle East Technical University in Ankara Turkey. From 1970 to 1973, he worked for UNESCO as a teacher of mathematics in Turkey and later in Brazil. In Universidade de Brasília Knudsen worked with Mössbauer spectroscopy. There in Brazil Knudsen got a direct opportunity to compare the color of Mars in the night sky with the color of the local terrain. It made him wonder if there were common reasons for the near-matched color.

After Knudsen returned to Denmark, he concentrated his studies on meteorites, especially iron-rich meteorites where Mössbauer spectroscopy is especially effective.

In 1990 Knudsen participated in a workshop called "The Environmental Model of Mars" in Hungary. One morning Knudsen had sat down at the morning table at the workshop and started an enthusiastic conversation about why Mars exploration is especially important with two people unknown to him; it turned out that they were Agustin Chicarro, who was ESA's Solar System Research Project Scientist and leading and George Scoon, the chief designer of ESA's orbiter probes.

Both were thrilled about Knudsen's rhetoric and invited him to join a science team for a European probe to Mars. In one of these meetings, two people from JPL heard Knudsen talk about Mössbauer spectroscopy. Shortly after, they invited him to JPL to talk about Mössbauer spectroscopy in a future Mars mission. At that conference in California, Knudsen used the last five minutes and 45 seconds of his talk to present the idea of using an array of magnets with decreasing field strength as a sort of continuation on the magnetic experiment carried out on the Viking lander missions. This idea intrigued the conference and Knudsen was asked whom they should talk to implement such an experiment: Knudsen said that he would call Robert B. Hargraves, who had been Principal Investigator in the "Magnetic Properties Experiment" on the Viking mission. Thanks to Knudsen the development, of the magnet array experiment was granted to the University of Copenhagen.

In 1993, Knudsen became part of NASA's Mars team and shortly thereafter Knudsen established the Danish Mars Group together with Lise Vistisen and Morten Bo Madsen.

Knudsen had a part in the development of the Danish magnet experiment carried on the Mars Pathfinder mission in 1996 which was meant to examine the magnetic properties of the Martian dust.

== Later years ==
In later years he became known as "Marsmanden" (the Martian) on account of his great enthusiasm towards recent missions to the planet Mars. In 2000 Knudsen was awarded the Order of the Dannebrog In 2002 he was appointed Honorary Professor of Planetary science at the University of Aarhus. At his death he was also Professor Emeritus at the Niels Bohr Institute, University of Copenhagen.

In 2003 Jens Kerte wrote a biography of Knudsen entitled Mars og Marsmanden (Mars and the Martian) which includes three interviews with Knudsen himself.

Knudsen was highly regarded by his students, and is subject of many colloquial songs written by the physics students at the University of Copenhagen which are still sung regularly. After Knudsen's death in 2005 the students wrote a more formal song in his honor, and to this date, the annual student's revue (end-of-year show) reserves the first printed ticket for Jens Martin.

This same regard has led to the prize for most well-taught physics course at the Niels Bohr Institute to be named the Jens Martin Prize.

== See also ==
- 5427 Jensmartin, an asteroid named after Jens Martin Knudsen
- Danish Astronautical Society, a society that Jens Martin Knudsen has been appointed an honorary member of
