= Yvonne Cagle =

American astronaut and manager (born 1959)

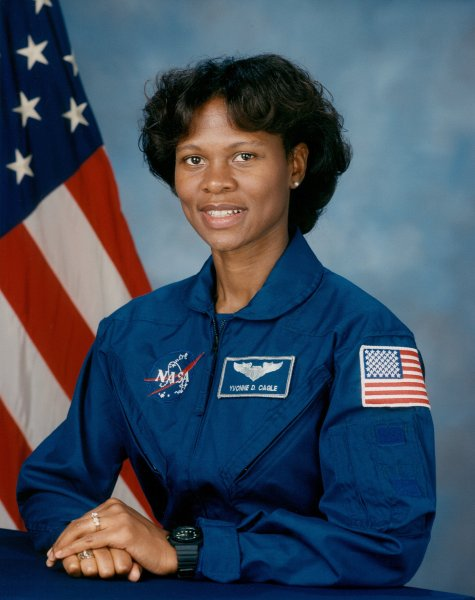
- Cagle in 2004
- Born: Yvonne Darlene Cagle; April 24, 1959 (age 67); West Point, New York, U.S.
- Education: San Francisco State University (BS); University of Washington (MD)
- Space career

NASA astronaut
- Rank: Brigadier General (United States), USAF
- Selection: NASA Group 16 (1996)
- Retired: 2008

Yvonne Darlene Cagle (born April 24, 1959) is an American physician, professor, retired U.S. Air Force brigadier general, and NASA astronaut. Cagle joined NASA as an astronaut in 1996. She is one of six African American woman astronauts.

== Education ==
Born in West Point, New York, Yvonne Cagle graduated from Novato High School in Novato, California. She received her bachelor's degree in biochemistry from San Francisco State University in 1981, and a doctor of medicine degree from the University of Washington in 1985. She completed a transitional internship at Highland General Hospital in Oakland, California in 1985 and received a certificate in Aerospace Medicine from the School of Aerospace Medicine at Brooks Air Force Base, Texas, in 1988. She then went on to complete a residency in family practice at Ghent FP at Eastern Virginia Medical School in 1992 and received certification as a senior aviation medical examiner from the Federal Aviation Administration in 1995.

== U.S. Air Force ==
Cagle retired from the United States Air Force with the rank of Colonel in 2008. In May 1989 as a commissioned medical officer assigned to the 48th Tactical Hospital, United Kingdom, Cagle served as Air Force Medical Liaison Officer for STS-30 mission to test the Magellan spacecraft, before she became a NASA astronaut. She worked as medical doctor at NASA's Occupational Health Clinic from 1994 to 1996. In 1996 she was selected for astronaut training by NASA.

== Astronaut career ==
Yvonne Cagle was a member of the Astronaut Class of 1996 (NASA Astronaut Group 16).

In 2013, she was selected as part of the reserve crew for Hawai'i Space Exploration Analog and Simulation (HI-SEAS), which is part of a study for NASA to determine the best way to keep astronauts well nourished during multiple-year missions to Mars or the moon.

In 2014, Cagle was a visiting professor to Fordham University where she participated in interdisciplinary research in health, environment and human performance. She was awarded an honorary Ph.D. by Fordham University for significant contributions to the fields of science, technology, and human health.

Cagle never flew on a space mission, and by June 2017 was deemed a NASA Management Astronaut, which means that she is employed at NASA but is no longer eligible for spaceflight assignments; she still appears on the active list of NASA Management Astronauts as of January 2021, assigned to NASA's Ames Research Center in Mountain View, California.

She was on the faculty of Singularity University and still serves as their NASA liaison for exploration and space development.

Dr. Cagle is an honorary member of the Danish Astronautical Society.

Cagle is the chief scientist for the Level II Program Office of NASA's Commercial Reusable Suborbital Research program, an advisor for NASA's Flight Opportunities Program (originally named CRuSR – Commercial Reusable Suborbital Research Program), and Stanford University's lead astronaut science liaison and strategic relationships manager to technology companies, including Google.

== Post-NASA career ==
Cagle served as the VP for space exploration and space exponential technologies at Singularity University and acted as a visiting professor at Fordham University. She holds adjunct professorships with Stanford University, UC Davis, and UTMB, Galveston.

== Awards and honors ==
Cagle has received numerous awards and recognition including:

- Outstanding Young Women of America
- National Defense Service Medal
- Air Force Achievement Medal
- U.S. Air Force Air Staff Exceptional Physician Commendation
- National Technical Association Distinguished Scientist Award
- Commendation Marin County Board of Supervisors
- Commendation Novato School Board
- Honorary Ph.D. in Humanities, Fordham University
- Honorary appointment, University of Wisconsin-Madison

== Other ==
In 2017, she brought Katherine Johnson onto the stage at the Academy Awards.

Cagle was a TEDx speaker in 2018 on the subject of "Poetry of space on Earth".

== See also ==
- List of African-American astronauts
- HI-SEAS
