= Morten Bo Madsen =

Danish physicist

- Born: 30 May 1957 (age 69); Gørding, Denmark
- Education: Technical University of Denmark
- Known for: Public outreach on Mars research
- Scientific career
- Fields: Physics
- Workplaces: University of Copenhagen

Morten Bo Madsen (born 30 May 1957) is a Danish physicist, associate professor at the Niels Bohr Institute. He was a co-investigator (participating scientist) on the Phoenix Mars mission which proved the presence of water on Mars.

== Early career ==
In 1989, Madsen joined the Mössbauer spectroscopy group led by Jens Martin Knudsen at the University of Copenhagen. During the 1990s, their research focused on studies of the planet Mars and, based on the ideas of "The Martian", Jens Martin Knudsen formed the Danish Mars Group. This soon spurred a sister-group, the Mars Simulation Laboratory, in Århus, an initiative by Erik Uggerhøj and Per Nørnberg.

== Pathfinder Mission 1997 ==
Madsen participated in the design and analysis of the five Danish magnetic properties experiments flown on the 1997 Mars Pathfinder mission. On the mission, patterns of Martian dust formed on the grey plates with built in magnets revealing the magnetic properties of the dust, thus giving hints of the chemical composition of the magnetic component in the dust and geological formation. Knudsen's team was one of the two non-US teams who were working with NASA on the Pathfinder Mission, the other team was German. The results from the magnetic properties experiments showed that there had not been liquid water on the surface of mars for the last 2 billion years.

== Mars Polar Lander 1999 ==
After the success of the Pathfinder mission, Madsen's team continued developing the next generation of magnetic properties experiments for the 1999 Mars Polar Lander mission. Two of the three magnetic properties experiments were identical to the ones flown on the Pathfinder mission. Contact with the Mars Polar Lander was lost on 3 December 1999 during landing of the spacecraft.

== Mars Exploration Rover Mission 2003 ==
Knudsen, Madsen and their research group designed magnetic properties experiments on board each of the two rovers, Spirit and Opportunity, of the 2003 Mars Exploration Rover mission. Three of the magnets were designed to draw airborne magnetic dust from the atmosphere and four small magnets were placed on the arm, built into the Rock Abrasion Tool. They were designed to capture magnetic dust liberated from the Martian rocks during abrasion. The dust was analysed by onboard instruments including cameras using various spectroscopy filters. The results from the magnet experiment was considered a success in that they helped the understanding of how the dust on Mars was composed and built up. Members of the team, including Madsen, were at the control center at the Jet Propulsion Laboratory in Pasadena during the rovers' landing and the first three months of initial data collection.

== Phoenix 2007 ==
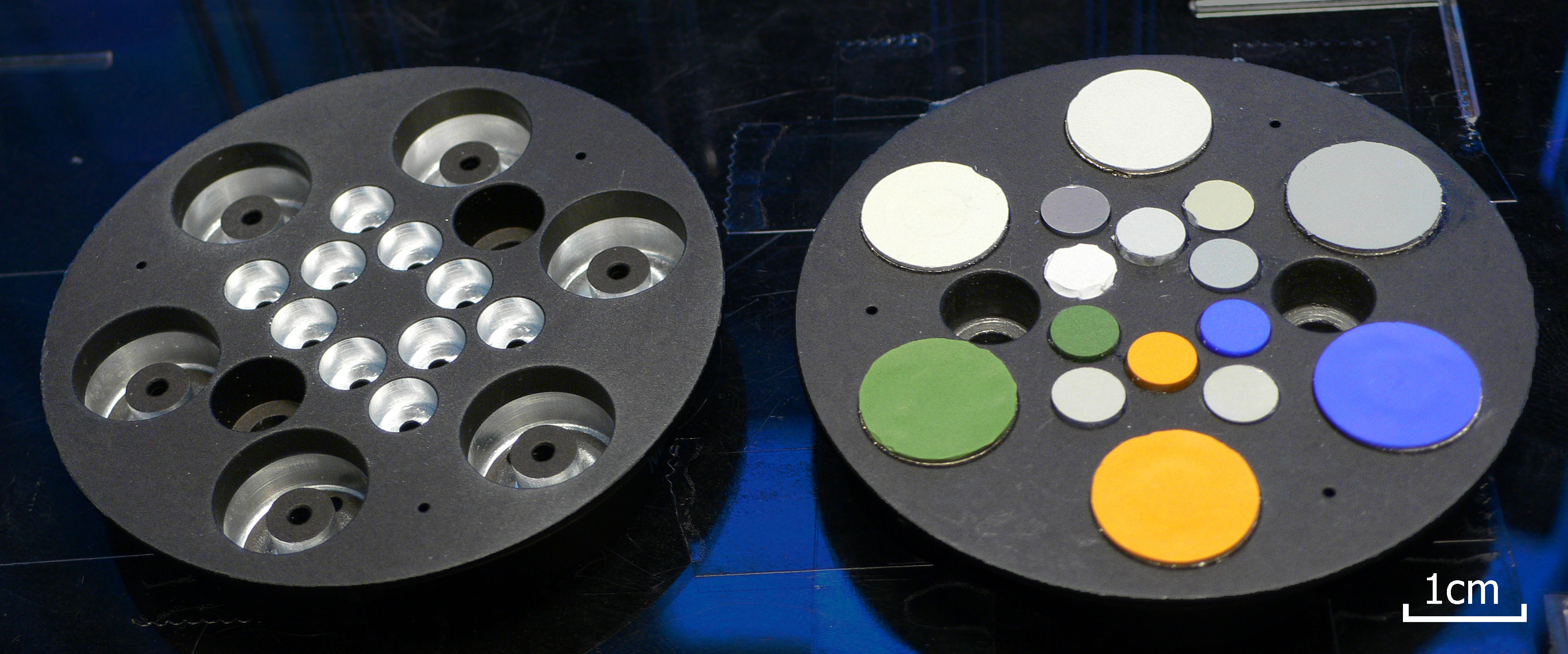
Right: Copy of one of the three Phoenix iSweep color targets designed by Madsen and his research group at the Niels Bohr Institute. Left: The anodized aluminum sample holder without the magnets.

The color calibration target on Mars showing rings of dust accumulation above the ring magnets

In 2007, Madsen's team was invited by NASA to design the three radiometric calibration targets for the Phoenix mission called "Improved Sweep Magnet Experiment" (ISWEEP). The target consisted of an aluminum holder (carrying structure) containing a palette of different calibrated colors of synthetic pigmented rubber with "sweeping magnets" underneath to clear the colored material of the magnetic Martian dust, assisting in calibrating the cameras of the mission
