= STS-110 =

2002 American crewed spaceflight to the ISS

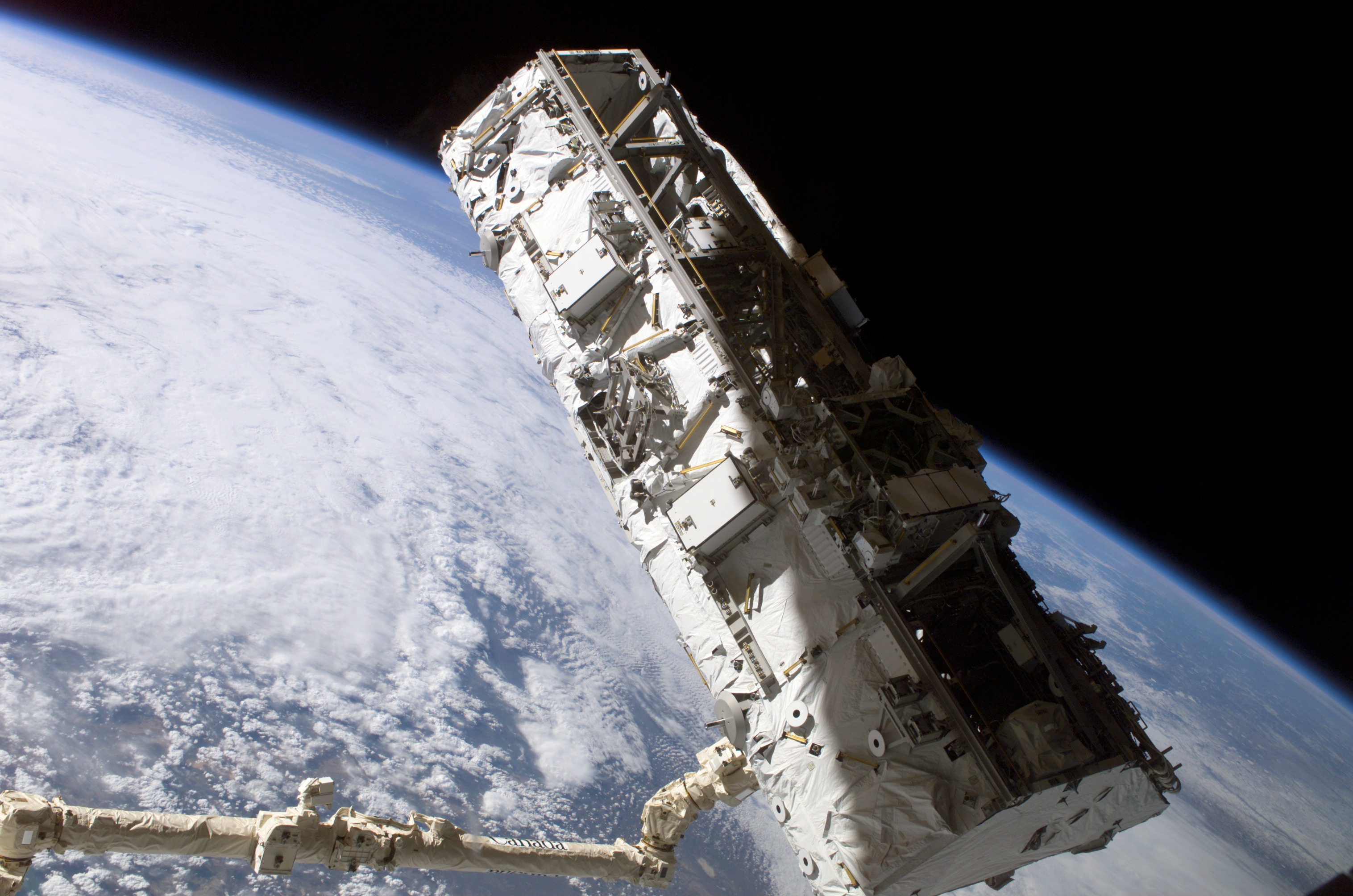
- Canadarm2 grapples the first segment of the ISS' Integrated Truss Structure.
- Names: Space Transportation System-110
- Mission type: ISS assembly
- Operator: NASA
- COSPAR ID: 2002-018A
- SATCAT no.: 27413
- Mission duration: 10 days, 19 hours, 43 minutes, 38 seconds
- Distance travelled: 7,240,000 kilometers (4,500,000 mi)
- Orbits completed: 171

Spacecraft properties
- Spacecraft: Space Shuttle Atlantis
- Launch mass: 116,609 kilograms (257,079 lb)
- Landing mass: 91,016 kilograms (200,657 lb)
- Payload mass: 13,132 kilograms (28,951 lb)

Crew
- Crew size: 7
- Members: Michael J. Bloomfield; Stephen N. Frick; Rex J. Walheim; Ellen L. Ochoa; Lee M. E. Morin; Jerry L. Ross; Steven L. Smith

Start of mission
- Launch date: 8 April 2002 20:44:19 UTC
- Launch site: Kennedy, LC-39B

End of mission
- Landing date: 19 April 2002 16:26:57 UTC
- Landing site: Kennedy, SLF Runway 33

Orbital parameters
- Reference system: Geocentric
- Regime: Low Earth
- Perigee altitude: 155 kilometres (96 mi)
- Apogee altitude: 225 kilometres (140 mi)
- Inclination: 51.6 degrees
- Period: 88.3 minutes

Docking with ISS
- Docking port: PMA-2 (Destiny forward)
- Docking date: 10 April 2002 16:05 UTC
- Undocking date: 17 April 2002 18:31 UTC
- Time docked: 7 days, 2 hours, 26 minutes
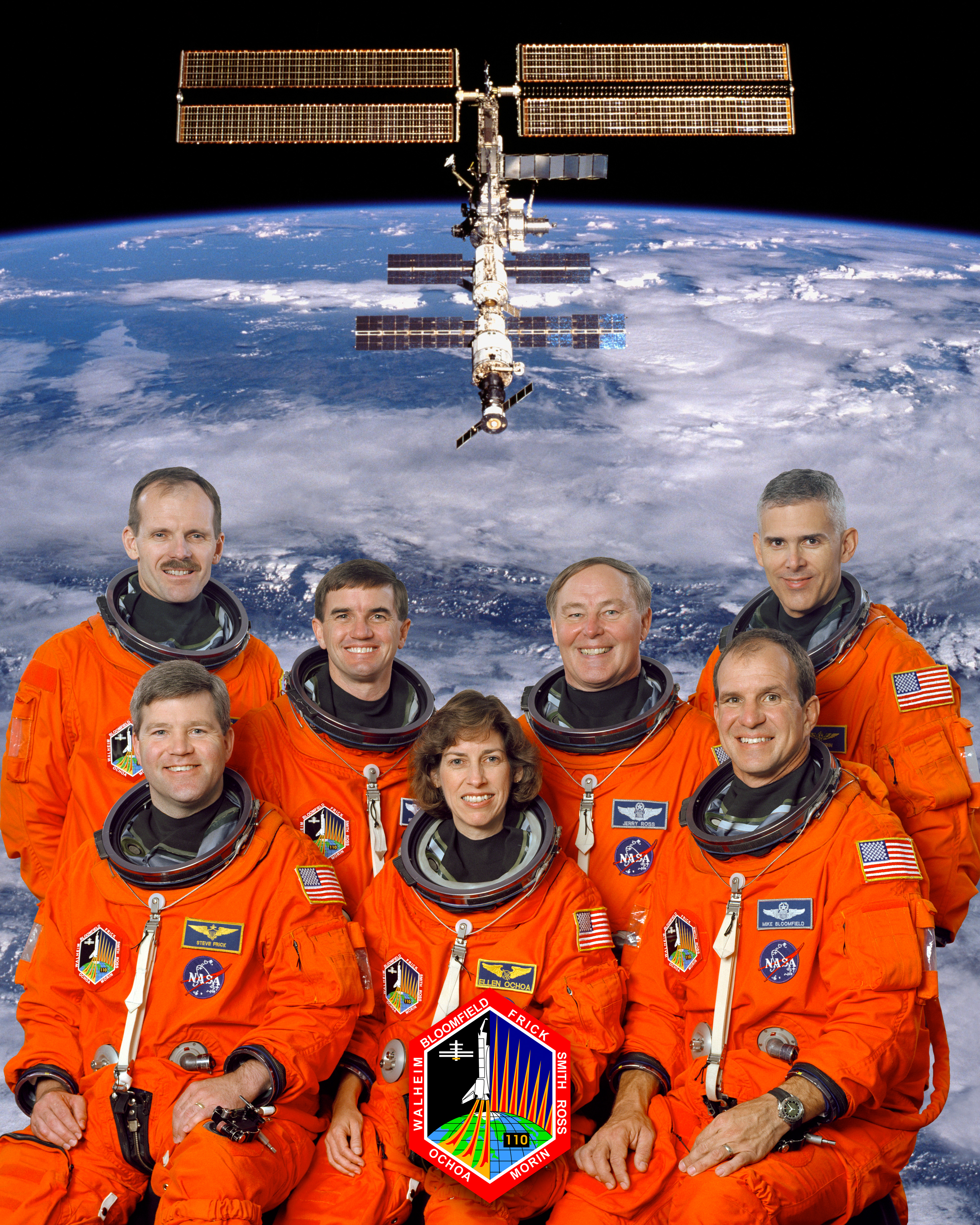
- In front, (L-R): Stephen N. Frick, Ellen L. Ochoa, Michael J. Bloomfield; In the back, (L-R): Steven L. Smith, Rex J. Walheim, Jerry L. Ross and Lee M. E. Morin. Space Shuttle program

STS-110 was a Space Shuttle mission to the International Space Station (ISS) on 8–19 April 2002 flown by Space Shuttle Atlantis. The main purpose was to install the S0 Truss segment, which forms the backbone of the truss structure on the station.

== Crew ==
Position	Astronaut
Commander	Michael J. Bloomfield; Third and last spaceflight
Pilot	Stephen N. Frick; First spaceflight
Mission Specialist 1	Rex J. Walheim; First spaceflight
Mission Specialist 2 Flight Engineer	Ellen L. Ochoa; Fourth and last spaceflight
Mission Specialist 3	Lee M. E. Morin; Only spaceflight
Mission Specialist 4	Jerry L. Ross; Seventh and last spaceflight
Mission Specialist 5	Steven L. Smith; Fourth and last spaceflight

== Mission highlights ==
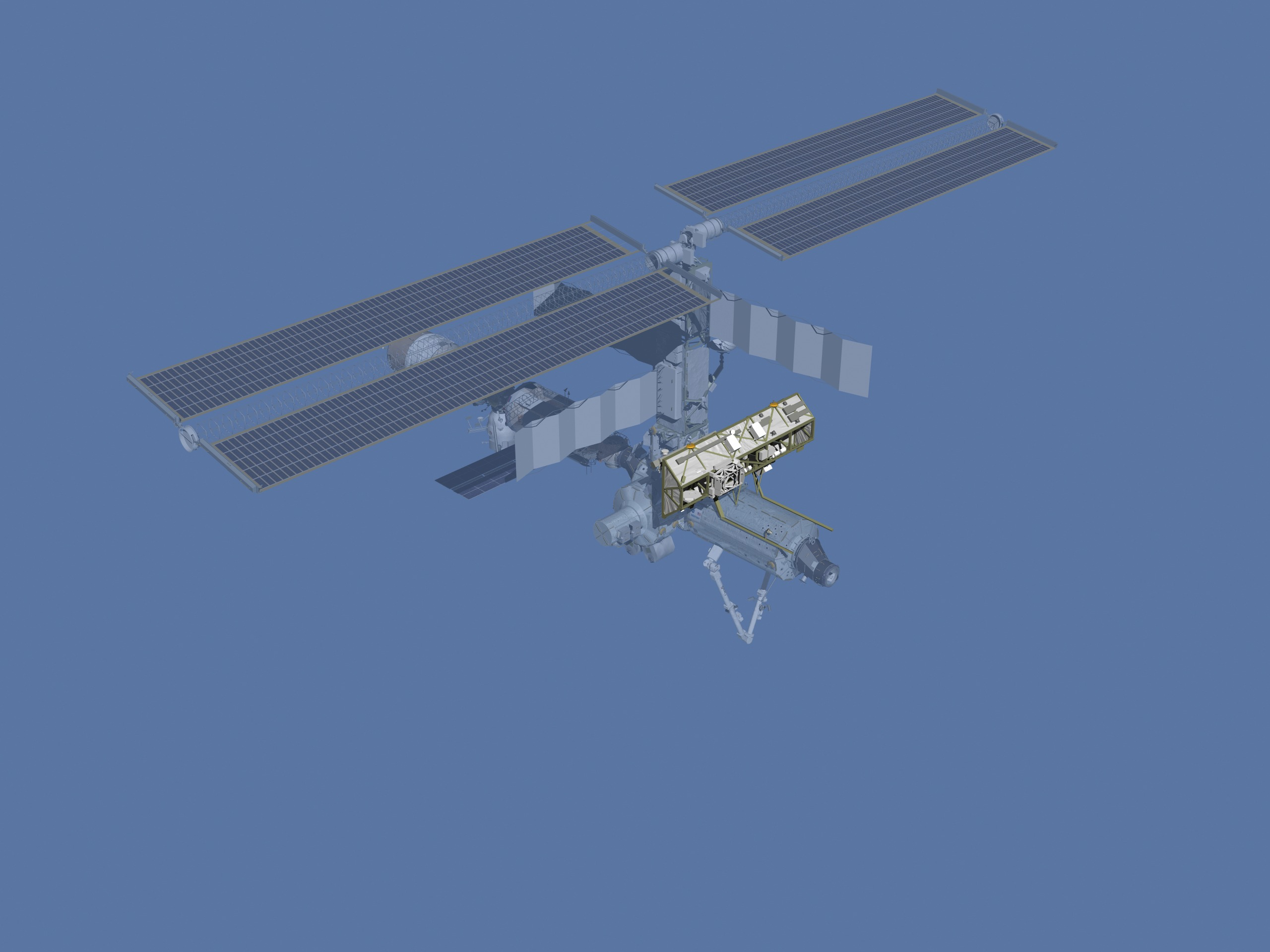
Illustration of the International Space Station after STS-110

The main purpose of STS-110 was to attach the stainless steel S0 Truss segment to the International Space Station (ISS) to the Destiny Laboratory Module. It forms the backbone of the station to which the S1 and P1 truss segments were attached (on the following missions STS-112 and STS-113, respectively).

STS-110 also delivered the Mobile Transporter (MT), which is an 885-kilogram (1,951 lb) assembly that glides down rails on the station integrated trusses. The MT was designed and manufactured by Astro Aerospace in Carpinteria, CA. During the next shuttle mission, STS-111, the Mobile Base System (MBS) was mounted to the MT. This Mobile Servicing System (MSS) allows the Canadarm2 to travel down the length of the installed truss structure.

=== Flight Day 1: Launch ===
After a launch scrub on 4 April 2002 due to a hydrogen leak, Space Shuttle Atlantis successfully launched on 8 April 2002, from Launch Complex 39B. The countdown on 8 April encountered an unscheduled hold at the T−5-minute mark due to data dropouts in a backup Launch Processing System. The Launch Processing System team reloaded the required data and the countdown resumed. Liftoff occurred with 11 seconds remaining in the launch window.

STS-110 was the first shuttle mission to feature the upgraded Block II main engines, which featured an "improved fuel pump...a stronger integral shaft/disk, and more robust bearings". The intent of the upgrade was to increase the flight capacity of the engines, while increasing reliability and safety.

With the launch of Atlantis, mission specialist Jerry Ross became the first human to have traveled to space seven times.

Attempt	Planned	Result	Turnaround	Reason	Decision point	Weather go (%)	Notes
1	4 Apr 2002, 5:17:51 pm	Scrubbed	—	Technical	4 Apr 2002, 9:27 am	60%	Leak developed in a hydrogen fuel vent line.
2	8 Apr 2002, 4:44:19 pm	Success	3 days 23 hours 26 minutes			60%	

=== Crew seat assignments ===
Seat	Launch	Landing	Seats 1–4 are on the flight deck. Seats 5–7 are on the mid-deck.
1	Bloomfield		Seats 1–4 are on the flight deck. Seats 5–7 are on the mid-deck.
2	Frick		Seats 1–4 are on the flight deck. Seats 5–7 are on the mid-deck.
3	Walheim	Morin	Seats 1–4 are on the flight deck. Seats 5–7 are on the mid-deck.
4	Ochoa		Seats 1–4 are on the flight deck. Seats 5–7 are on the mid-deck.
5	Morin	Walheim	Seats 1–4 are on the flight deck. Seats 5–7 are on the mid-deck.
6	Ross		Seats 1–4 are on the flight deck. Seats 5–7 are on the mid-deck.
7	Smith		Seats 1–4 are on the flight deck. Seats 5–7 are on the mid-deck.

=== Spacewalks ===
	Mission	Spacewalkers	Start – UTC	End – UTC	Duration	Mission
35.	STS-110; EVA 1	Steven Smith; Rex Walheim	11 April 2002; 14:36	11 April 2002; 22:24	7 h, 48 min	Installed S0 Truss on Destiny
36.	STS-110; EVA 2	Jerry Ross; Lee Morin	13 April 2002; 14:09	13 April 2002; 21:39	7 h, 30 min	Continued S0 Truss install
37.	STS-110; EVA 3	Steven Smith; Rex Walheim	14 April 2002; 13:48	14 April 2002; 20:15	6 h, 27 min	Reconfigure Canadarm2 for S0 truss
38.	STS-110; EVA 4	Jerry Ross; Lee Morin	16 April 2002; 14:29	16 April 2002; 21:06	6 h, 37 min	Install future EVA hardware

== Media ==
Launch video (1 minute 29 seconds)

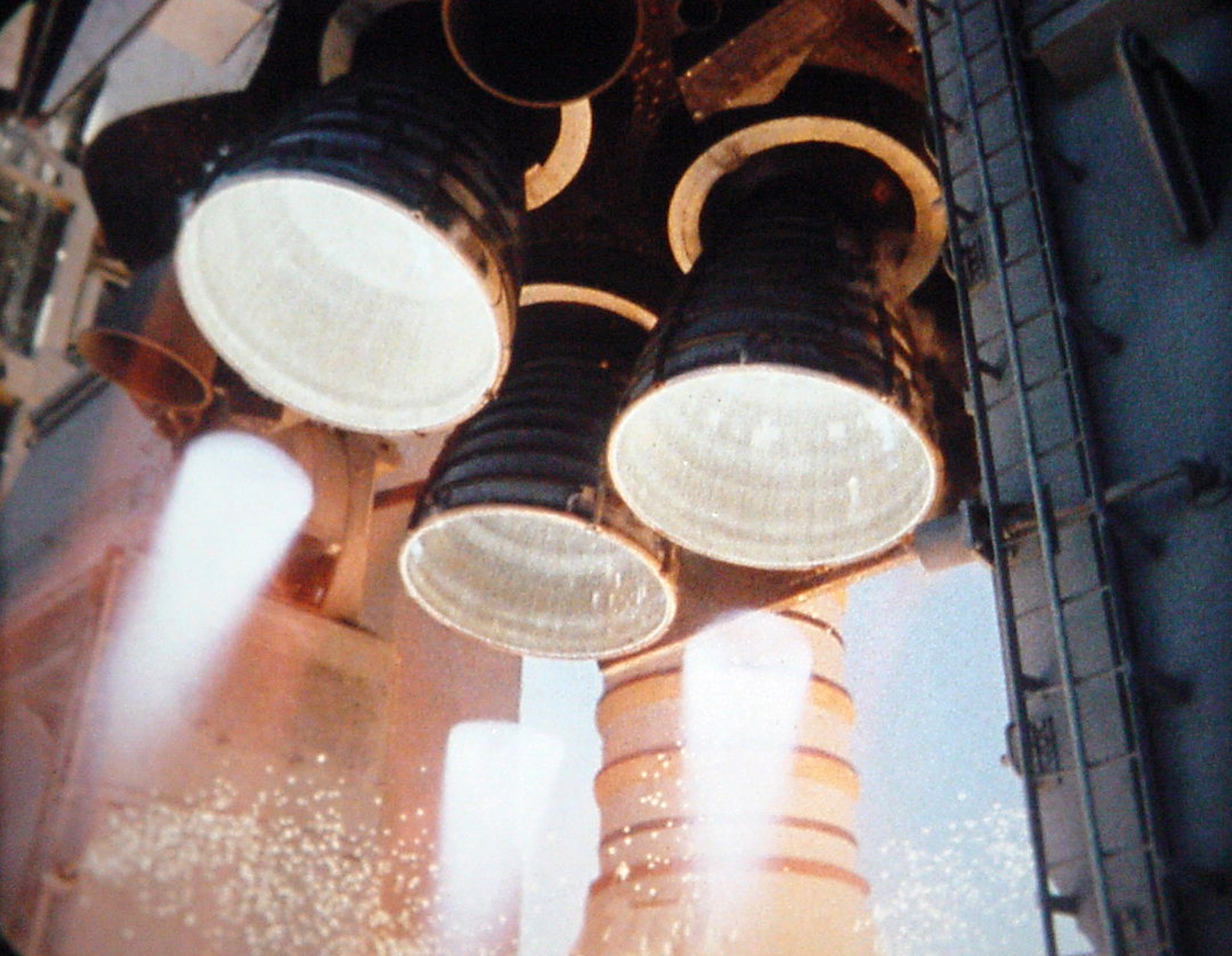
The three newly enhanced Space Shuttle Main Engines ignite to launch Space Shuttle Atlantis, 8 April 2002.

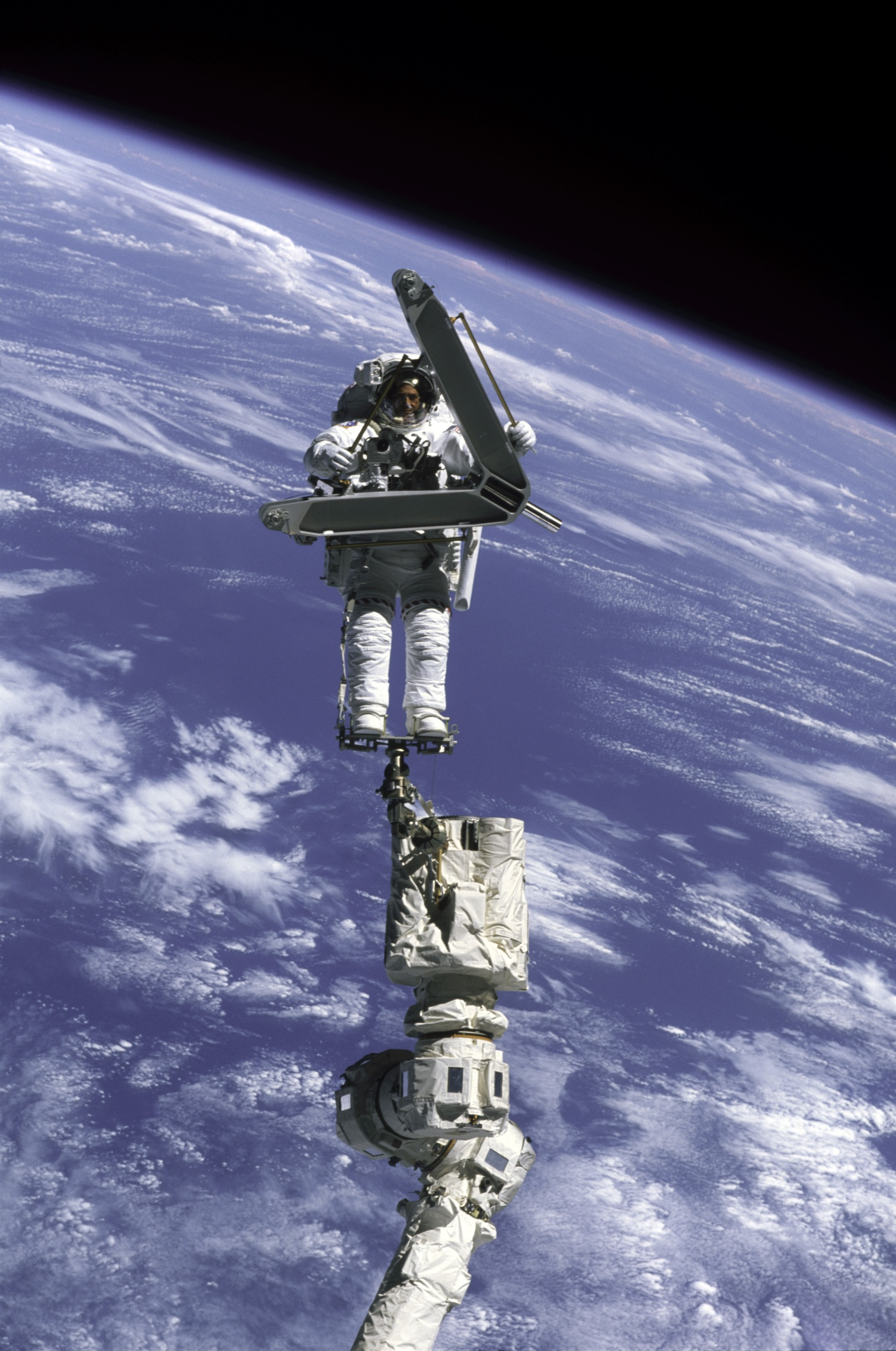
Astronaut Lee Morin on the second spacewalk

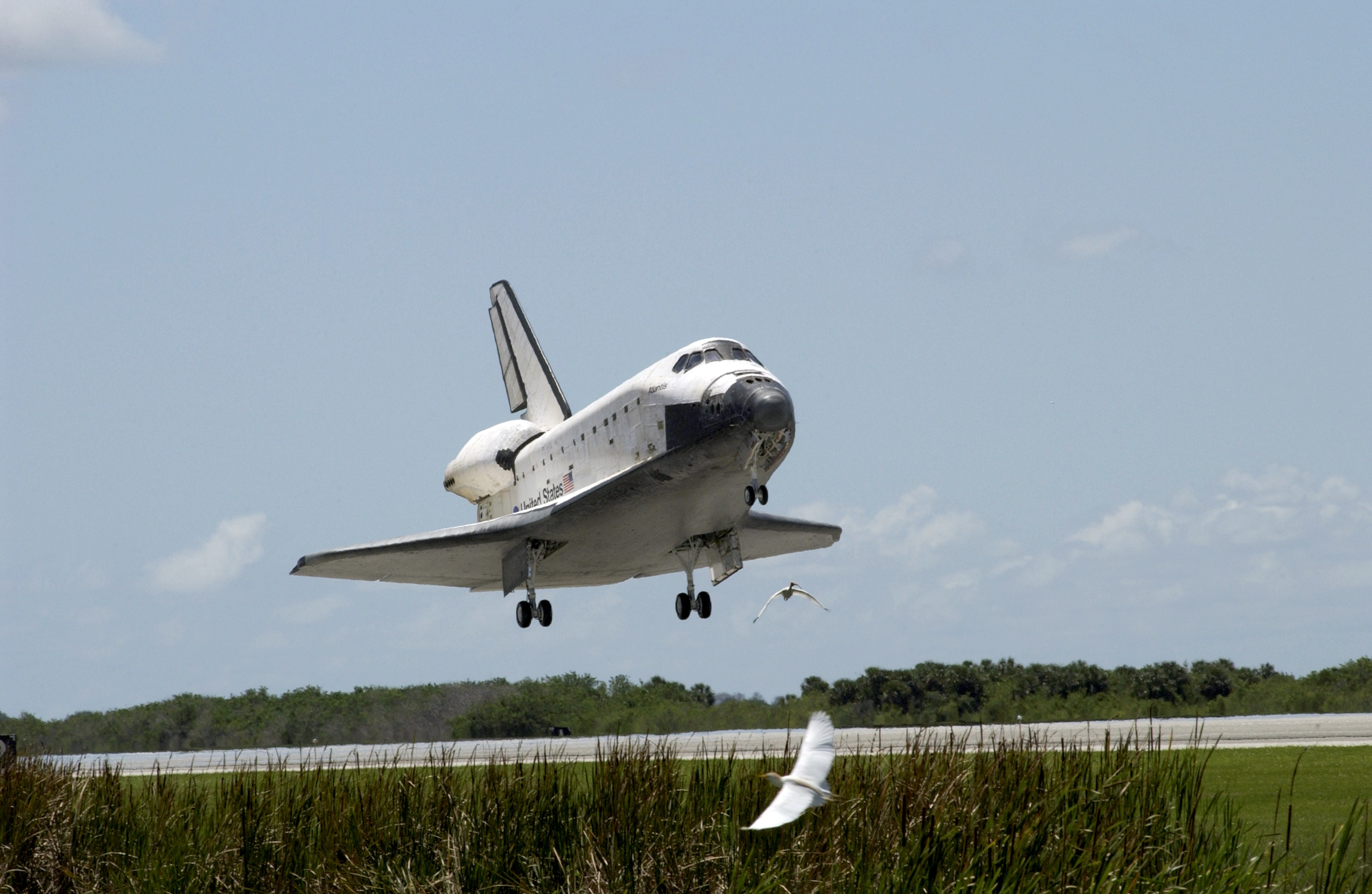
Space Shuttle Atlantis lands at the Shuttle Landing Facility, 19 April 2002.

== See also ==
- List of human spaceflights
- List of International Space Station spacewalks
- List of Space Shuttle missions
- List of spacewalks and moonwalks 1965–1999
- Outline of space science
