= NASA Astronaut Group 10 =

1984 human spaceflight selection of 17 candidates; "The Maggots"

The Maggots
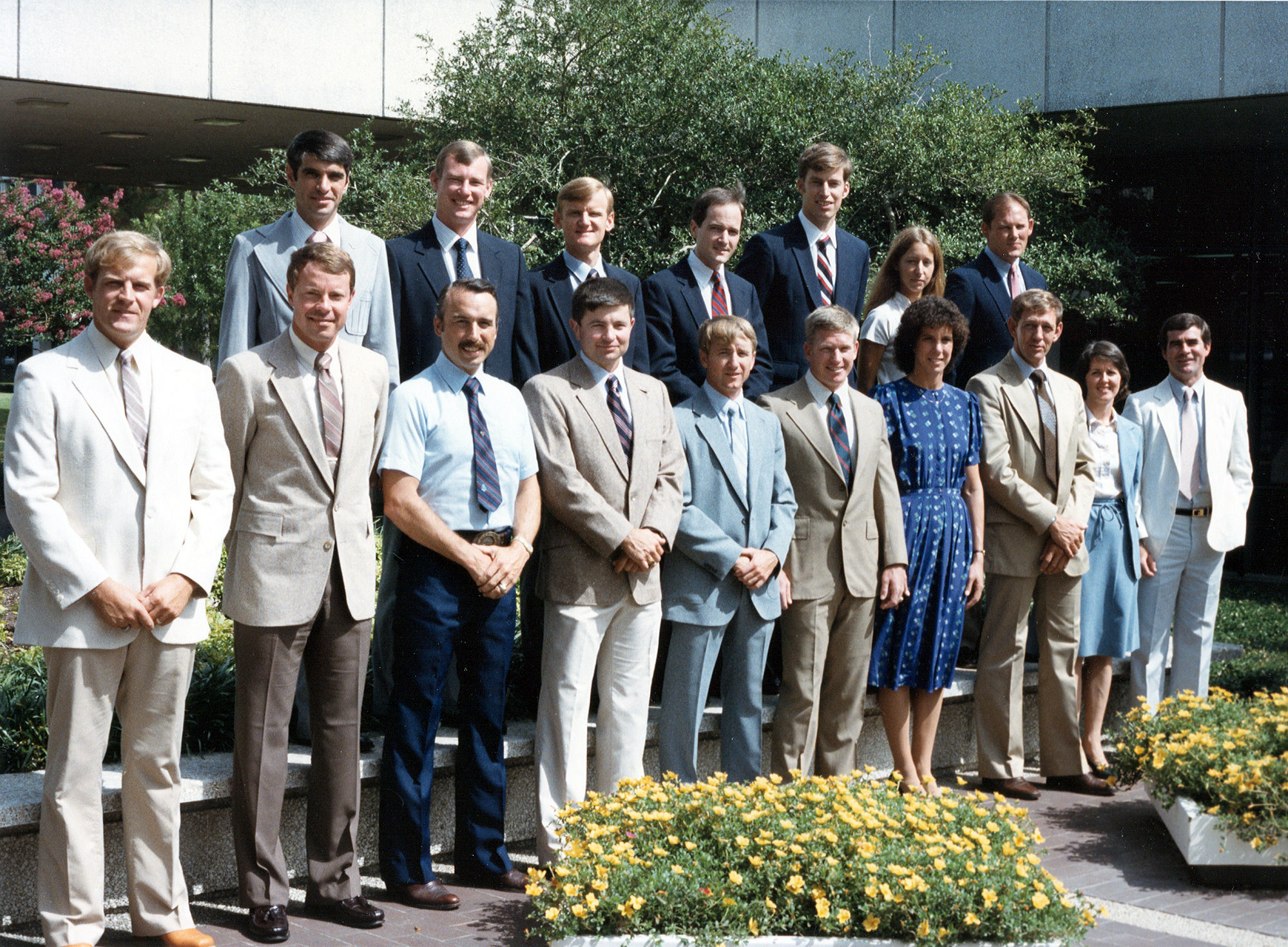
- The Astronauts of Group 10
- Year selected: 1984
- Number selected: 17

NASA Astronaut Group 10 (nicknamed "The Maggots") was a group of 17 astronauts that were announced on May 23, 1984 and consisted of seven pilots and ten mission specialists. Although selected in 1984, no member of the group would fly until 1988 (William Shepherd on STS-27) due to the Challenger disaster and the resulting grounding of the Space Shuttle fleet.

== Achievements ==
Of this group, several spaceflight firsts were achieved:

- First American-born Hispanic astronaut and first Hispanic shuttle pilot and commander: Sidney Gutierrez (June 5, 1991, STS-40)
- First International Space Station commander: William Shepherd (October 31, 2000, Expedition 1)
- First person to command five space missions and tallest person in space: James Wetherbee (November 23, 2002, STS-113)
- First submariner in space: Michael McCulley (October 18, 1989, STS-34)

== Group members ==
=== Pilots ===
- Kenneth D. Cameron (born 1949), U.S. Marine Corps (3 flights)

STS-37 Atlantis — April 1991 — Pilot — Compton Gamma Ray Observatory deployment
STS-56 Discovery — April 1993 — Commander — ATLAS-2, solar observation experiments, first radio contact between the Space Shuttle and Mir
STS-74 Atlantis — November 1995 — Commander — Second Mir docking, fourth Shuttle-Mir mission

- John H. Casper (born 1943), U.S. Air Force (4 flights)

STS-36 Atlantis — February 1990 — Pilot — Classified United States Department of Defense mission, deployed USA-53 (Misty)
STS-54 Endeavour — January 1993 — Commander — TDRS-6 deployment
STS-62 Columbia — March 1994 — Commander — USMP-02 microgravity experiment package and OAST-2 payload
STS-77 Endeavour — May 1996 — Commander — SPACEHAB mission

- Frank L. Culbertson, Jr. (born 1949), U.S. Navy (3 flights)

STS-38 Atlantis — November 1990 — Pilot — Classified United States Department of Defense mission, spy satellite deployment
STS-51 Discovery — September 1993 — Commander — Advanced Communications Technology Satellite deployment
STS-105 Discovery/STS-108 Endeavour ISS Expedition 3 — August–December 2001 — Commander

- Sidney M. Gutierrez (born 1951), U.S. Air Force (2 flights)

STS-40 Columbia — June 1991 — Pilot — Spacelab mission
STS-59 Endeavour — April 1994 — Commander — SRL-1 radar observations

- L. Blaine Hammond, Jr. (born 1952), U.S. Air Force (2 flights)

STS-39 Discovery — April 1991 — Pilot — First unclassified United States Department of Defense mission
STS-64 Discovery — September 1994 — Pilot — Earth and solar observations, first untethered spacewalk since STS-51-A

- Michael J. McCulley (born 1943), U.S. Navy (1 flight)

STS-34 Atlantis — October 1989 — Pilot — Deployment of Galileo orbiter and probe to Jupiter

- James D. "Wxb" Wetherbee (born 1952), U.S. Navy (6 flights)

STS-32 Columbia — January 1990 — Pilot — Long Duration Exposure Facility retrieval, deployment of SYNCOM IV-F5
STS-52 Columbia — October 1992 — Commander — LAGEOS-II deployment, USMP-01 microgravity experiment package
STS-63 Discovery — February 1995 — Commander — First rendezvous of the Space Shuttle and Mir, second Shuttle-Mir mission, first Shuttle mission with female Pilot
STS-86 Atlantis — September 1997 — Commander — Seventh Mir docking
STS-102 Discovery — March 2001 — Commander — International Space Station mission, crew rotation and delivery of MPLM Leonardo
STS-113 Endeavour — November 2002 — Commander — International Space Station mission, crew rotation and installment of P1 truss, last successful Shuttle mission before the Columbia disaster

=== Mission Specialists ===
- James C. Adamson (born 1946), U.S. Army (2 flights)

STS-28 Columbia — August 1989 — Mission Specialist — Classified United States Department of Defense mission, USA-40 and USA-41 deployments
STS-43 Atlantis — August 1991 — Mission Specialist — TDRS-5 deployment

- Ellen S. Baker (born 1953), Physician (3 flights)

STS-34 Atlantis — October 1989 — Mission Specialist — Deployment of Galileo orbiter and probe to Jupiter
STS-50 Columbia — June 1992 — Mission Specialist — USML-1 microgravity laboratory mission, first use of Extended Duration Orbiter package and first landing of Columbia at Kennedy Space Center
STS-71 Atlantis — June 1995 — Mission Specialist — First docking with Mir, third Shuttle-Mir mission, Mir crew rotation

- Mark N. Brown (born 1951), U.S. Air Force (2 flights)

STS-28 Columbia — August 1989 — Mission Specialist — Classified United States Department of Defense mission, USA-40 and USA-41 deployments
STS-48 Discovery — September 1991 — Mission Specialist — Upper Atmosphere Research Satellite deployment

- Manley L. "Sonny" Carter, Jr. (1947–1991), U.S. Navy (1 flight)

STS-33 Discovery — November 1989 — Mission Specialist — Classified United States Department of Defense mission, USA-48 deployment, first night launch since Challenger disaster

- Marsha S. Ivins (born 1951), Engineer (5 flights)

STS-32 Columbia — January 1990 — Mission Specialist — Long Duration Exposure Facility retrieval, deployment of SYNCOM IV-F5
STS-46 Atlantis — July 1992 — Mission Specialist — European Retrievable Carrier deployment, tethered satellite experiments
STS-62 Columbia — March 1994 — Mission Specialist — USMP-02 microgravity experiment package and OAST-2 payload
STS-81 Atlantis — January 1997 — Mission Specialist — Third Mir docking, fifth Shuttle-Mir mission, Mir crew rotation
STS-98 Atlantis — February 2001 — Mission Specialist — International Space Station mission, installment of Destiny Laboratory Module

- Mark C. Lee (born 1952), U.S. Air Force (4 flights)

STS-30 Atlantis — May 1989 — Mission Specialist — Deployment of Magellan probe to Venus
STS-47 Endeavour — September 1992 — Payload Commander — Spacelab mission, first Japanese astronaut to fly on the Shuttle, first African-American woman in space, first married couple in space
STS-64 Discovery — September 1994 — Mission Specialist — Earth and solar observations, first untethered spacewalk since STS-51-A
STS-82 Discovery — February 1997 — Mission Specialist — Second Hubble Space Telescope servicing mission

- G. David Low (1956–2008), Engineer (3 flights)

STS-32 Columbia — January 1990 — Mission Specialist — Long Duration Exposure Facility retrieval, deployment of SYNCOM IV-F5
STS-43 Atlantis — August 1991 — Mission Specialist — TDRS-5 deployment
STS-57 Endeavour — June 1993 — Mission Specialist — European Retrievable Carrier retrieval, SPACEHAB mission

- William M. Shepherd (born 1949), U.S. Navy (4 flights)

STS-27 Atlantis — December 1988 — Mission Specialist — Classified United States Department of Defense mission, USA-34 (Lacrosse-1) deployment
STS-41 Discovery — October 1990 — Mission Specialist — Deployment of Ulysses probe into polar orbit of the Sun
STS-52 Columbia — October 1992 — Mission Specialist — LAGEOS-II deployment, USMP-01 microgravity experiment package
Soyuz TM-31 October 2000/STS-102 Discovery March 2001 - ISS Expedition 1 Commander — First long-duration International Space Station crew

- Kathryn C. Thornton (born 1952), Physicist (4 flights)

STS-33 Discovery — November 1989 — Mission Specialist — Classified United States Department of Defense mission, USA-48 deployment, first night launch since Challenger disaster
STS-49 Endeavour — May 1992 — Mission Specialist — Maiden flight of Endeavour, Intelsat 603 retrieval and relaunch
STS-61 Endeavour — December 1993 — Mission Specialist — First Hubble Space Telescope servicing mission
STS-73 Columbia — October 1995 — Mission Specialist — USML-2 microgravity laboratory mission

- Charles Veach (1944–1995), U.S. Air Force (2 flights)

STS-39 Discovery — April 1991 — Mission Specialist — First unclassified United States Department of Defense mission
STS-52 Columbia — October 1992 — Mission Specialist — LAGEOS-II deployment, USMP-01 microgravity experiment package

== See also ==
- List of astronauts by year of selection
