= G. David Low =

American astronaut (1956–2008)

David Low
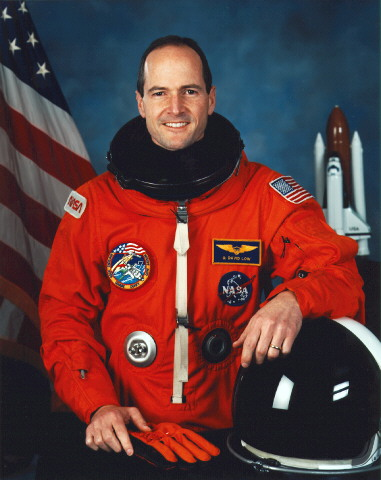
- Born: George David Low; February 19, 1956; Cleveland, Ohio, U.S.
- Died: March 15, 2008 (aged 52); Reston, Virginia, U.S.
- Education: Washington and Lee University (BS); Cornell University (BS); Stanford University (MS)
- Space career

NASA astronaut
- Time in space: 29d 18h 5m
- Selection: NASA Group 10 (1984)
- Total EVAs: 1
- Total EVA time: 5h, 50m
- Missions: STS-32; STS-43; STS-57
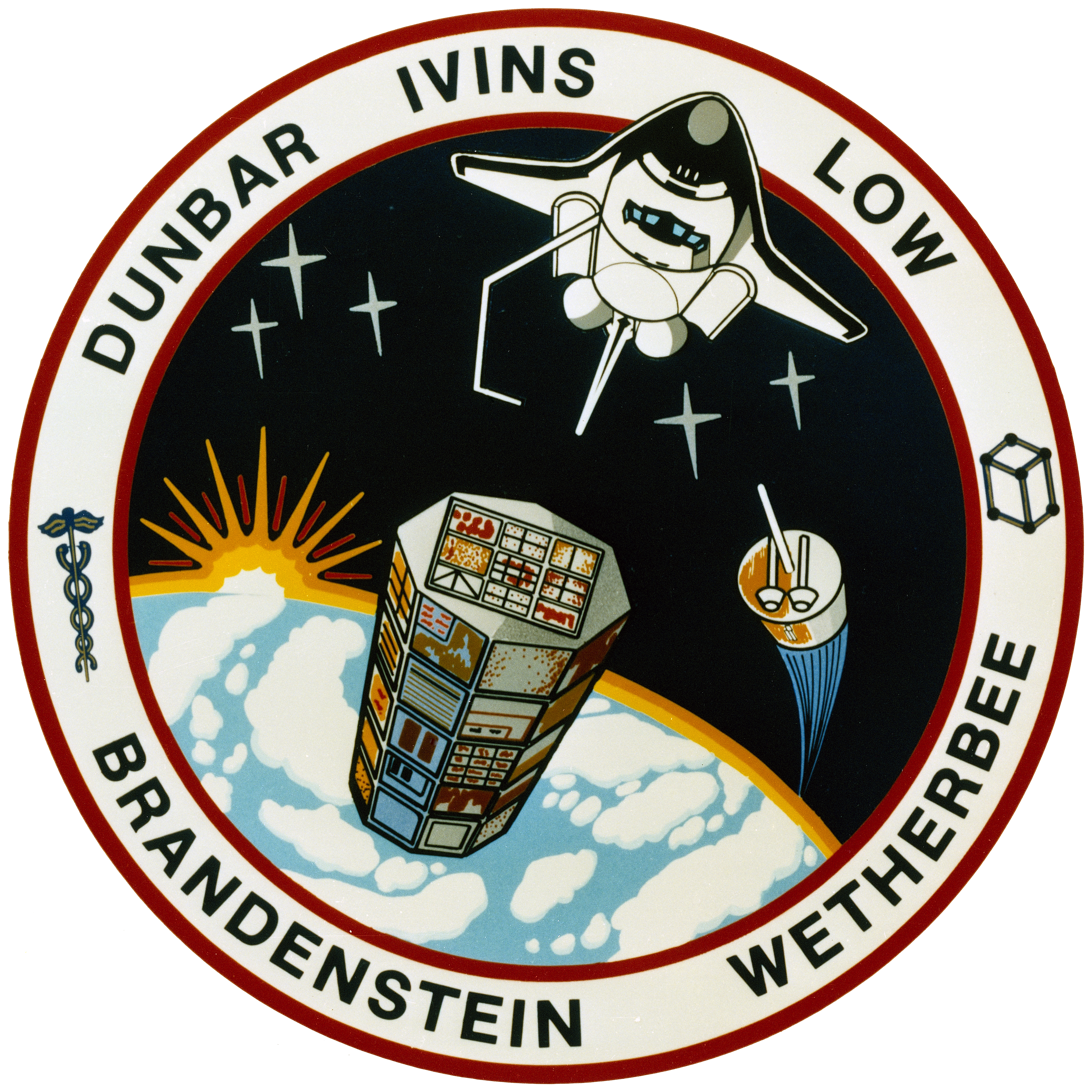
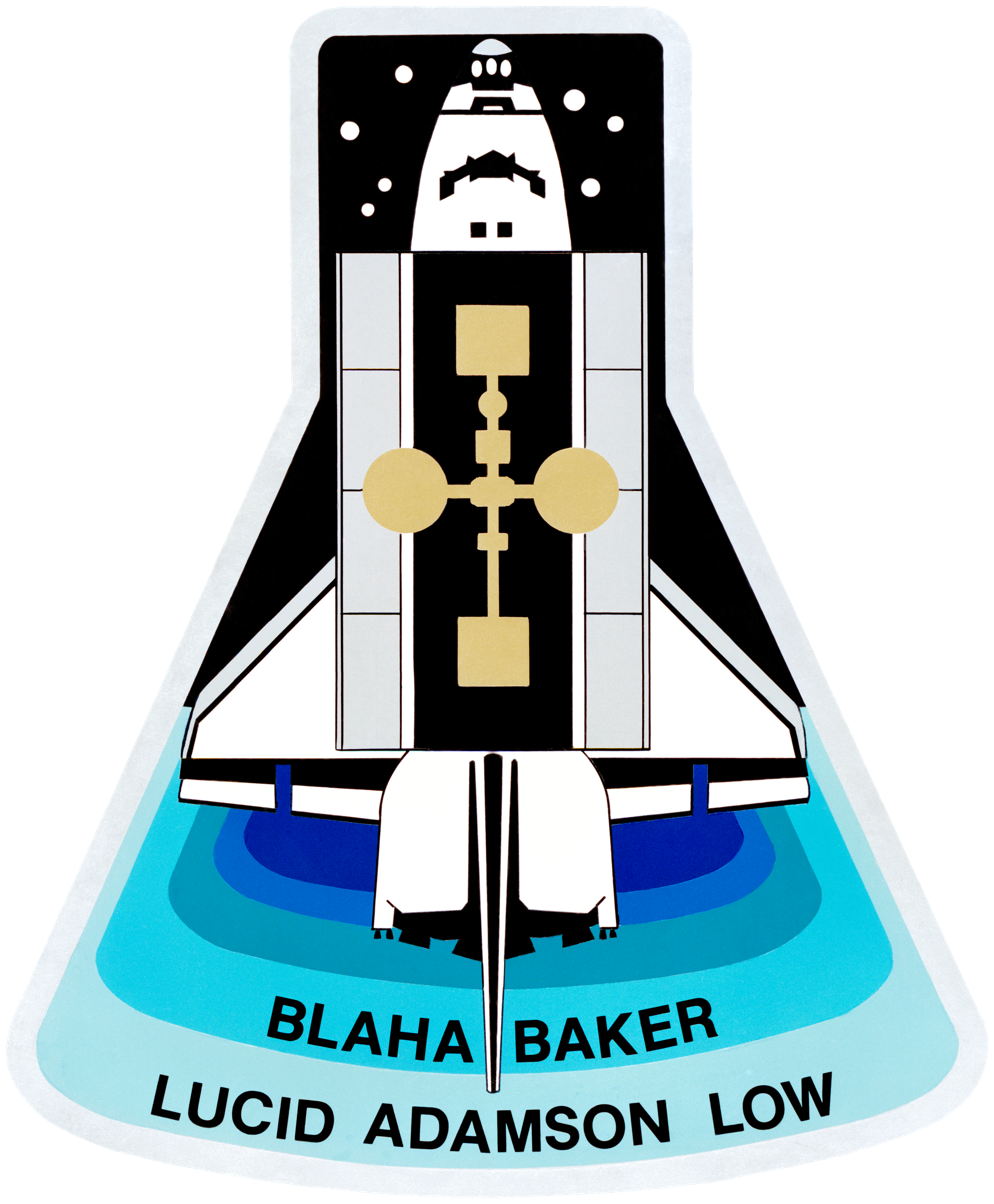
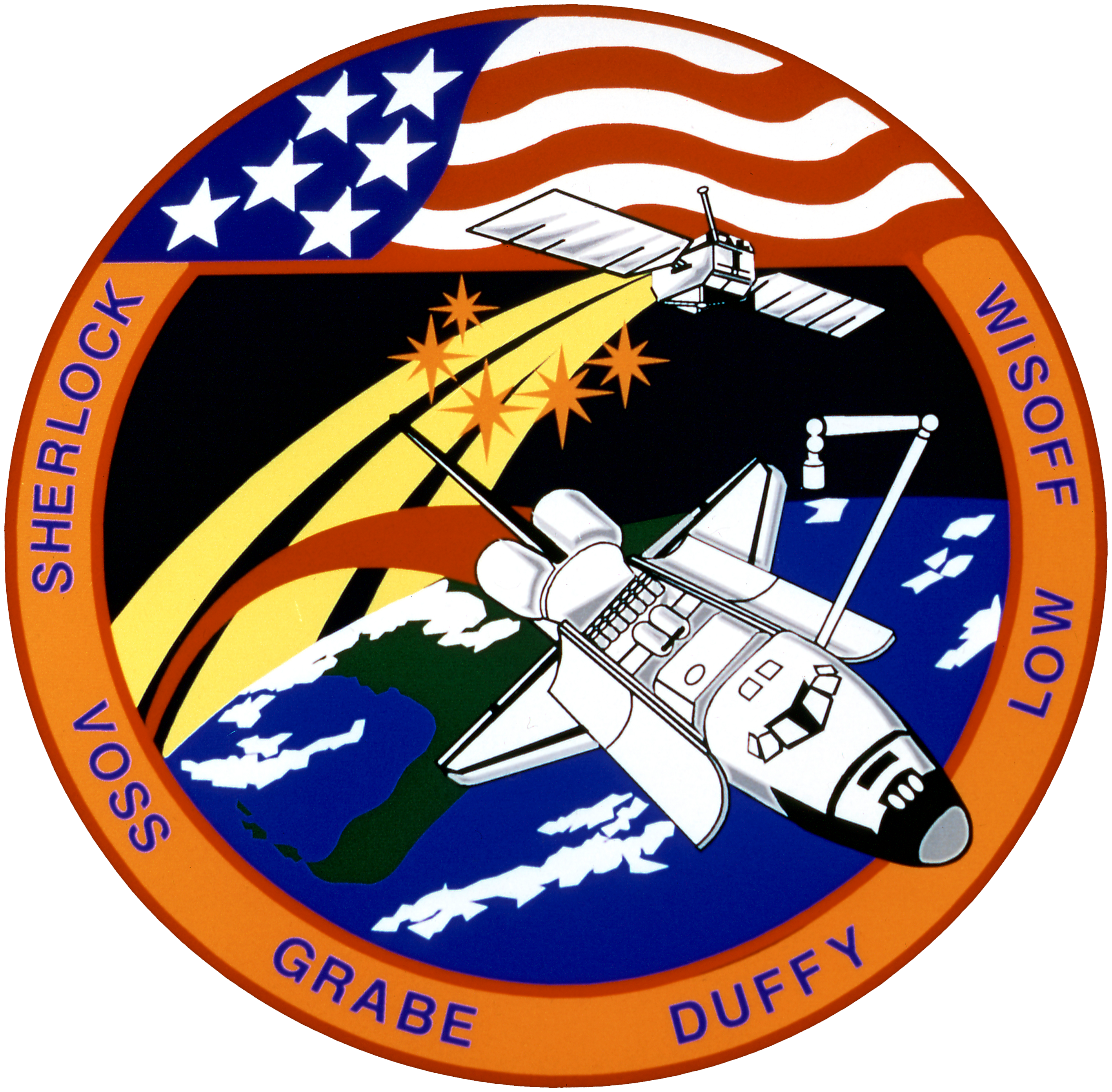
- Mission insignia
- Retired: 1996

George David Low (February 19, 1956 – March 15, 2008) was an American aerospace executive and a NASA astronaut. With undergraduate degrees in physics and mechanical engineering and a master's degree in aeronautics and astronautics, he worked in the Jet Propulsion Laboratory (JPL) at the California Institute of Technology in the early 80's, before being picked as an astronaut candidate by NASA in 1984. In addition to holding some technical assignments, he logged more than 700 hours in space (including stints on the Columbia, the Atlantis, and the Endeavour Space Shuttles), before he left NASA in 1996 to pursue a career in the private sector. He was the son of George M. Low, the manager of the Apollo Spacecraft Program Office, and later, the 14th president of Rensselaer Polytechnic Institute.

== Personal life ==
Low was born February 19, 1956, in Cleveland, Ohio, to former NASA Administrator George Low and Mary Ruth Low (nee McNamera), and was active in the Boy Scouts of America where he achieved its second highest rank, Life Scout. He was married to the former JoAnn Andochick of Weirton, West Virginia. They had three children. He enjoyed tennis, lacrosse, scuba diving, running, and spending time with his family. In 1968 it was his father who proposed that Apollo 8 fly to the Moon. Low died of colon cancer on March 15, 2008, at Reston Hospital Center in Virginia.

== Education ==
Low graduated from Langley High School, McLean, Virginia, in 1974; received a Bachelor of Science degree in physics and engineering from Washington & Lee University in 1978, a Bachelor of Science degree in mechanical engineering from Cornell University in 1980, and a Master of Science degree in aeronautics and astronautics from Stanford University in 1983. He also went to Harvard University and Johns Hopkins University.

== Organizations ==
- Associate Fellow of the American Institute of Aeronautics and Astronautics
- Member of Omicron Delta Kappa
- Member of Phi Kappa Sigma

== Awards and honors ==
- NASA Space Flight Medals (3)
- NASA Exceptional Service Medal
- NASA Outstanding Leadership Medal
- honorary doctorate of engineering degree from Rensselaer Polytechnic Institute
- Cygnus Orb-D1 spacecraft, the first Cygnus to travel, was named the S.S. G. David Low in his memory. All subsequent Cygnus spacecraft are named for personnel involved in space.

== Aerospace career ==
Low worked in the Spacecraft Systems Engineering Section of the Jet Propulsion Laboratory, California Institute of Technology, from March 1980 until June 1984. During that time he was involved in the preliminary planning of several planetary missions, an Autonomous Spacecraft Maintenance study, and the systems engineering design of the Galileo spacecraft. Following a one-year leave to pursue graduate studies, Low returned to JPL where he was the principal spacecraft systems engineer for the Mars Geoscience/Climatology Orbiter (Mars Observer) mission.

== NASA career ==
Selected by NASA in May 1984 as an astronaut candidate, Low became an astronaut in June 1985. He held a variety of technical assignments including work on the Canadarm (RMS), on Extra-vehicular activity (EVA), and Orbiter test and checkout tasks at the Kennedy Space Center. Low served as a spacecraft communicator (CAPCOM) in the Mission Control Center during STS Missions 26, 27, 29 and 30. He also served as the lead astronaut in the Man-Systems Group and Station Operations Group of the Space Station Support Office. In 1993, Low was a member of the Russian Integration Team which worked for several months in Crystal City, Virginia to define the changes from the old Space Station Freedom to the new International Space Station. In 1994, he served as the Manager of the EVA Integration and Operations Office, and in 1995 he served as an assistant in the NASA Legislative Affairs Office where he worked with Members of the United States Congress and their staffs to keep them informed about NASA's aeronautics and space programs. A veteran of three space flights, Low logged over 714 hours in space, including nearly six hours on a spacewalk. He was a mission specialist on STS-32 (January 9-20, 1990) and STS-43 (August 2-11, 1991), and was the payload commander on STS-57 (June 21 to July 1, 1993).

Low left NASA in February 1996 to pursue an aerospace career with Orbital Sciences Corporation's Launch Systems Group in Dulles, Virginia.

== Spaceflight experience ==
On his first mission, Low was a crew member on STS-32 which launched from the Kennedy Space Center, Florida, on January 9, 1990. On board the Space Shuttle Columbia the crew successfully deployed the Syncom IV-F5 communications satellite, and retrieved the 21,400-pound Long Duration Exposure Facility (LDEF) using the Canadarm or SRMS. They also operated a variety of middeck materials and life sciences experiments, as well as the IMAX camera. Following 173 orbits of the Earth in 261 hours, Columbia returned to a night landing at Edwards Air Force Base, California, on January 20, 1990.

Low next served as the flight engineer aboard the Space Shuttle Atlantis on STS-43. The nine-day mission launched from the Kennedy Space Center, Florida, on August 2, 1991. During the flight, crew members deployed the fifth Tracking and Data Relay Satellite (TDRS-E), in addition to conducting 32 physical, material, and life science experiments, mostly relating to the Extended Duration Orbiter (EDO) and Space Station Freedom. After 142 orbits of the Earth in 213 hours, the mission concluded with a landing on Runway 15 at the Kennedy Space Center on August 11, 1991.

On STS-57, Low served as payload commander aboard the Space Shuttle Endeavour, which launched from the Kennedy Space Center, Florida, on June 21, 1993. The primary objective of this flight was the retrieval of the European Retrievable Carrier satellite (EURECA) using the Canadarm. Additionally, this mission featured the first flight of Spacehab, a commercially provided middeck augmentation module for the conduct of microgravity experiments. Spacehab carried 22 individual flight experiments in materials and life sciences research. During the mission Low, along with crew mate Peter J. K. Wisoff, conducted a 5-hour, 50-minute spacewalk during which the EURECA communications antennas were manually positioned for latching, and various extravehicular activity (EVA) tools and techniques were evaluated for use on future missions. Endeavour landed at the Kennedy Space Center on July 1, 1993, after 155 orbits of the Earth in 239 hours.
