= Mark N. Brown =

American astronaut and engineer (born 1951)

Mark Brown
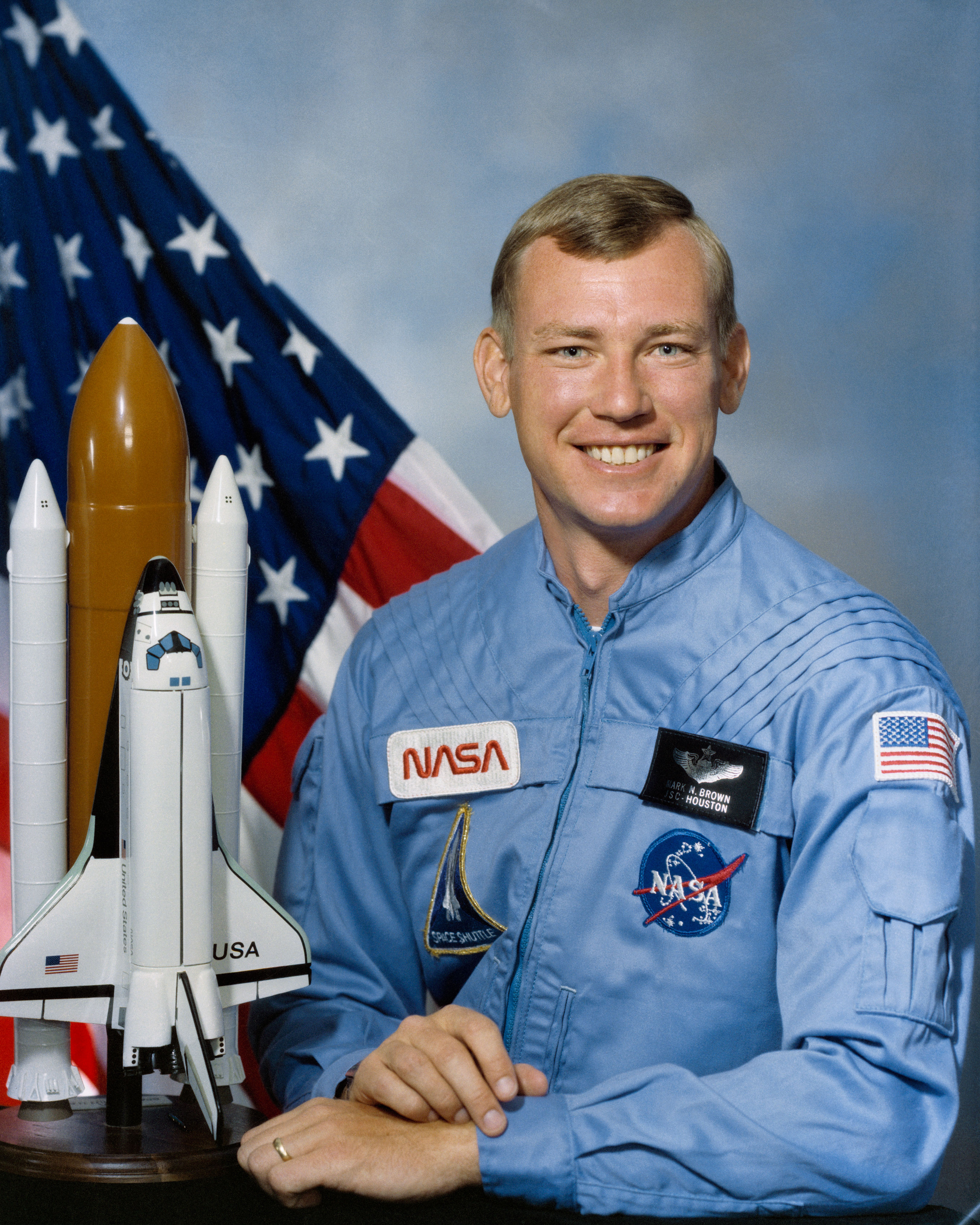
- Born: Mark Neil Brown; November 18, 1951 (age 74); Valparaiso, Indiana, U.S.
- Education: Purdue University (BS); Air University (MS)
- Space career

NASA astronaut
- Rank: Colonel, USAF
- Time in space: 10d 9h 27m
- Selection: NASA Group 10 (1984)
- Missions: STS-28; STS-48
- Retired: July 1993

Mark Neil Brown (born November 18, 1951) is an American engineer, retired colonel in the United States Air Force and former NASA astronaut. Brown spent a total of ten days in space, over two Space Shuttle missions.

== Personal life ==
Brown was born November 18, 1951, in Valparaiso, Indiana, to Mr. and Mrs. Richard S. Brown. His recreational interests include fishing, hiking, jogging, all sports and chess. He married the former Lynne A. Anderson of River Grove, Illinois; they have two daughters.

== Education ==
- 1969: Graduated from Valparaiso High School, Valparaiso, Indiana
- 1973: Received a Bachelor of Science degree in aeronautical and astronautical engineering from Purdue University, West Lafayette, Indiana
- 1980: Received a Master of Science degree in astronautical engineering from the U.S. Air Force Institute of Technology of Air University, Dayton, Ohio

== Air Force experience ==
Following graduation from Purdue in 1973, Brown was commissioned in the U.S. Air Force and received his pilot wings at Laughlin Air Force Base, Texas, in 1974. He was then assigned to the 87th Fighter Interceptor Squadron at K.I. Sawyer Air Force Base, Michigan, where he flew both T-33 and F-106 aircraft. Brown graduated from the Squadron Officer School at Maxwell Air Force Base, Alabama, in 1975. He was transferred to the U.S. Air Force Institute of Technology at Wright-Patterson Air Force Base, Ohio, and earned his master's degree in astronautical engineering in 1980. Two years later, he graduated from the Air Command and Staff College at Maxwell Air Force Base, Alabama.

== NASA career ==
Brown was assigned to the Lyndon B. Johnson Space Center in 1980. Assigned as an engineer in the Flight Activities Section, he participated in the development of contingency procedures for use aboard the Space Shuttle and served as an attitude and pointing officer. Brown supported STS-2, STS-3, STS-4, STS-6, STS-8 and STS-41-C in the Flight Activity Officer/Staff Support Room of the Mission Control Center.

Brown became an astronaut in June 1985 after being selected in May 1984, and qualified for assignment as a mission specialist on future Space Shuttle flight crews. In December 1985, he was assigned to the crew of STS-61-N, a Department of Defense mission which was canceled due to the Challenger disaster. During 1986 and 1987, he was an astronaut member of the solid rocket booster redesign team. In February 1988, Brown was assigned to STS-28, flying on 8 August 1989, after which he served as astronaut member on the Space Station Freedom program, which was later canceled. He next flew on STS-48 on 12 September 1991. Brown had logged over 249 hours in space after flying two missions.

On his first space flight, Brown was a mission specialist on the crew of STS-28. The orbiter Columbia was launched from Kennedy Space Center on August 8, 1989. The mission carried Department of Defense payloads and a number of secondary payloads. After 80 orbits of the Earth, this five-day mission concluded with a dry lakebed landing on Runway 17 at Edwards Air Force Base, California, on 13 August 1989.

Brown also flew on STS-48 aboard Discovery on 12 September 1991. This was a five-day mission during which the crew deployed the Upper Atmosphere Research Satellite (UARS) which is designed to provide scientists with their first complete data set on the upper atmosphere's chemistry, winds and energy inputs. The crew also conducted numerous secondary experiments ranging from growing protein crystals to studying how fluids and structures react in weightlessness. The mission was accomplished in 81 orbits of the Earth and concluded with a landing at Edwards Air Force Base on September 18, 1991.

Brown left NASA in July 1993 and retired from the U.S. Air Force to head the Space Division office of General Research Corporation in Dayton, Ohio.

== Special honors ==
- Air Force Command Pilot
- Senior Space Badge
- Defense Superior Service Medal
- Air Force Commendation Medals (2)
- Air Force Outstanding Unit Award
- Combat Readiness Medal
- National Defense Service Medal
- Small Arms Expert Marksmanship Ribbon
- NASA Space Flight Medal
- Distinguished Graduate from Air Force ROTC
- Aerospace Defense Command "We Point With Pride" Award
