= James C. Adamson =

American astronaut (born 1946)

James Adamson
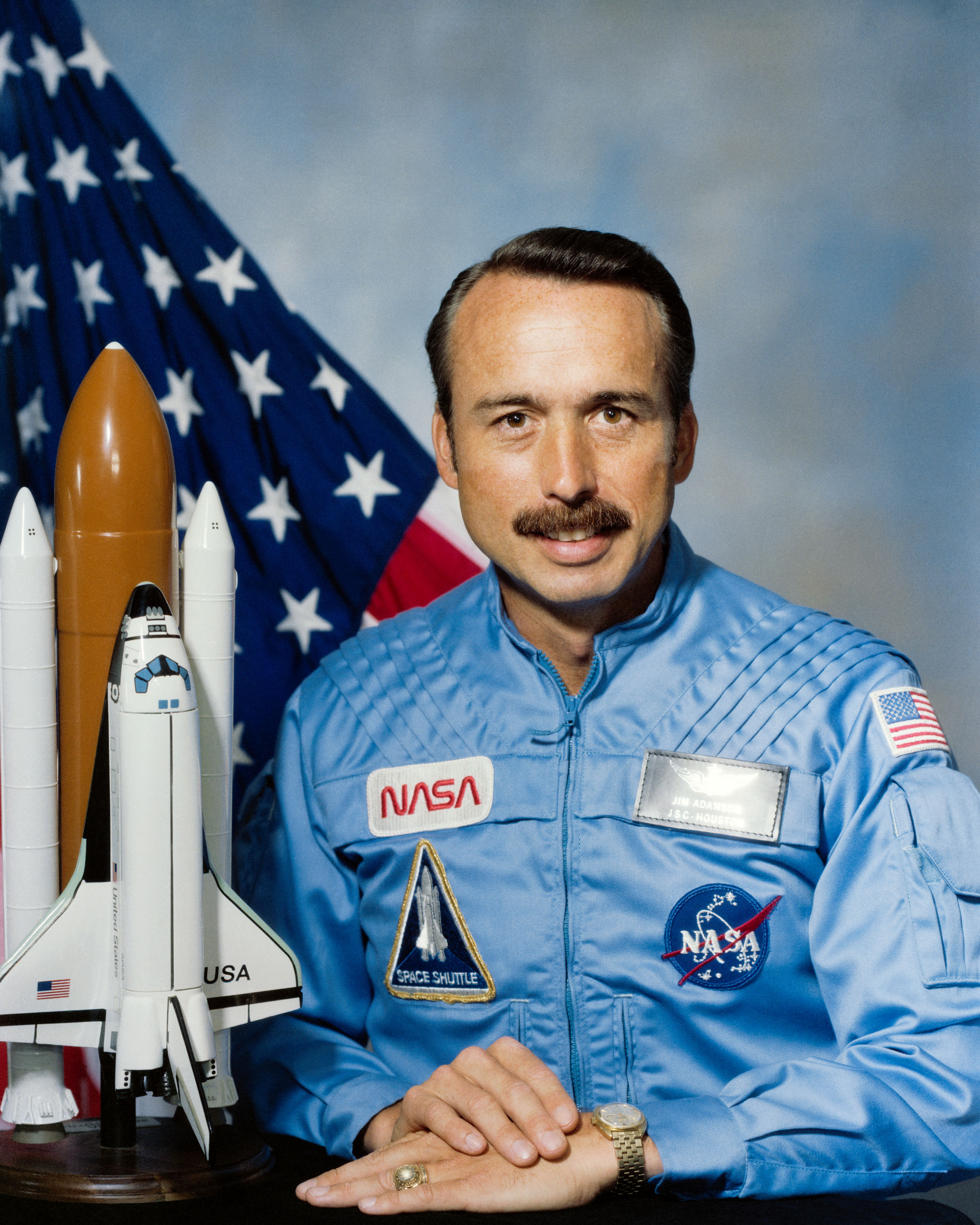
- Born: James Craig Adamson; March 3, 1946 (age 80); Warsaw, New York, U.S.
- Education: United States Military Academy (BS); Princeton University (MS)
- Space career

NASA astronaut
- Rank: Colonel, USA
- Time in space: 13d 22h 21m
- Selection: NASA Group 10 (1984)
- Missions: STS-28; STS-43
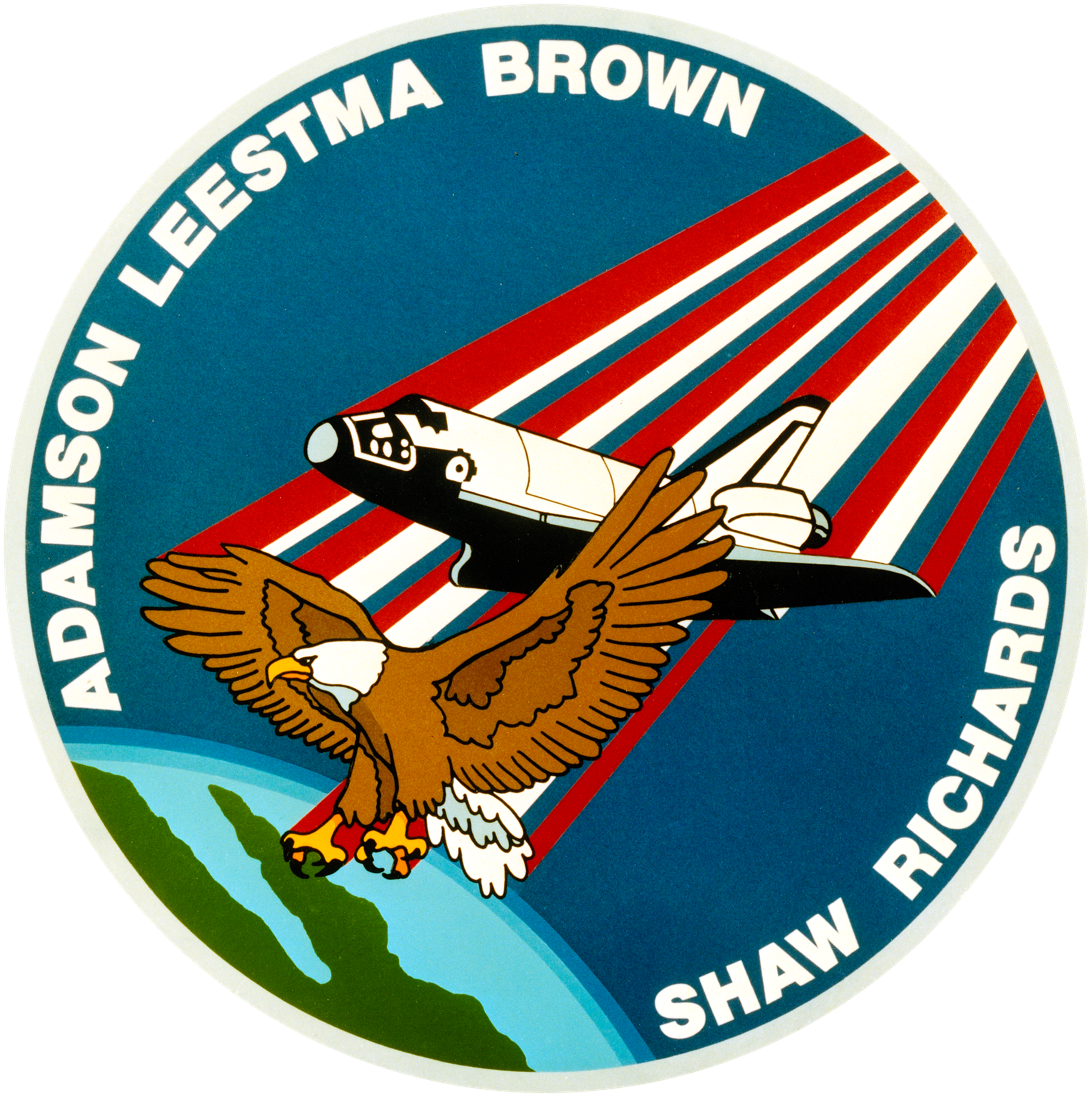
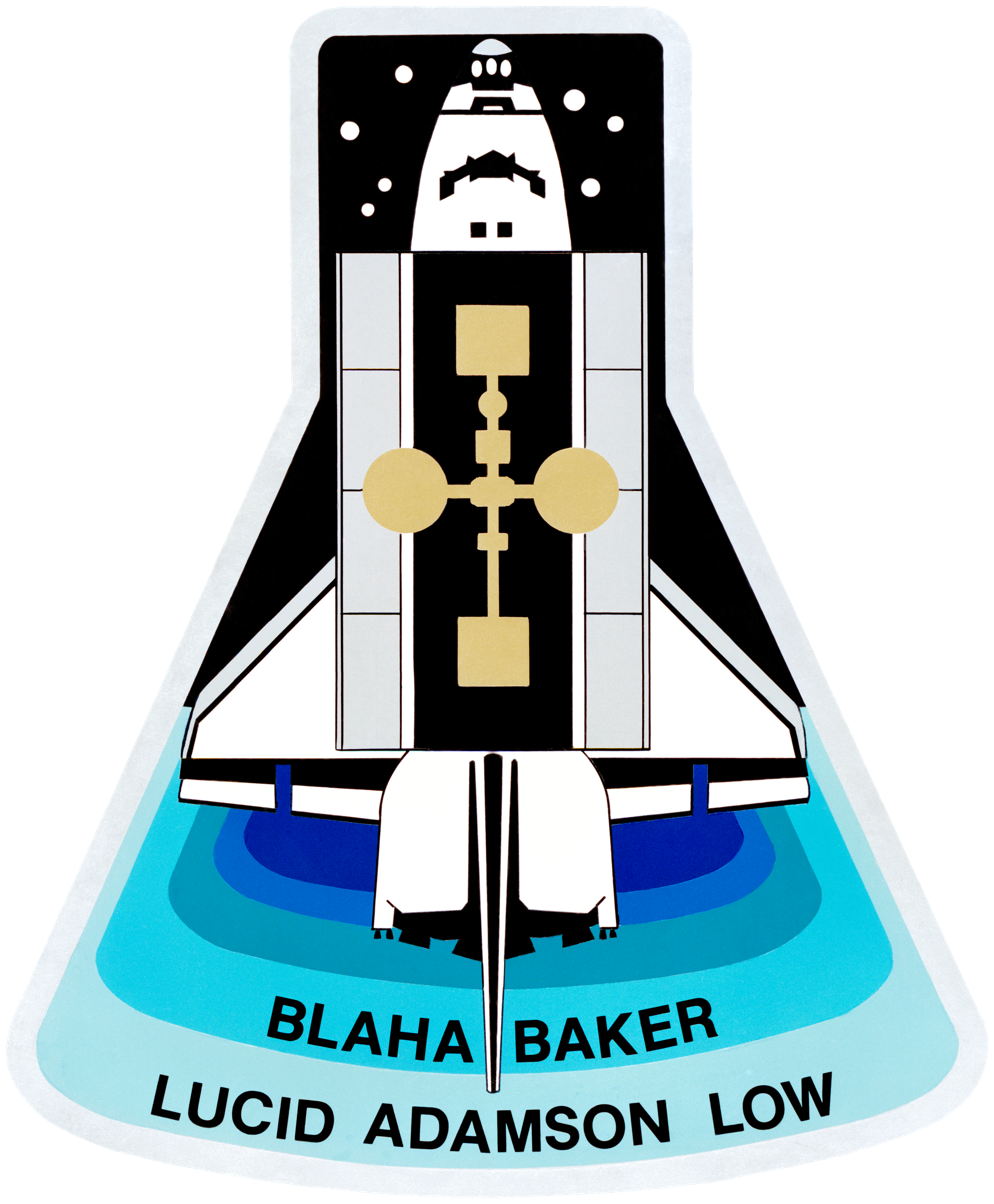
- Mission insignia

James Craig Adamson (born March 3, 1946) is a former NASA astronaut and retired Colonel of the United States Army. He is married with 3 children. James Adamson flew on two missions, STS-28 and STS-43, and completed 263 orbits and 334 hours in space. After retiring from NASA, he was recruited by Allied Signal (later merged with Honeywell) where he retired in 2001. Adamson has logged over 3,000 hours in over 30 different types of helicopters and airplanes.

== Personal data ==
Adamson was born March 3, 1946, in Warsaw, New York. He currently resides in Fishersville, Virginia with his wife Ellen and two of his three children.

== Education ==
Adamson completed his Bachelor of Science degree in Engineering and was commissioned a second lieutenant in the U.S. Army at United States Military Academy at West Point, New York in 1969. In 1977, he completed a Master of Science degree in Aerospace Engineering at Princeton University. In 2010, he completed his Chartered Director certification, graduating from The Directors College (a joint venture between McMaster University and the Conference Board of Canada). Additionally, he has completed undergraduate and graduate pilot training, paratrooper training, Arctic water and mountain survival training, nuclear weapons training, basic and advanced officer training, U.S. Army Command and General Staff College, and the U.S. Naval Test Pilot School.

== Military experience ==
As a military test pilot, Adamson has flown research aircraft at Edwards Air Force Base, Princeton University, West Point, Naval Air Station Patuxent River, and NASA Houston. During the Vietnam War, he flew in the IV Corps area and in Cambodia with the Air Cavalry as scout pilot, team lead, and air mission commander. He has also flown with several peacetime flight units at Fort Bliss, Texas, West Point and Houston, Texas. Following completion of his master's in aerospace engineering at Princeton University, he became assistant professor of aerodynamics at the U.S. Military Academy at West Point. While at West Point, he developed and taught courses in fluid mechanics, aerodynamics, aircraft performance, and stability and control. He also developed flight laboratories in aircraft flight testing and completed a text on aircraft performance. In addition to being an experimental test pilot and Master Army Aviator, Adamson is also a certified professional engineer and licensed commercial pilot. In ground assignments with the Army, Adamson has commanded nuclear-capable missile units in Europe and in the United States.

== NASA experience ==
Adamson was employed at the Lyndon B. Johnson Space Center from 1981 to 1992. During the Operational Flight Test phase of the Shuttle Program, he served as a research test pilot and aerodynamics officer in Mission Control. Following completion of the operational test flights he became guidance navigation and control officer for Shuttle Missions 5 through 11. As research test pilot he also conducted airborne remote sensing studies in biospheric research.

Selected by NASA as an astronaut in 1984, Adamson became qualified for mission assignment on Space Shuttle flights. In November 1985, he was selected to the crew of a Department of Defense mission, which was subsequently delayed due to the Challenger accident. During the Shuttle Program reconstruction period, Adamson was one of eleven astronauts selected to hold management positions within NASA. He served as Shuttle Program Office Assistant Manager for Engineering Integration. In this position he was responsible for the initial development of a reliability based maintenance program for the Space Shuttle program. He also initiated an enhancements program for Shuttle ground processing.

In February 1988 Adamson was assigned to the flight crew of STS-28, the first flight of Space Shuttle Columbia following the reconstruction period. Columbia launched from the Kennedy Space Center, Florida, on August 8, 1989. The mission carried a classified Department of Defense payload and a number of secondary payloads. After 80 earth orbits in 121 hours, this five-day mission concluded with a dry lakebed landing on Runway 17 at Edwards Air Force Base, California, on August 13, 1989.

Following STS-28 Adamson once again returned to management. This time he was assigned to the Kennedy Space Center as Director of Shuttle Processing Analysis. He served in this post from September 1989 until October 1990 when he was assigned to the flight crew of STS-43. During this period Adamson developed risk based processing and scheduling programs which resulted in reduction of processing times from 80 days to 50 days.

The nine-day STS-43 mission aboard Space Shuttle Atlantis launched from the Kennedy Space Center on August 2, 1991, setting a new world record for payload weight lifted to orbit. The five member crew deployed a Tracking and Data Relay Satellite (TDRS-E) and conducted 32 physical and life sciences experiments. During this flight, Adamson performed the first flight test of the Orbital Digital Autopilot following Shuttle retrofit with new General Purpose Computers and new software. After 142 earth orbits in 213 hours, the STS-43 mission concluded with a landing on Runway 15 at the Kennedy Space Center on August 11, 1991.

Following Adamson's retirement from government service in June 1992, he continued as a management consultant to NASA and the aerospace industry. Until September 1994 he served as management consultant and strategic planner for Lockheed Corporation in the area of Human Space Flight Operations. He was also selected by the NASA Administrator to serve on the NASA Advisory Council.

In September 1994, Adamson joined Lockheed Corporation as Executive Vice President of Lockheed Engineering and Science Company (LESC) where he was shortly promoted to president and CEO. In late 1995 he was selected by Lockheed Martin to start up and become the first COO of the United Space Alliance (USA), a joint venture with Rockwell International. USA subsequently won the Space Flight Operations Contract with NASA to operate the Space Shuttle Program and grew to $1.5 billion annual revenue in the first year.

In 1999, Adamson was recruited by AlliedSignal Corporation to be the President of Allied Signal Technical Services Corporation. He remained in that post through Allied Signal's merger with Honeywell until his retirement in March 2001.

Adamson is still active as a consultant and board member for the aerospace industry and still serves on the NASA Advisory Council for the NASA Administrator.

== Honors and awards ==
Adamson was recently awarded the "Gil Bennett Gold Standard Award" for corporate governance. In 2007 he was inducted into the Army Aviation Hall of Fame. Adamson was a two time All-American in pistol competition. He was also a winner of the Army's Excellency In Competition Award, and a recipient of the George S. Patton Award. Named an Outstanding College Athlete of America, Adamson captained West Point's pistol team to the national championship in 1969. He was a distinguished graduate of his pilot training class, as well as his graduate fixed-wing and multi-engine pilot training classes. During aerial combat in Southeast Asia, he earned two Distinguished Flying Crosses, 18 Air Medals, and three Vietnam Crosses of Gallantry for valor. He has also earned the Defense Superior Service Medal, Defense Meritorious Service Medal, the Meritorious Service Medal, two Army Commendation Medals, the Bronze Star, NASA Exceptional Service Medal, two NASA Space Flight Medals, and is a world record holder for space flight lifting the most weight to orbit. He is a Charter Honoree of the Geneseo Central School Alumni Hall of Fame, Class of 1964. Adamson is an Eagle Scout.

== Publications ==
1. "Synthesis of BIS-2-(1,3-Diphenylimidazolidinylidene)", West Point, 1969
2. "A Helicopter Simulator Study of Control Display Tradeoffs in a Deceleration Approach", Article to the American Helicopter Society Journal, 1976.
3. Fundamentals of Applied Aerodynamics, Text rewrite, West Point, 1978.
4. Principles of Aircraft Performance, Text for USMA Dept. of Mechanics, 1979.
5. T41-B Aircrew Training Manual, West Point, 1979.
6. "The USMA Flight Laboratory Program", Paper to ASEE, 1980.
7. "A Simulator Study of Control and Display Tradeoffs in a Decelerating Approach", Adamson, Born, Dukes, MAE Tech. Rpt. No. 1428, Princeton NJ, 1976.
8. "A Helicopter Simulator Study of Control Display Tradeoffs in a Decelerating Approach", Masters Thesis, Princeton NJ, 1976.
9. "Dynamic Methods for Performance Flight Testing", Paper to the United States Navy Test Pilot School, Patuxent River MD, 1981.
10. "An Analysis of The Projected Manpower Requirements for the Shuttle Processing Contract", NASA Report JSC-22662, 1988.
11. NASA Response to the Presidential Commission on the Challenger Accident, contributing author, Houston, 1986.
