= David Leestma =

American astronaut (born 1949)

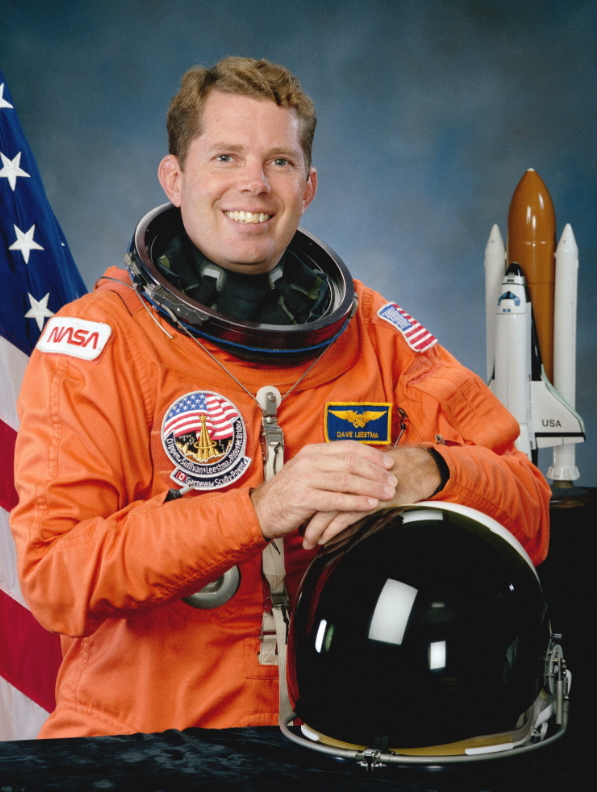
- Born: David Cornell Leestma; May 6, 1949 (age 77); Muskegon, Michigan, U.S.
- Education: United States Naval Academy (BS); Naval Postgraduate School (MS)
- Space career

NASA astronaut
- Rank: Captain, USN
- Time in space: 22d 4h 32m
- Selection: NASA Group 9 (1980)
- Total EVAs: 1
- Total EVA time: 3h 29m
- Mission: STS-41-G; STS-28; STS-45

David Cornell Leestma (born May 6, 1949) is a former American astronaut and retired Captain in the United States Navy.

== Personal life ==
He was born on May 6, 1949, in Muskegon, Michigan. He and his wife have six children. He enjoys golfing, tennis, aviation, and fishing.

== Education ==
He graduated from Tustin High School in Tustin, California, in 1967, received a Bachelor of Science degree in Aeronautical Engineering from the United States Naval Academy in 1971, and a Master of Science degree in Aeronautical Engineering from the U.S. Naval Postgraduate School in 1972.

== Organizations ==
He is an Associate Fellow of the American Institute of Aeronautics and Astronautics (AIAA) and a Life Member of the Association of Naval Aviation.

== Honors ==
He has received the Distinguished Flying Cross, Legion of Merit, Defense Superior Service Medal, Defense Meritorious Service Medal, Navy Commendation Medal, Navy Achievement Medal, Meritorious Unit Commendation (VX-4), National Defense Service Medal, Battle "E" Award (VF-32), the Rear Admiral Thurston James Award (1973), the NASA Space Flight Medal (1984, 1989, 1992), the NASA Exceptional Service Medal (1985, 1988, 1991, 1992), and the NASA Outstanding Leadership Medal (1993, 1994). He was awarded the Presidential Rank of Meritorious Executive Award in 1998 and again in 2004.

== Experience ==
Leestma joined the U.S Naval Sea Cadet Corps in 8th grade. Leestma said that "[Sea Cadets] was my first experience with the military service and it appealed to me... [Sea Cadets] was the beginning of this journey with the Navy that has been a lifetime experience." Leestma graduated first in his class from the U.S. Naval Academy in 1971. As a first lieutenant afloat, he was assigned to USS Hepburn in Long Beach, California, before reporting in January 1972 to the U.S. Naval Postgraduate School. He completed United States Naval Flight Officer training and received his NFO wings in October 1973. He was assigned to VF-124 in San Diego, California, for initial flight training in the F-14A Tomcat and then transferred to VF-32 in June 1974 and was stationed at Virginia Beach, Virginia. Leestma made three overseas deployments to the Mediterranean/North Atlantic areas while flying aboard the aircraft carrier USS John F. Kennedy. In 1977, he was reassigned to Air Test and Evaluation Squadron Four (VX-4) at Naval Air Station Point Mugu, California. As an operational test director with the F-14A, he conducted the first operational testing of new tactical software for the F-14 and completed the follow-on test and evaluation of new F-14A avionics, including the programmable signal processor. He also served as fleet model manager for the F-14A tactical manual.

He has logged over 3,500 hours of flight time, including nearly 1,500 hours in the F-14A. Leestma retired from the Navy as a captain.

=== NASA experience ===
He was selected by NASA to become an astronaut in 1980 and was the first member of NASA Astronaut Group 9 to go into space. Following his first flight, Leestma served as a capsule communicator (CAPCOM) for STS-51-C through STS-61-A. He was then assigned as the Chief, Mission Development Branch, responsible for assessing the operational integration requirements of payloads that will fly aboard the Space Shuttle. From February 1990 to September 1991, when he started training for his third space mission, Leestma served as deputy director of Flight Crew Operations. Following this flight, he served as Deputy Chief and Acting Chief of the Astronaut Office. Leestma was selected as the Director, Flight Crew Operations Directorate, in November 1992. As Director, FCOD, he had overall responsibility for the Astronaut Office and for Johnson Space Center (JSC) Aircraft Operations. During his tenure as Director, 41 Shuttle flights and 7 Mir missions were successfully flown. He was responsible for the selection of Astronaut Groups 15, 16 and 17. While director, he oversaw the requirements, development modifications of the T-38A transition to the T-38N avionics upgrades. In September 1998, Leestma was reassigned as the deputy director, Engineering, in charge of the management of Johnson Space Center Government Furnished Equipment (GFE) Projects. In August 2001 he was assigned as the JSC Project Manager for the Space Launch Initiative, responsible for all JSC work related to the development of the new launch system. Leestma is currently serving as the Assistant Program Manager for the Orbital Space Plane Program, responsible for the vehicle systems and operations of the new crewed vehicle that is to serve as the transfer vehicle for space flight crews to and from the International Space Station.

A veteran of three space flights, Leestma has logged a total of 532.7 hours in space. He was a mission specialist on STS-41-G (October 5–13, 1984), STS-28 (August 8–13, 1989), and STS-45 (March 24 to April 2, 1992).

=== Space flight experience ===
STS-41-G Challenger, launched from Kennedy Space Center, Florida, on October 5, 1984. It was the sixth flight of the orbiter Challenger and the thirteenth flight of the Space Shuttle system. The seven-person crew also included two payload specialists: one from Canada, and one Navy oceanographer. During the mission, the crew deployed the ERBS satellite using the Remote Manipulator System (RMS), operated the OSTA-3 payload (including the SIR-B radar, FILE, and MAPS experiments) and the Large Format Camera (LFC), conducted a satellite refueling demonstration using hydrazine fuel with the Orbital Refueling System (ORS), and conducted numerous in-cabin experiments as well as activating eight "Getaway Special" canisters. Dave Leestma and Kathryn Sullivan successfully conducted a 3½ hour extravehicular activity (EVA) to demonstrate the feasibility of actual satellite refueling.

STS-28 Columbia, launched from Kennedy Space Center, Florida, on August 8, 1989. The mission carried Department of Defense payloads and a number of secondary payloads. After 80 orbits of the Earth, this five-day mission concluded with a lakebed landing on Runway 17 at Edwards Air Force Base, California, on August 13, 1989.

STS-45 Atlantis, launched from the Kennedy Space Center, Florida on March 24, 1992. During the nine-day mission, the crew operated the twelve experiments that constituted the ATLAS-1 (Atmospheric Laboratory for Applications and Science) cargo. ATLAS-1 obtained a vast array of detailed measurements of atmospheric, chemical and physical properties, which will contribute significantly to improving our understanding of our climate and atmosphere. STS-45 landed on April 2, 1992, on Runway 33 at the Kennedy Space Center, Florida, after completing 142 orbits of the Earth.
