= STS-43 =

1991 American crewed spaceflight to deploy TDRS-5

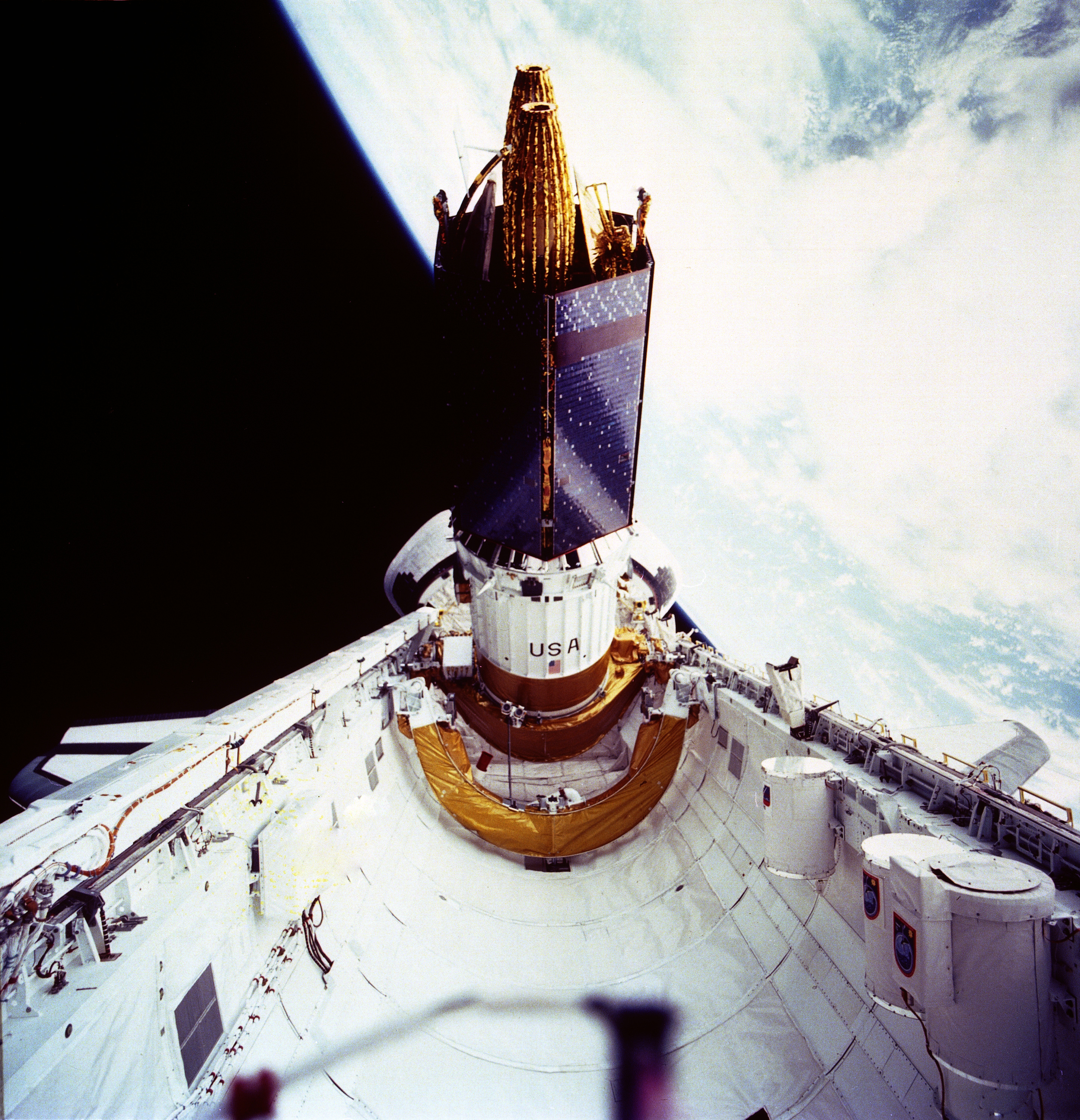
- Atlantis deploying TDRS-E.
- Names: Space Transportation System-43
- Mission type: TDRS-E satellite deployment Technology
- Operator: NASA
- COSPAR ID: 1991-054A
- SATCAT no.: 21638
- Mission duration: 8 days, 21 hours, 21 minutes, 25 seconds
- Distance travelled: 5,955,217 km (3,700,400 mi)
- Orbits completed: 142

Spacecraft properties
- Spacecraft: Space Shuttle Atlantis
- Launch mass: 117,650 kg (259,370 lb)
- Landing mass: 89,239 kg (196,738 lb)
- Payload mass: 21,067 kg (46,445 lb)

Crew
- Crew size: 5
- Members: John E. Blaha; Michael A. Baker; Shannon Lucid; G. David Low; James C. Adamson

Start of mission
- Launch date: August 2, 1991, 15:02:00 UTC (11:02 am EDT)
- Launch site: Kennedy, LC-39A
- Contractor: Rockwell International

End of mission
- Landing date: August 11, 1991, 12:23:25 UTC (8:23:25 am EDT)
- Landing site: Kennedy, SLF Runway 15

Orbital parameters
- Reference system: Geocentric orbit
- Regime: Low Earth orbit
- Perigee altitude: 301 km (187 mi)
- Apogee altitude: 306 km (190 mi)
- Inclination: 28.46°
- Period: 90.60 minutes

Instruments
- Optical Communications Through Windows (OCTW); Solid Surface Combustion Experiment (SSCE); Space Station Heat Pipe Advanced Radiator Element (SHARE II); Shuttle Solar Backscatter Ultra-Violet (SSBUV); Tank Pressure Control Equipment (TPCE)
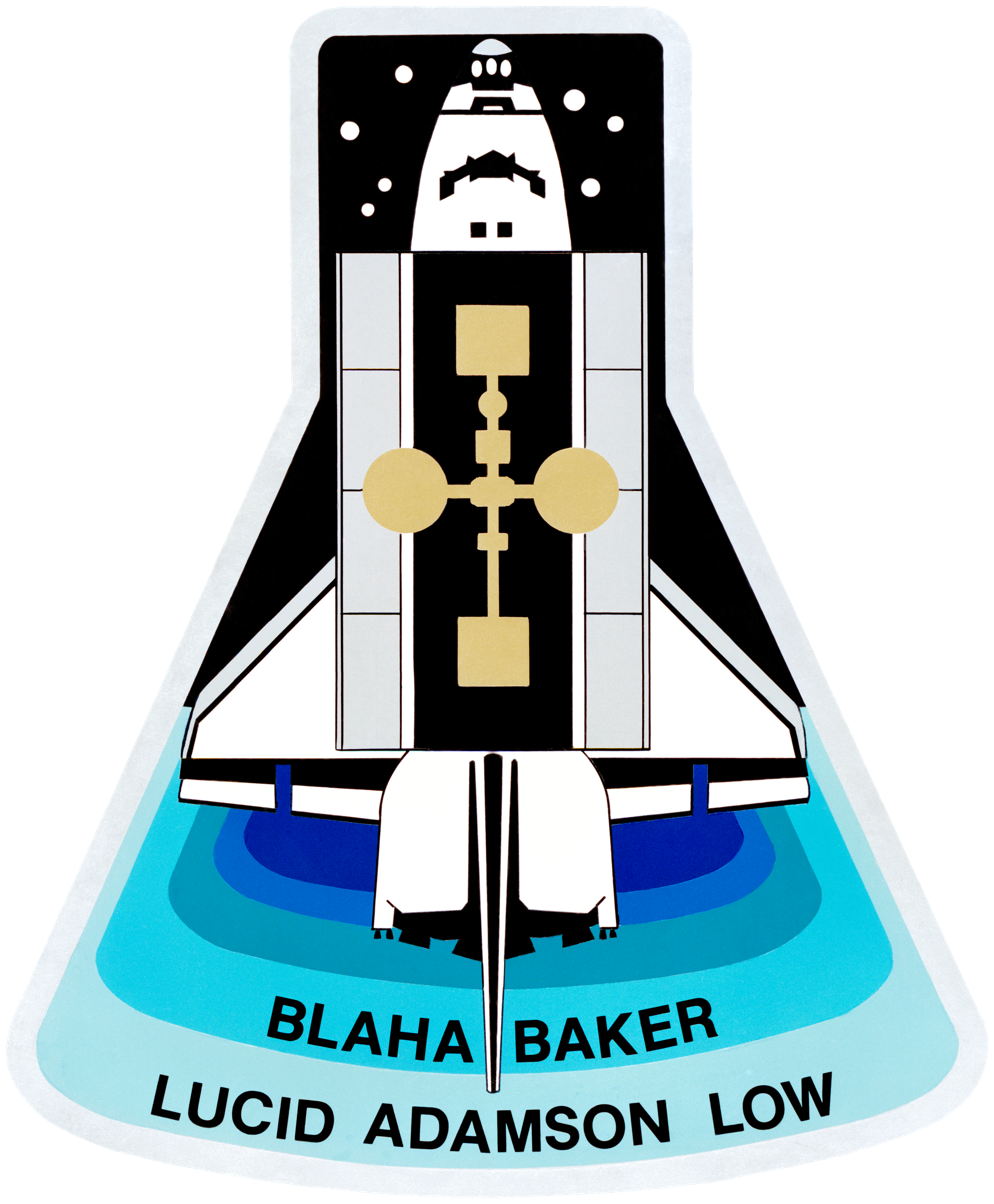
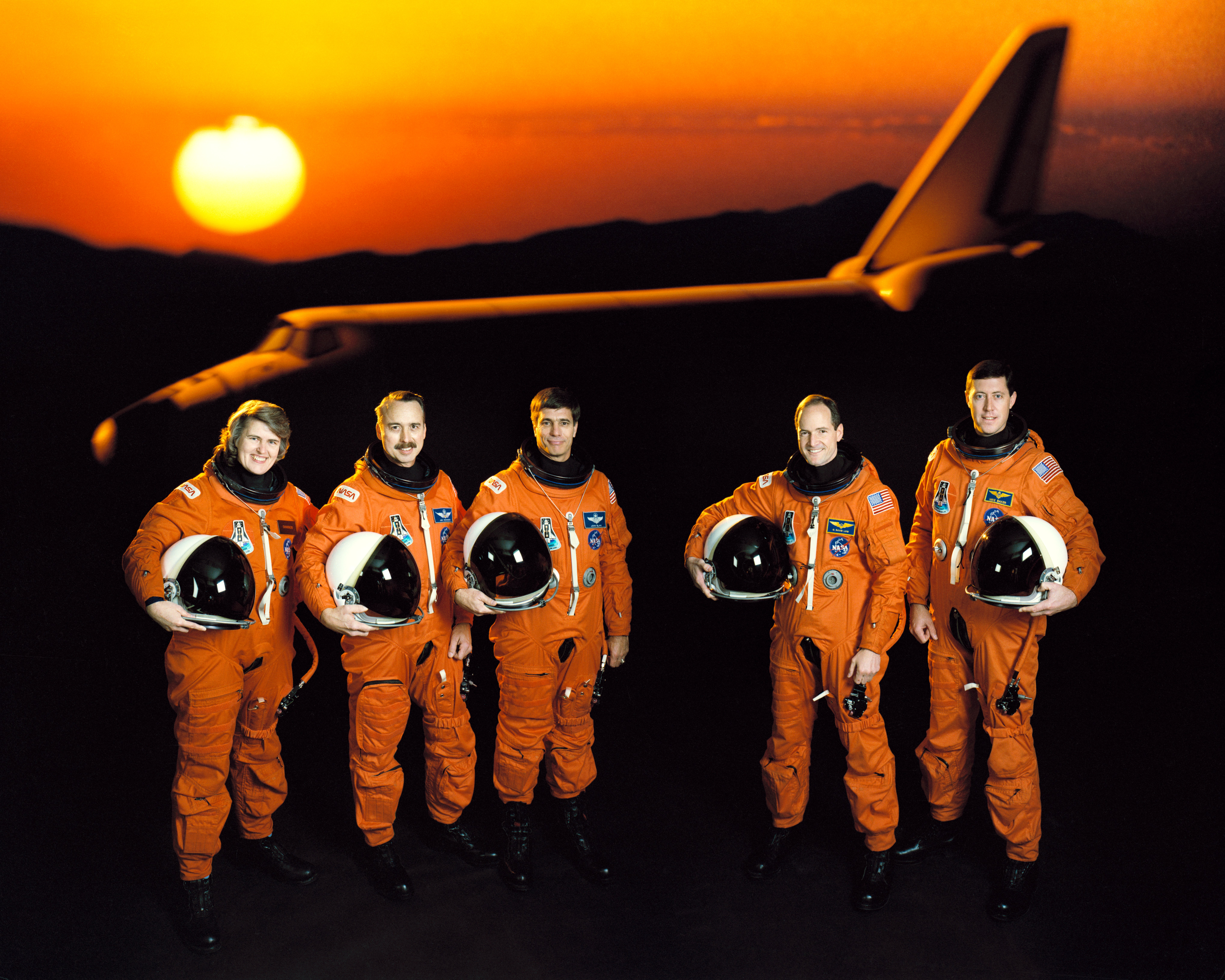
- STS-43 mission patch From left: Lucid, Adamson, Blaha, Low and Baker Space Shuttle program

STS-43, the ninth mission for Space Shuttle Atlantis, was a nine-day mission whose primary goal was launching the TDRS-E satellite (TDRS-5). The flight also tested an advanced heatpipe radiator for potential use on the then-future space station and conducted a variety of medical and materials science investigations.

== Crew ==
Position	Astronaut
Commander	John E. Blaha; Third spaceflight
Pilot	Michael A. Baker; First spaceflight
Mission Specialist 1	Shannon Lucid; Third spaceflight
Mission Specialist 2 Flight Engineer	G. David Low; Second spaceflight
Mission Specialist 3	James C. Adamson; Second and last spaceflight

=== Crew seat assignments ===
Seat	Launch	Landing	Seats 1–4 are on the flight deck. Seats 5–7 are on the mid-deck.
1	Blaha		Seats 1–4 are on the flight deck. Seats 5–7 are on the mid-deck.
2	Baker		Seats 1–4 are on the flight deck. Seats 5–7 are on the mid-deck.
3	Lucid	Adamson	Seats 1–4 are on the flight deck. Seats 5–7 are on the mid-deck.
4	Low		Seats 1–4 are on the flight deck. Seats 5–7 are on the mid-deck.
5	Adamson	Lucid	Seats 1–4 are on the flight deck. Seats 5–7 are on the mid-deck.
6	Unused		Seats 1–4 are on the flight deck. Seats 5–7 are on the mid-deck.
7	Unused		Seats 1–4 are on the flight deck. Seats 5–7 are on the mid-deck.

== Preparations and launch ==
Attempt	Planned	Result	Turnaround	Reason	Decision point	Weather go (%)	Notes
1	24 Jul 1991, 10:55:00 am	Scrubbed	—	Technical	24 Jul 1991, 6:00 am (T−03:00:00 hold)		Faulty controller on SSME 3.
2	1 Aug 1991, 11:01:00 am	Scrubbed	8 days 0 hours 6 minutes	Weather	1 Aug 1991, 12:28 pm (T−00:09:00 hold)		Problems arose when a cabin pressure vent valve gave an out-of-limit reading. A cabin pressurization test was carried out, which resolved the problem. By this time however, thunderstorms had entered the KSC area and the launch had to be scrubbed.
3	2 Aug 1991, 11:02:00 am	Success	1 day 0 hours 1 minute				

The launch took place on August 2, 1991 at 15:02:00 UTC (11:02 am EDT, local time at the launch site). Launch was originally set for July 23, 1991, but was moved to July 24 to allow time to replace a faulty integrated electronics assembly that controls orbiter/external tank separation. The mission was postponed again about five hours before liftoff on July 24, 1991, due to a faulty main engine controller on the number three main engine. The controller was replaced and retested; launch was reset for August 1, 1991. Liftoff set for 11:01 a.m. delayed due to cabin pressure vent valve reading and postponed at 12:28 p.m. due to unacceptable return-to-launch site weather conditions. Launch finally occurred on August 2, 1991, without further delays.

== Mission highlights ==
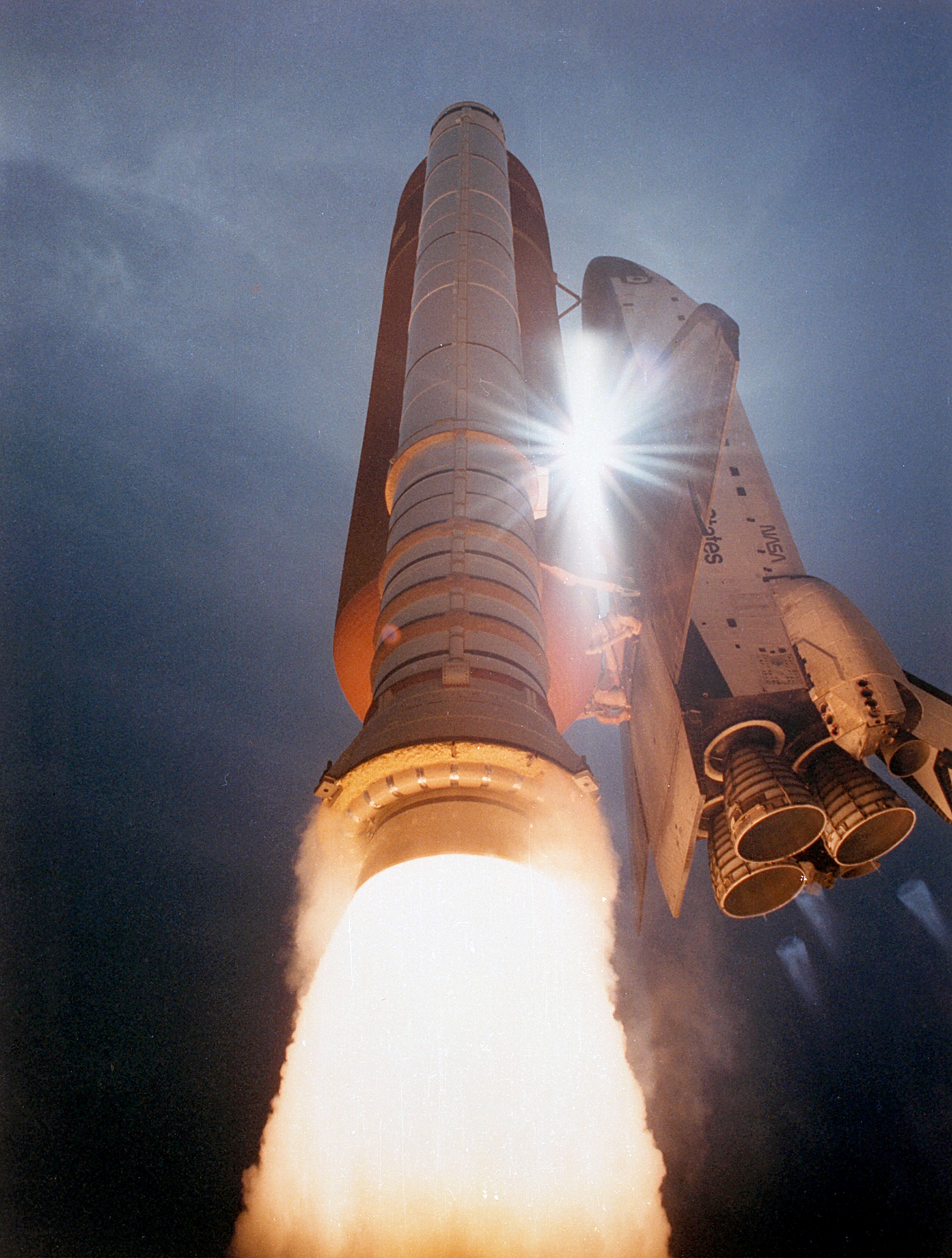
Launch of Space Shuttle Atlantis from the Kennedy Space Center

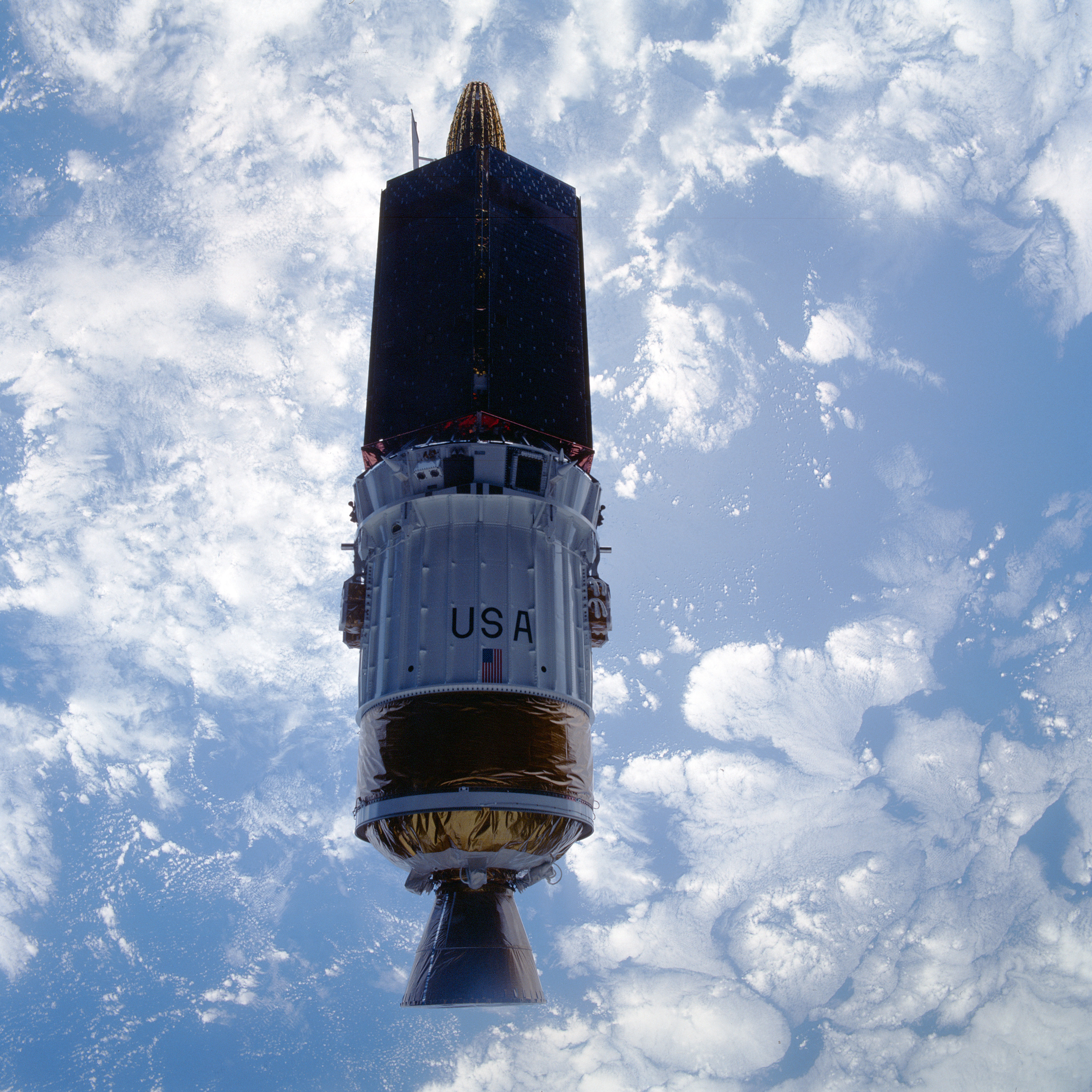
TDRS-E deployment from STS-43

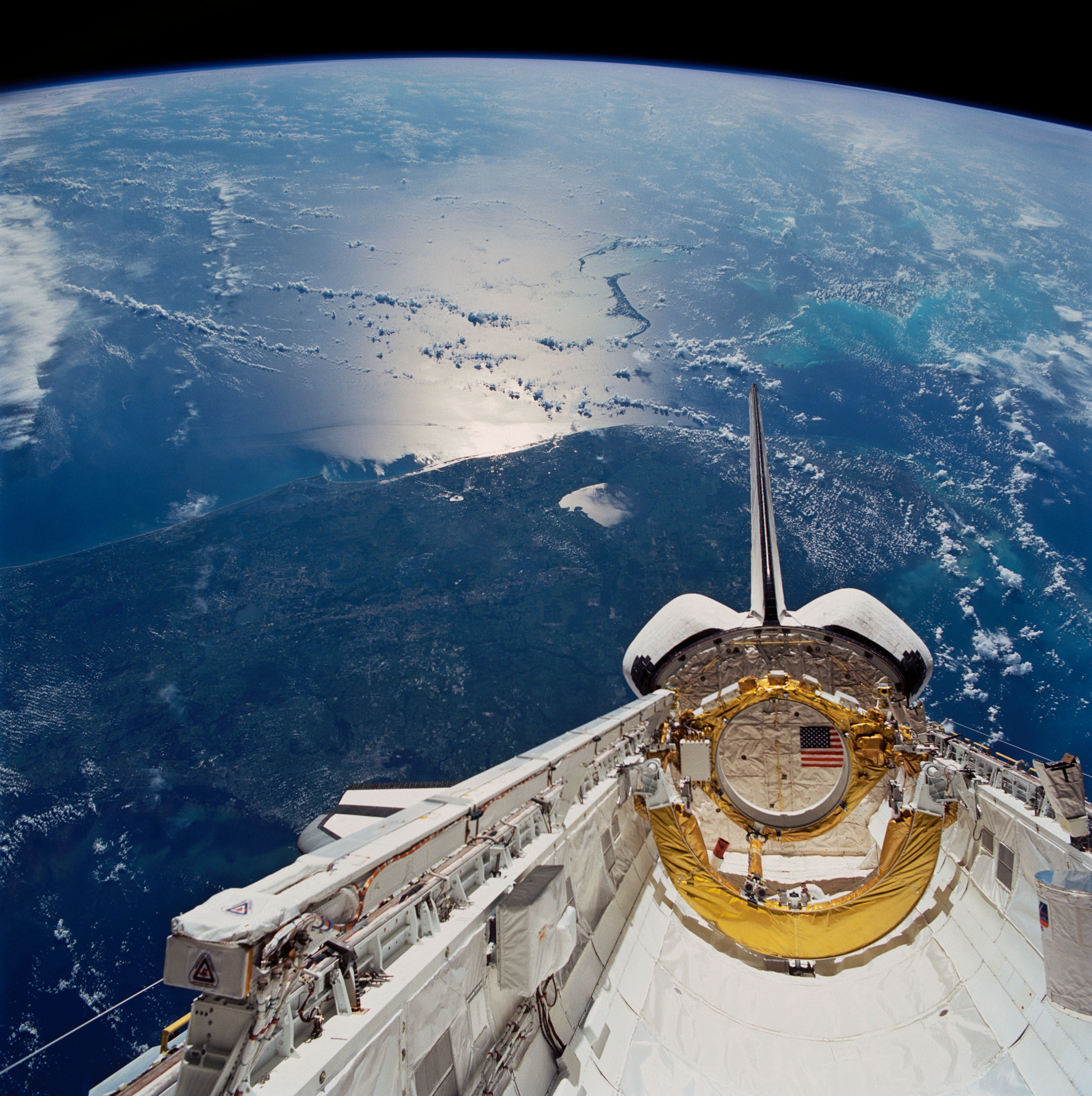
Atlantis passes over Florida. SHARE-II is prominent on the left.

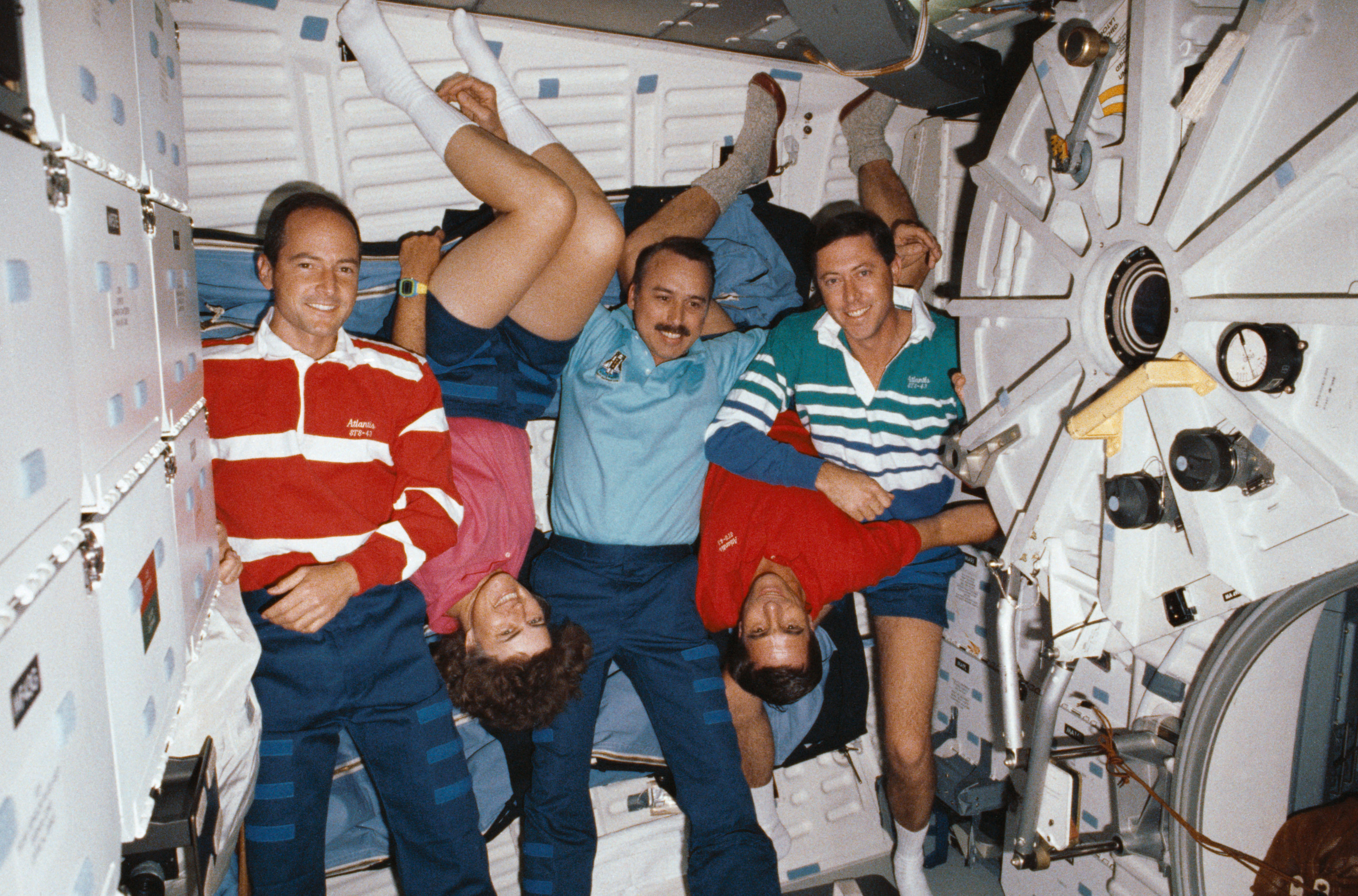
Crewmembers pose for on-orbit portrait in the middeck of Atlantis

The primary payload, TDRS-E, attached to an Inertial Upper Stage (IUS), was deployed about six hours into flight, and the IUS propelled the satellite into geosynchronous orbit. TDRS-5 became the fourth member of the orbiting TDRS cluster. Secondary payloads were Space Station Heat Pipe Advanced Radiator Element (SHARE II); Shuttle Solar Backscatter Ultra-Violet (SSBUV) instrument; Tank Pressure Control Equipment (TPCE) and Optical Communications Through Windows (OCTW). Other experiments included Auroral Photography Experiment (APE-B) Protein Crystal Growth Ill (PCG Ill); Bioserve / Instrumentation Technology Associates Materials Dispersion Apparatus (BIMDA); Investigations into Polymer Membrane Processing (IPMP); Space Acceleration Measurement System (SAMS); Solid Surface Combustion Experiment (SSCE); Ultraviolet Plume imager (UVPI); and the Air Force Maui Optical Site (AMOS) experiment.

TDRS-E, which became TDRS-5 on orbit, was successfully boosted to geosynchronous orbit at more than 22,000 miles (35,400 km (22,000 mi)) above Earth by two firings of the Inertial Upper Stage (IUS) booster, the last of which occurred approximately 12½ hours into the mission. TDRS then deployed its antennas and solar panels, and separation from the IUS took place less than 45 minutes later.

The TDRS network of satellites provides the vital communication link between Earth and low-orbiting spacecraft such as the Space Shuttle. Until the STS-43 deployment, there were three TDRS spacecraft on orbit above the equator: two were in the west position over the Pacific Ocean, southwest of Hawaii. TDRS-4 was in the east position over the northeast corner of Brazil. TDRS-B was lost in the Challenger accident in 1986. After STS-43, the two satellites in the west became on-orbit spares; TDRS-5, after activation, checkout and calibration, officially became the primary provider of services in the west location on October 7, 1991. It was stationed at 175° west longitude.

Previously, orbiting spacecraft could communicate with Earth only when in sight of a ground tracking station – about 15 percent of each orbit. The TDRS network allows communication from 85% to 100% of an orbit, depending on the spacecraft's altitude.

The crew was kept busy with the operation of varied experiments during the nine-day flight. The Space Station Heat Pipe Advanced Radiator Element (SHARE-II) experiment tested a natural cooling process for transferring thermal energy that could serve as a cooling system for Space Station Freedom. The Solid Surface Combustion Experiment (SSCE) provided some answers about how fire behaves in microgravity. The crew also activated other previously flown materials science experiments and participated in medical experiments in support of long-duration flights. One test showed that optical fibers could provide video and audio links between the flight deck and the payload bay.

Crew members in space and flight controllers on the ground demonstrated their ingenuity when they adapted a camera part to replace one that had not been packed for the mission.

The mission was also notable for being the first one to send an email from space. On August 9, 1991, astronauts Lucid and Adamson used AppleLink to write an email from a Macintosh Portable addressed to Marsha S. Ivins at Johnson Space Center. The message read:

Hello Earth! Greetings from the STS-43 crew. This is the first AppleLink from space. Having a GREAT time, wish you were here, ... send cryo and RCS! Hasta la vista, baby, ... we'll be back!

The crew experienced some minor problems, none of them critical to the safety or success of the mission. A cooling system for Auxiliary Power Unit (APU 2) failed to activate during an on-orbit test. APU 2 is one of three redundant systems which provide hydraulic pressurization to orbiter steering systems during entry and landing. APU 2 was still available for use in landing.

Atlantis landed on August 11, 1991, at 8:23:25 a.m. EDT, on Runway 15, at Kennedy Space Center.

== Mission insignia ==
According to the mission's official Press Kit, the STS-43 insignia portrays the evolution and continuity of the U.S. space program by highlighting thirty years of American crewed spaceflight experience, from Project Mercury to the Space Shuttle. The emergence of the shuttle Atlantis from the outlined configuration of the Mercury space capsule commemorates this special relationship. The energy and momentum of launch are conveyed by the gradations of blue which mark the shuttle's ascent from Earth to space. Once in Earth orbit, Atlantis' cargo bay opens to reveal the Tracking and Data Relay Satellite (TDRS) which appears in gold emphasis against the white wings of Atlantis and the stark blackness of space. As primary mission objective, the Tracking and Data Relay Satellite System (TDRSS) will enable almost continuous communication from Earth to space for future space shuttle missions. The stars on the insignia are arranged to suggest this mission's numerical designation, with four stars left of Atlantis and three to the right.

== Wake-up calls ==
NASA began a tradition of playing music to astronauts during the Project Gemini, and first used music to wake up a flight crew during Apollo 15. Each track is specially chosen, often by the astronauts' families, and usually has a special meaning to an individual member of the crew, or is applicable to their daily activities.

Day	Song	Artist/Composer	Played for
2	Back in the High Life	Steve Winwood	
3	Excerpts from "Dances with the Wolves" soundtrack		James Adamson
4	Custom music medley sung by friends of the STS-43 crew from Rockwell-Downey, in California.		
5	Music of the Clear Lake High School Orchestra playing selections from "Phantom of the Opera". Commander John Blaha's daughter, Caroline, plays in the orchestra.	Andrew Lloyd Webber	John Blaha
6	What a Wonderful World	Louis Armstrong	
7	Cowboy in the Continental Suit	Chris LeDoux	James Adamson
8	Washington and Lee University fight song		G. David Low
9	Sounds from Shannon Lucid's backyard		

== See also ==
- List of human spaceflights
- List of Space Shuttle missions
- Outline of space science
- Space Shuttle
