= TDRS-5 =

American communications satellite

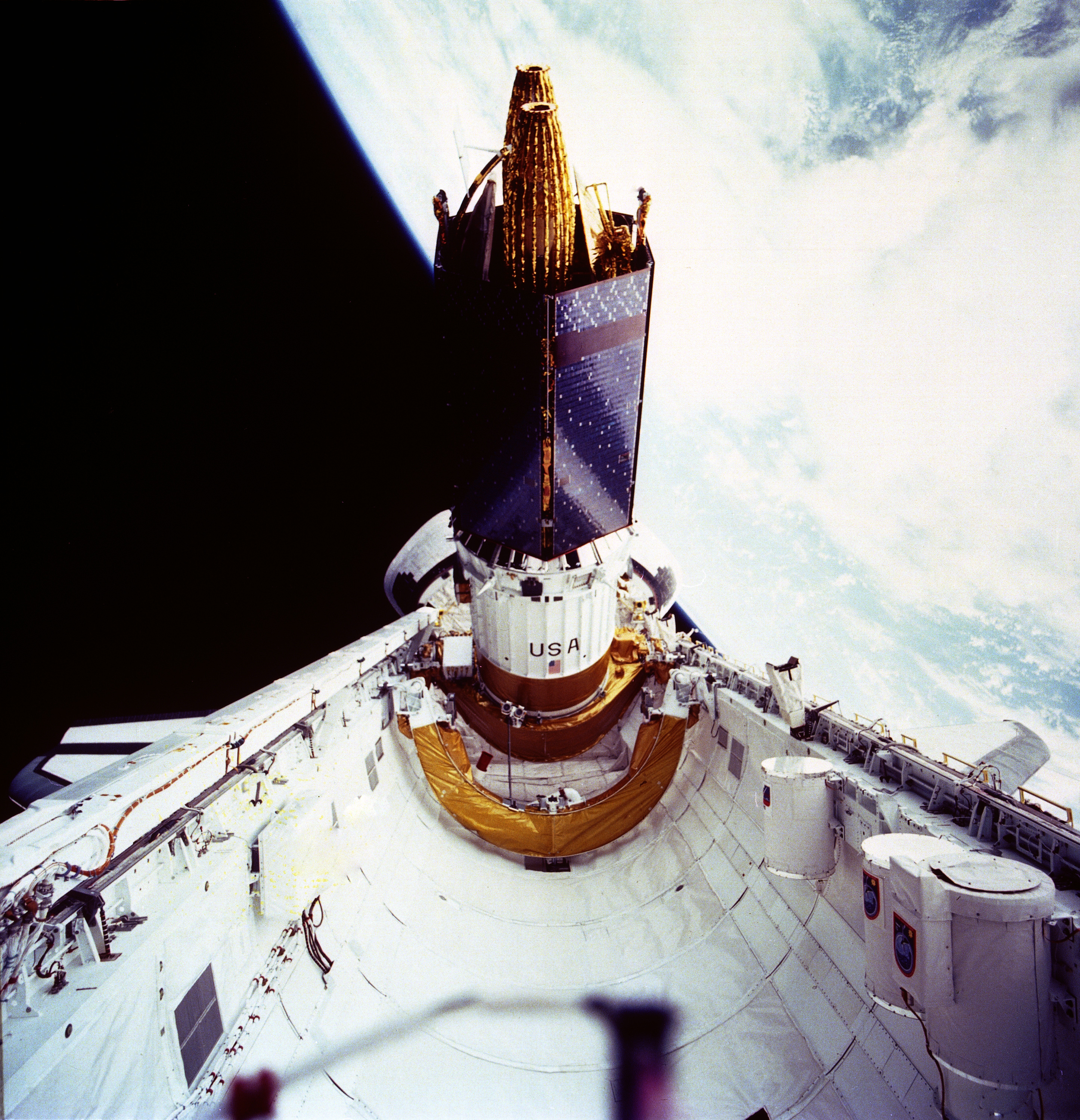
- TDRS-E aboard Atlantis during deployment
- Mission type: Communication
- Operator: NASA
- COSPAR ID: 1991-054B
- SATCAT no.: 21639
- Mission duration: Planned: 10 years Elapsed: 35 years, 2 months, 14 days

Spacecraft properties
- Bus: TDRS
- Manufacturer: TRW
- Launch mass: 2,108 kg (4,647 lb)
- Dimensions: 17.3 × 14.2 m (57 × 47 ft)
- Power: 1700 watts

Start of mission
- Launch date: 2 August 1991, 15:01:59 UTC
- Rocket: Space Shuttle Atlantis; STS-43 / IUS
- Launch site: Kennedy Space Center, LC-39A
- Contractor: Rockwell International

Orbital parameters
- Reference system: Geocentric orbit
- Regime: Geostationary orbit
- Longitude: 174° West (1991–)
- Epoch: 3 August 1991

TDRS-5, known before launch as TDRS-E, is an American communications satellite, of first generation, which is operated by NASA as part of the Tracking and Data Relay Satellite System. It was constructed by TRW is based on a custom satellite bus which was used for all seven first generation TDRS satellites.

== History ==
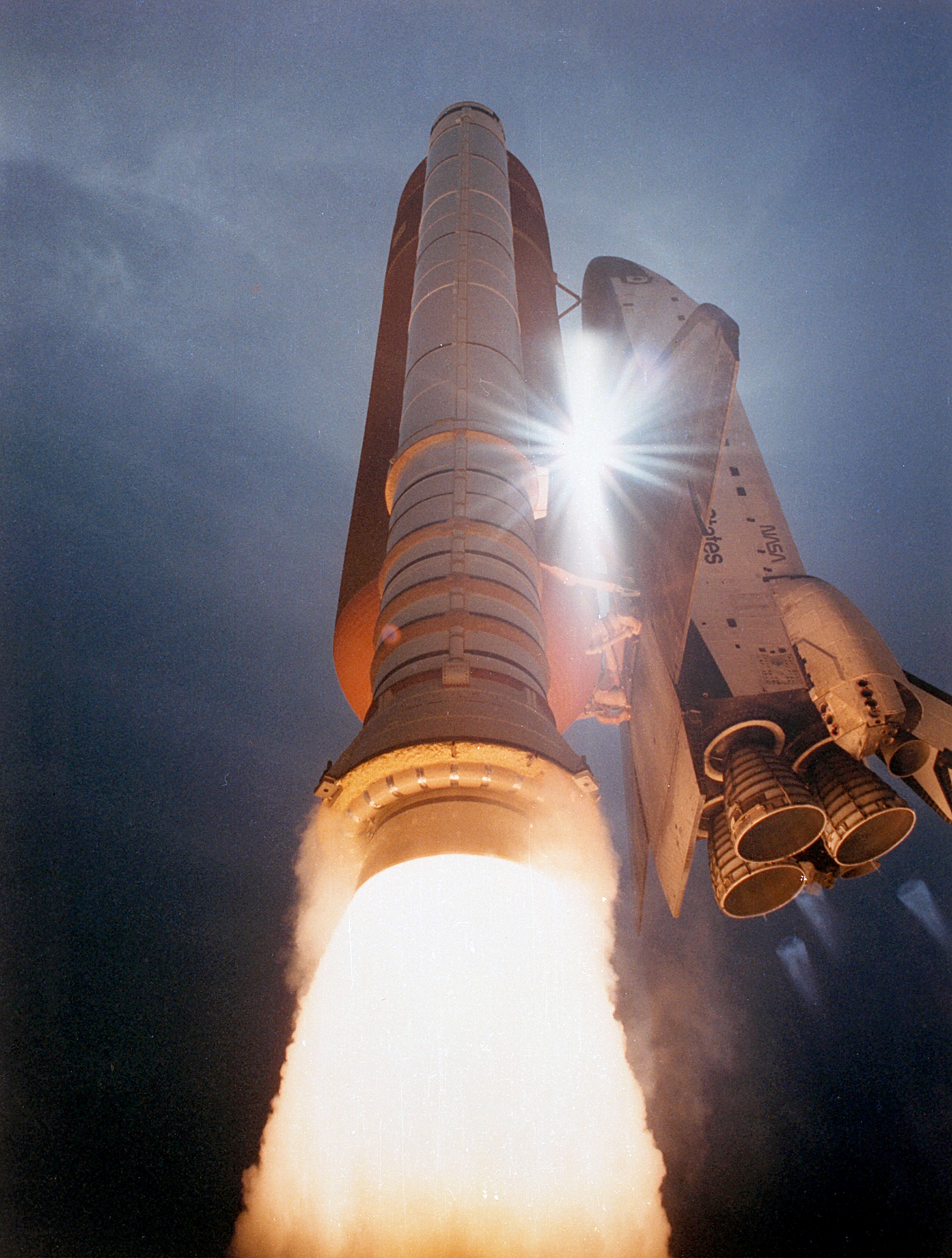
The launch of STS-43, carrying TDRS-E

It was launched aboard Space Shuttle Atlantis during the STS-43 mission. Atlantis launched from Launch Complex 39A at the Kennedy Space Center on 2 August 1991 at 15:01:59 UTC (11:01:59 EDT). TDRS-E was deployed from Atlantis around six hours after launch, and was raised to geostationary orbit by means of an Inertial Upper Stage. It was the only TDRS satellite to be deployed from Atlantis.

=== Deployment ===
The twin-stage solid-propellent Inertial Upper Stage made two burns. The first stage burn occurred shortly after deployment, from Atlantis, and placed the satellite into a geostationary transfer orbit (GTO). Around six hours later, it reached apogee, and the second stage fired, placing TDRS-E into geosynchronous orbit. At this point, it received its operational designation, TDRS-5. It was placed at a position over the equator, 174.0° West of the Greenwich Meridian, from where it provides communications services to spacecraft in Earth orbit, including the Space Shuttle and International Space Station.

Location of TDRS as of 26 May 2020

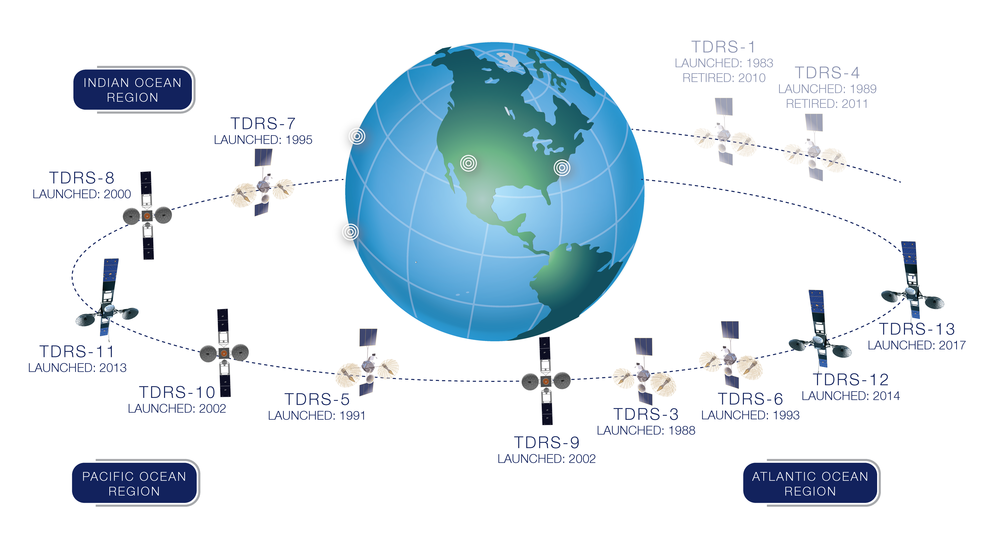
Location of TDRS as of 18 March 2019

== See also ==
- List of TDRS satellites
