= Joseph W. Schmitt =

NASA space suit technician

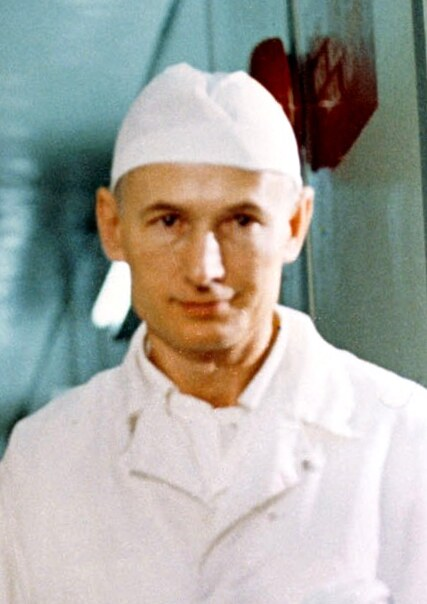
Joseph W. Schmitt, in 1962.

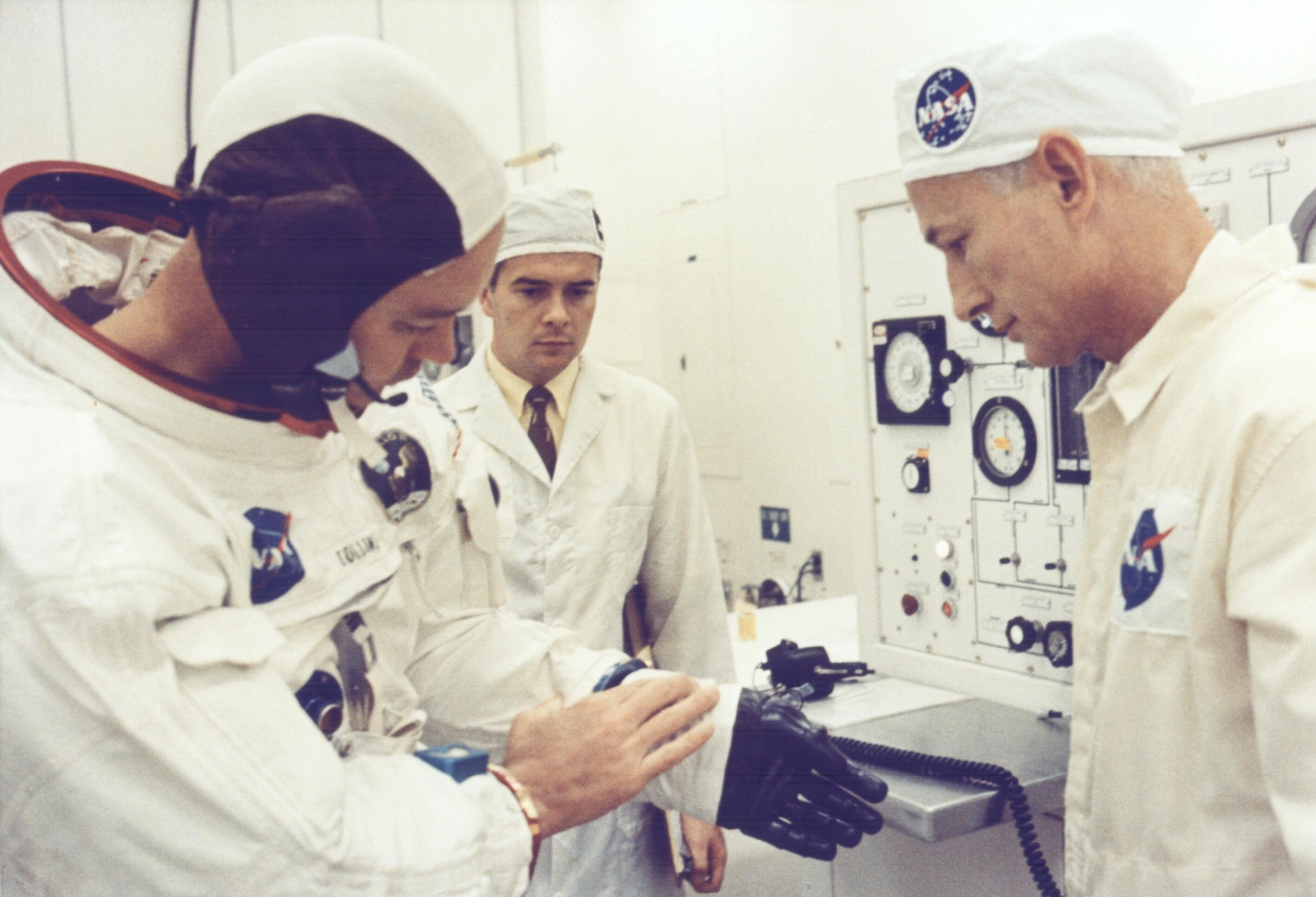
Michael Collins and Joseph W. Schmitt, Apollo 11

Joseph W. Schmitt (January 2, 1916 – September 25, 2017) was a spacesuit technician for the National Aeronautics and Space Administration human space exploration program in the 1960s and 70s. As "suit tech", he was on close terms with the astronauts and was usually the last person to have direct contact with them before their missions. Schmitt suited up Alan Shepard for his mission at the beginning of Project Mercury and continued to work on the Gemini, Apollo and Skylab programs, ending his career during the early Space Shuttle Program. As an essential part of the final stages of preparation for space flight, Schmitt was depicted in many photographs, leading to his inclusion in two works on the subject by Norman Rockwell.

== Early life ==
Joseph William Schmitt was born on January 2, 1916, in O'Fallon, Illinois, to Benjamin Schmitt and Apollonia Berkel Schmitt. His father, a town marshal, was killed on duty shortly after Joseph's birth.

== Career ==
In the 1930s Joseph joined the Army Air Corps, becoming an aircraft mechanic. Finding that this work was not sufficiently interesting, he learned to be a parachute rigger and repaired flight clothing. When he left the Army in 1939 he joined the National Advisory Committee for Aeronautics as an aircraft mechanic. In this capacity Schmitt was involved in Chuck Yeager's 1947 flight that broke the sound barrier. When NASA started its crewed space flight program Schmitt became an equipment specialist, working with the astronauts' flight suits after NASA realized that Schmitt's experience was invaluable. In 1958 Schmitt became the chief spacesuit technician for NASA, working with B.F. Goodrich to develop a practical spacesuit. After the Mercury and Gemini programs, Schmitt helped to develop the suits worn by astronauts on the Moon during the Apollo program. Schmitt worked through the Apollo and Skylab programs and into the early Space Shuttle program, finally retiring in 1983.

Shortly after the end of the Mercury flights Schmitt appeared on the television game show What's My Line in May 1963. The panel was not able to determine his exact role, but did establish that he was part of the space program. In 1965 Norman Rockwell painted a picture of Gus Grissom and John Young suiting up for Gemini 3. Working from photographs, Rockwell depicted Schmitt assisting Young. Schmitt brought a spacesuit to Rockwell's studio to help Rockwell with the details of the suits, and Rockwell painted Schmitt in two different paintings.

Joseph W. Schmitt assisted Neil Armstrong, Buzz Aldrin and Michael Collins before the start of Apollo 11; he is also seen in the 2019 documentary Apollo 11.

== Personal life ==
Schmitt married Elizabeth Ann Rayfield in 1939. He died on September 25, 2017, at a nursing home in Friendswood, Texas, aged 101.

== See also ==
- Sharon Caples McDougle
