= STS-47 =

1992 American crewed spaceflight

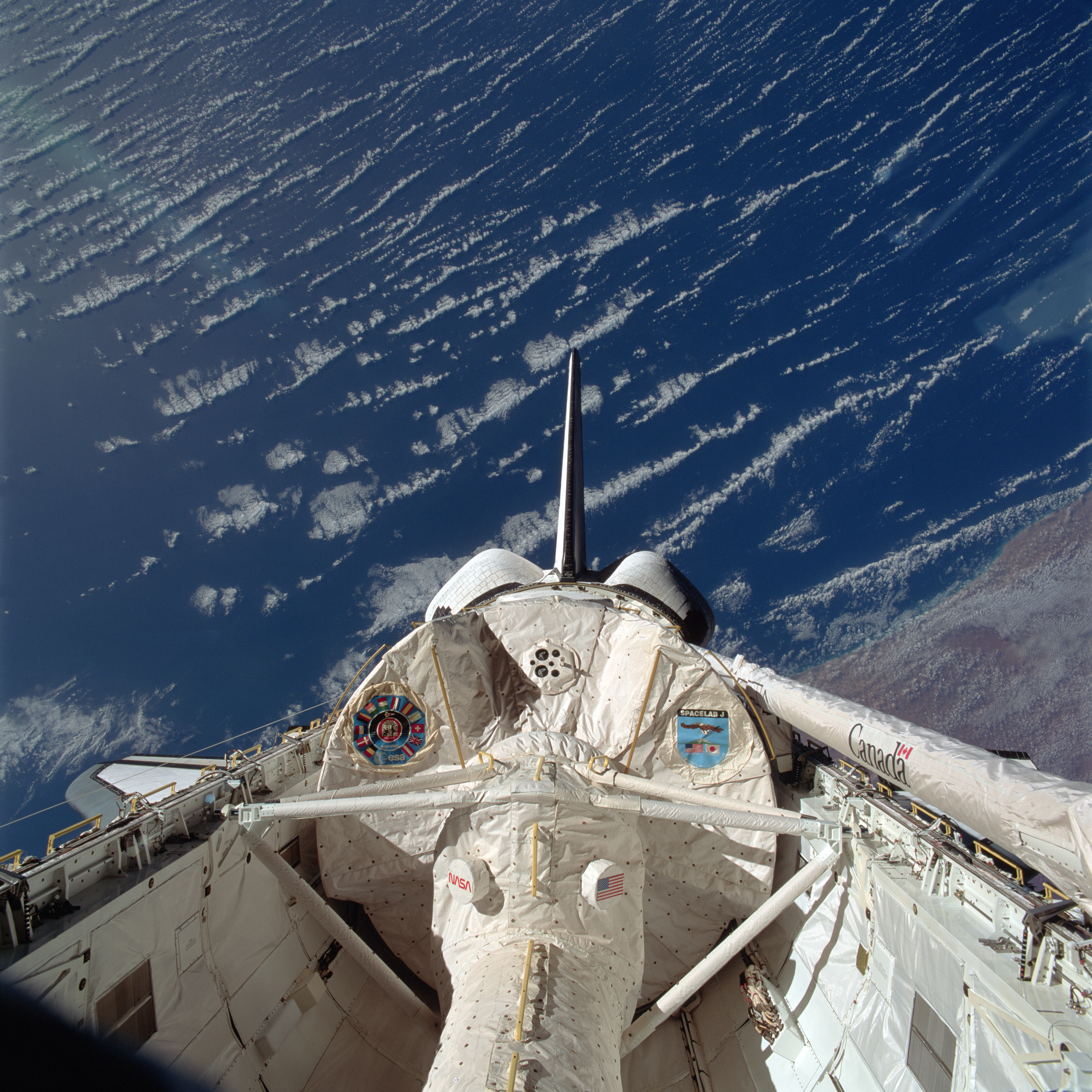
- Spacelab Module LM2 in Endeavour's payload bay, serving as the Spacelab-J laboratory.
- Names: Space Transportation System-47; Spacelab-J
- Mission type: Microgravity research
- Operator: NASA
- COSPAR ID: 1992-061A
- SATCAT no.: 22120
- Mission duration: 7 days, 22 hours, 30 minutes, 24 seconds
- Distance travelled: 5,265,523 km (3,271,844 mi)
- Orbits completed: 126

Spacecraft properties
- Spacecraft: Space Shuttle Endeavour
- Launch mass: 117,335 kg (258,679 lb)
- Landing mass: 99,450 kg (219,250 lb)
- Payload mass: 12,485 kg (27,525 lb)

Crew
- Crew size: 7
- Members: Robert L. Gibson; Curtis Brown; Mark C. Lee; Jerome Apt; Jan Davis; Mae Jemison; Mamoru Mohri

Start of mission
- Launch date: September 12, 1992, 14:23:00 UTC (10:23 am EDT)
- Launch site: Kennedy, LC-39B
- Contractor: Rockwell International

End of mission
- Landing date: September 20, 1992, 12:53:24 UTC (8:53:24 am EDT)
- Landing site: Kennedy, SLF Runway 33

Orbital parameters
- Reference system: Geocentric orbit
- Regime: Low Earth orbit
- Perigee altitude: 297 km (185 mi)
- Apogee altitude: 310 km (190 mi)
- Inclination: 57.02°
- Period: 90.00 minutes

Instruments
- Air Force Maui Optical Station (AMOS); Israel Space Agency Investigation About Hornets (ISAIAH); Shuttle Amateur Radio Experiment (SAREX-II); Solid Surface Combustion Experiment (SSCE); Ultraviolet Plume Imager (UVPI)
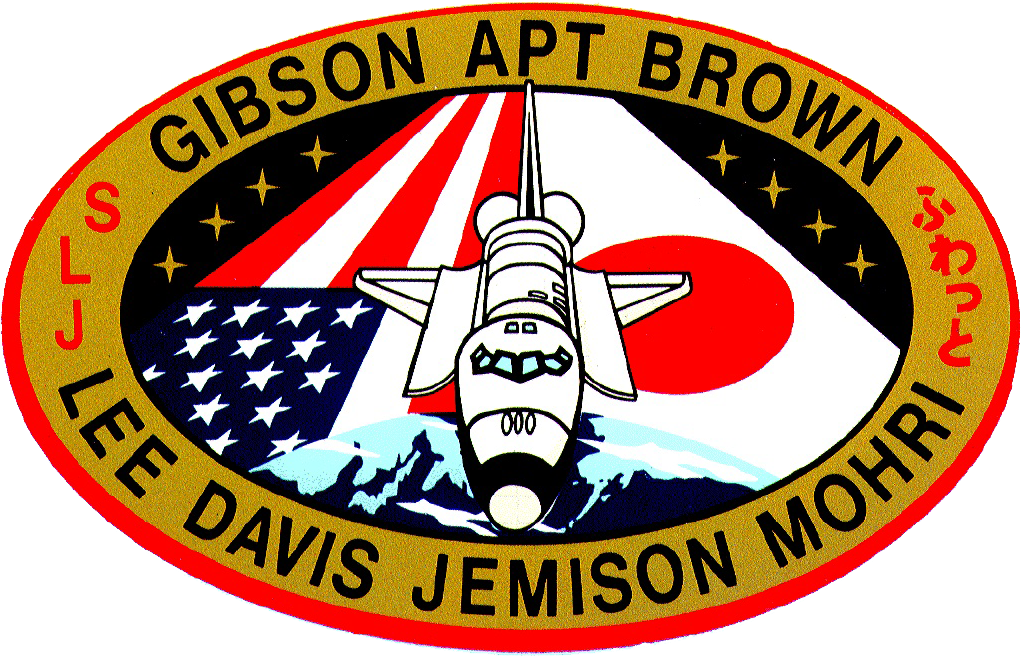
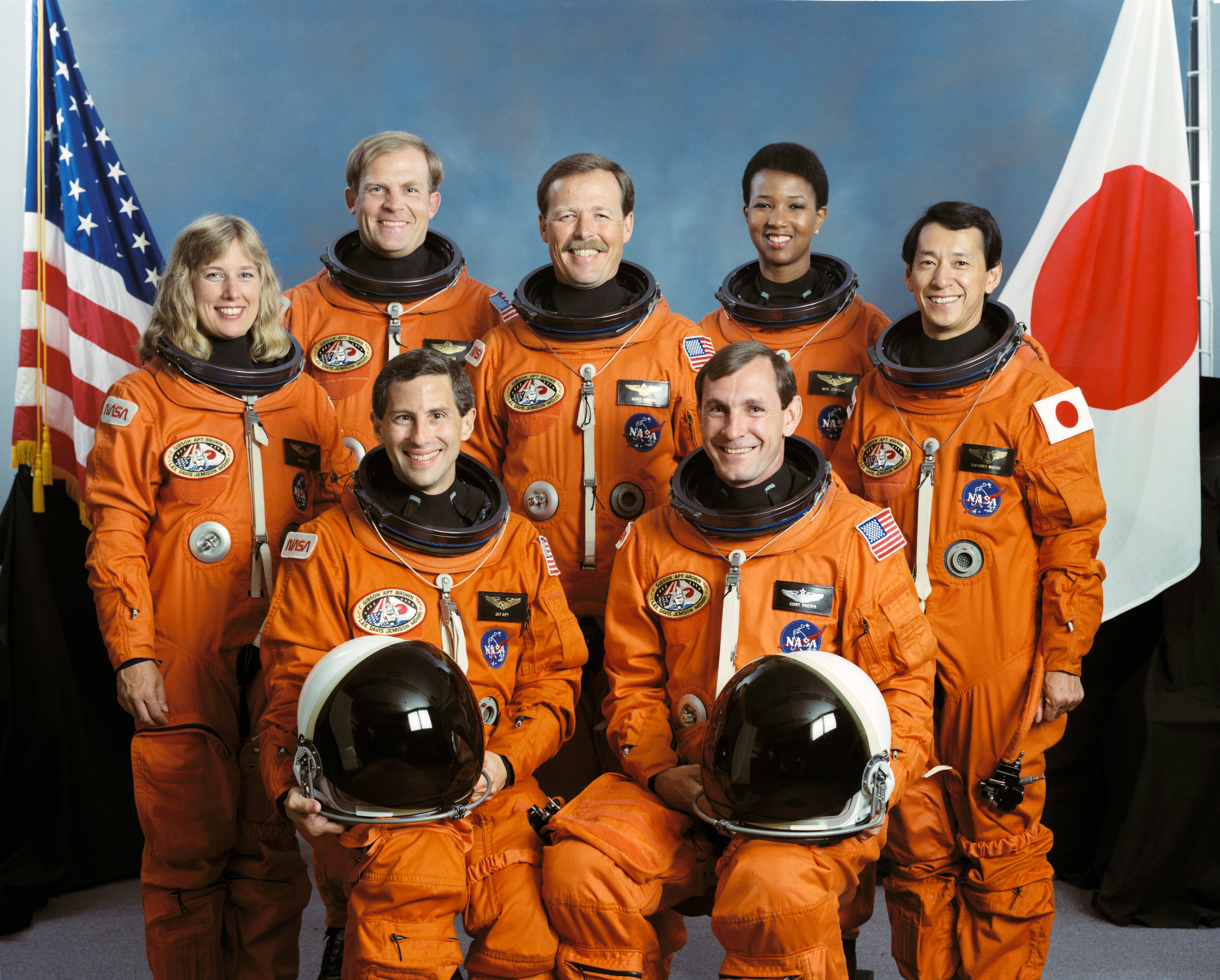
- STS-47 mission patch Back row: Davis, Lee, Gibson, Jemison, Mohri; Front row: Apt, Brown Space Shuttle program

STS-47 was NASA's 50th Space Shuttle mission of the program, as well as the second mission of the Space Shuttle Endeavour. The mission mainly involved conducting experiments in life and material sciences inside Spacelab-J, a collaborative laboratory inside the shuttle's payload bay sponsored by NASA and the National Space Development Agency of Japan (NASDA). This mission carried Mamoru Mohri, the first Japanese astronaut aboard the shuttle, Mae Jemison, the first African-American woman to go to space, and the only married couple to fly together on the shuttle, Mark C. Lee and Jan Davis, which had been against NASA policy prior to this mission.

== Crew ==
Position	Astronaut
Commander	(United States) Robert L. Gibson; Fourth spaceflight
Pilot	(United States) Curtis Brown; First spaceflight
Mission Specialist 1	(United States) Mark C. Lee; Second spaceflight
Mission Specialist 2 Flight Engineer	(United States) Jerome Apt; Second spaceflight
Mission Specialist 3	(United States) Jan Davis; First spaceflight
Mission Specialist 4	(United States) Mae Jemison; Only spaceflight
Payload Specialist 1	(Japan) Mamoru Mohri, NASDA; First spaceflight
Member of Blue Team; Member of Red Team

As female and male astronauts became more prominently integrated with the shuttle program, NASA enacted an unwritten rule that husband/wife couples would not be assigned to the same mission. However, when Lee and Davis's marriage became known to NASA officials in January 1991, the officials decided to keep the assignment as is, given that both crewmembers already had important roles within the upcoming mission. When asked at a NASA press conference if intimate activities would be taking place on the mission, Davis denied that possibility.

=== Backup crew ===
Official NASA portrait of Dr. Stanley N. Koszelak

=== Backup crew ===
Position	Astronaut
Payload Specialist	(Japan) Chiaki Mukai, NASDA
Payload Specialist	(Japan) Takao Doi, NASDA
Payload Specialist	(United States) Stanley N. Koszelak – Backup Payload Specialist.

=== Crew seat assignments ===
Seat	Launch	Landing	Seats 1–4 are on the flight deck. Seats 5–7 are on the mid-deck.
1	Gibson		Seats 1–4 are on the flight deck. Seats 5–7 are on the mid-deck.
2	Brown		Seats 1–4 are on the flight deck. Seats 5–7 are on the mid-deck.
3	Lee	Davis	Seats 1–4 are on the flight deck. Seats 5–7 are on the mid-deck.
4	Apt		Seats 1–4 are on the flight deck. Seats 5–7 are on the mid-deck.
5	Davis	Lee	Seats 1–4 are on the flight deck. Seats 5–7 are on the mid-deck.
6	Jemison		Seats 1–4 are on the flight deck. Seats 5–7 are on the mid-deck.
7	Mohri		Seats 1–4 are on the flight deck. Seats 5–7 are on the mid-deck.

== Mission highlights ==
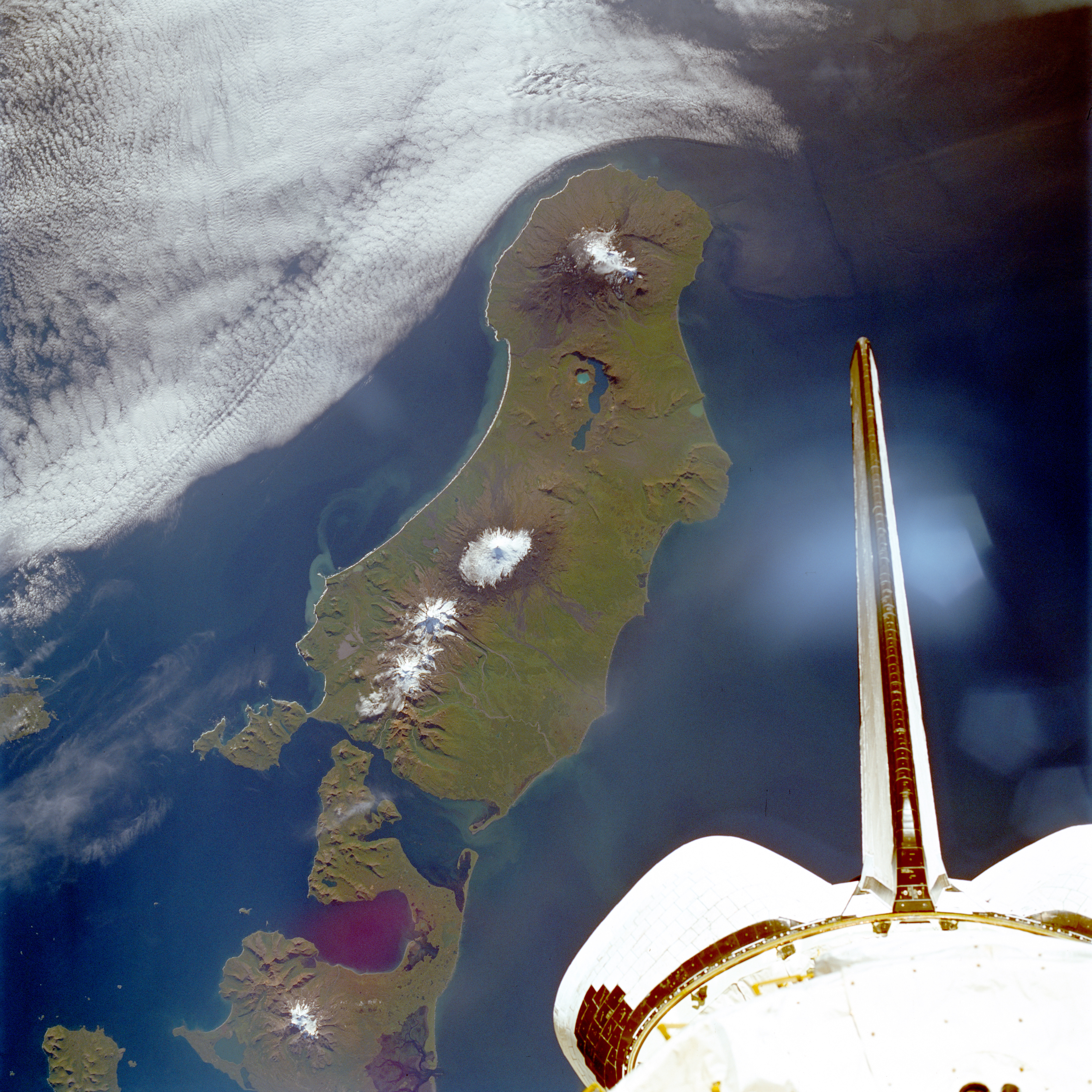
Unimak Island as seen from Endeavour.

At the beginning of September, a problem with an oxygen line in the shuttle's main propulsion system was identified, however, it was resolved without forcing a postponement of the mission.

STS-47 launched from Pad 39B at 10:23:00 a.m. EDT on September 12, 1992, and was the first on-time mission without launch delays since STS-61-B in 1985.

The mission's primary payload was Spacelab-J — a joint mission between NASA and the National Space Development Agency of Japan (NASDA) — which used a crewed Spacelab module to conduct microgravity research in materials and life sciences. Like many previous missions, the international crew was divided into red and blue teams which would work in two 12-hour shifts for around-the-clock operations. Brown, Lee, and Mohri were assigned to the red team, and would conduct experiments while Apt, Davis, and Jemison, assigned to the blue team, would rest, and vice versa. As the mission commander, Gibson was free to work with both teams. Because of the 24-hour schedule, the crew wasn't sent any traditional wake-up calls by mission control.

Spacelab-J included 24 experiments in materials science and 20 life sciences experiments, the majority of which were sponsored by NASDA and NASA, while 2 were sponsored by collaborative civilian efforts. The Payload Crew Training Manager was Homer Hickam, who also worked during the mission as a Crew Interface Coordinator to talk to the crew during their science experiments and relay any concerns from the scientists on the ground.

Materials science investigations covered such fields as biotechnology, electronic materials, fluid dynamics and transport phenomena, glass and ceramics, metals and alloys, and acceleration measurements. Life sciences included experiments on human health, cell separation and biology, developmental biology, animal and human physiology and behavior, space radiation, and biological rhythms. Test subjects included the crew, Japanese koi fish (carp), cultured animal and plant cells, chicken embryos, fruit flies, fungi, plant seeds, frogs and frog eggs, and oriental hornets.

Jemison and Japanese astronaut Mamoru Mohri were trained to use the Autogenic Feedback Training Exercise (AFTE), a technique developed by Patricia S. Cowings that uses biofeedback and autogenic training to help patients monitor and control their physiology as a possible treatment for motion sickness, anxiety and stress-related disorders.

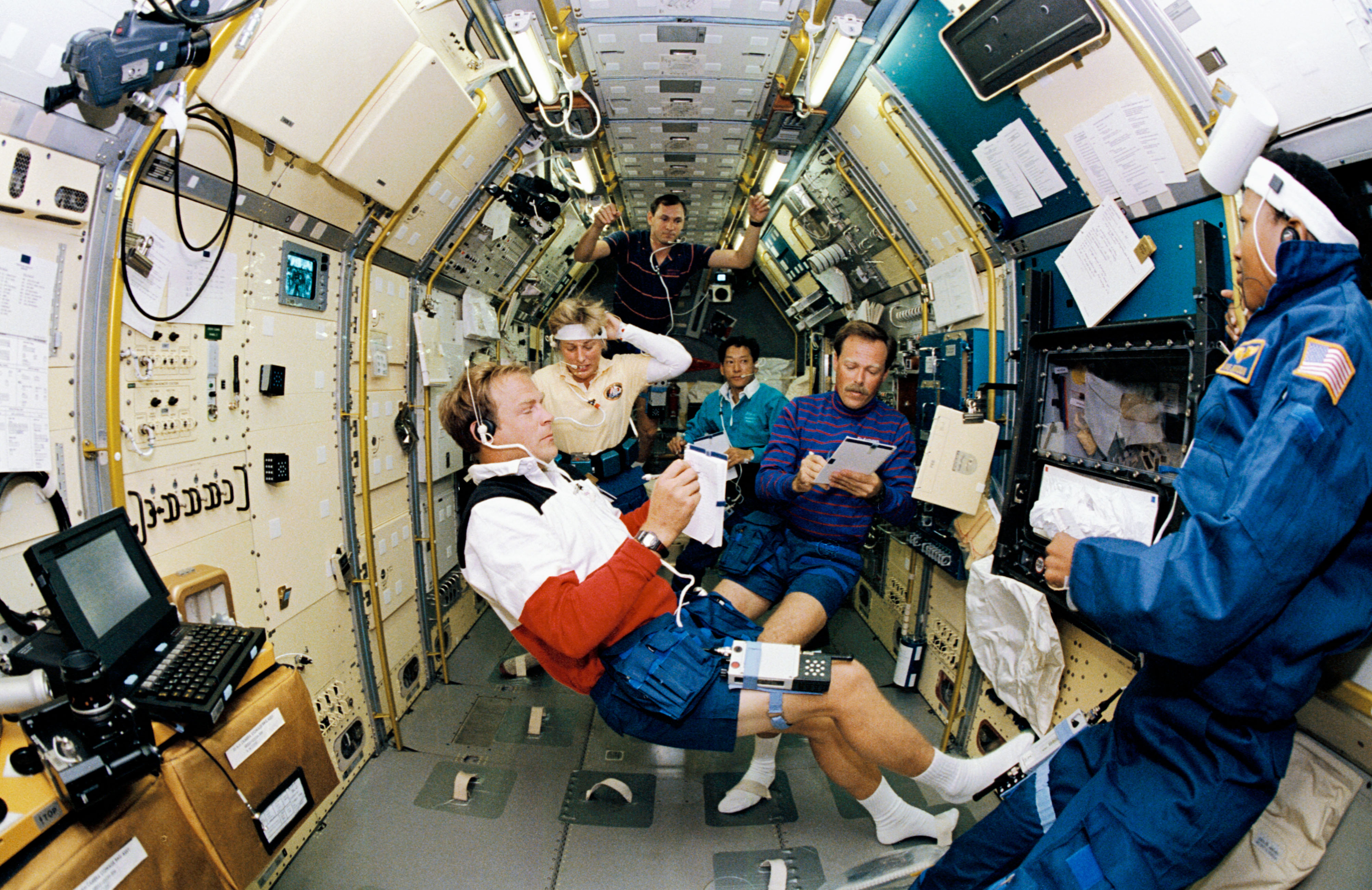
STS-47 Endeavour crewmembers inside Spacelab

Aboard the Spacelab Japan module, Jemison tested NASA's Fluid Therapy System, a set of procedures and equipment to produce water for injection, developed by Sterimatics Corporation. She then used IV bags and a mixing method, developed by Baxter Healthcare, to use the water from the previous step to produce saline solution in space. Jemison was also a co-investigator of two bone cell research experiments. Another experiment she participated in was to induce female frogs to ovulate, fertilize the eggs, and then see how tadpoles developed in zero gravity.

=== Secondary Experiments ===
On the middeck, a variety of experiments were conducted, including the Israel Space Agency Investigation About Hornets (ISAIAH), the Solid Surface Combustion Experiment (SSCE), and the Shuttle Amateur Radio Experiment (SAREX II). External experiments using the Ultraviolet Plume Imager (UVPI) on the LACE satellite and observations at the Air Force Maui Optical Station (AMOS) were also conducted while Endeavour was in orbit.

ISAIAH was the first microgravity experiment flown for the Israel Space Agency (ISA). Originating from Tel-Aviv University, it was intended to observe the effects of microgravity on oriental hornets and their ability to build combs in zero-g. However, a failure in the water system resulted in an unexpected rise of the humidity level in the experiment, which resulted in the deaths of 202 out of the 230 hornets and 103 pupae out of the 120 in the experiment. While some of the hornets in the bottom container of the experiment remained active through flight day 7, no new nests were created until after the mission's completion, and the average lifespan of the hornets that flew into space was considerably less than that of the control group. None of the hornet pupae that flew into space metamorphized.

Twelve Get Away Special (GAS) canisters (10 with experiments, 2 with ballast) were carried in the payload bay. Among the GAS canisters was G-102, sponsored by the Boy Scouts of America's Exploring Division in cooperation with the TRW Systems Integration Group, Fairfax, Virginia. The project was named Project POSTAR and was the first space experiment created entirely by members of the Boy Scouts of America.

Also on board were two experiments prepared by Ashford School of Art & Design in Kent, United Kingdom, which, at the time, was a girls-only school. The school had won a competition run by Independent Television News. The experiments were contained in G-520. The first one injected a few grams of cobalt nitrate crystals to a sodium silicate to create a chemical garden in weightless condition. The growths, which were photographed 66 times as they developed, spread out in random directions, twisted, and, in some cases, formed spirals. A second experiment to investigate how Liesegang rings formed in space failed to operate correctly due to friction in parts of the mechanism. On its return, the experiment was exhibited in the London Science Museum.

While in orbit, Jemison planned to speak from orbit on a live TV conference to Chicago grade-school students at an event hosted by NASA and the Chicago Museum of Science and Industry. The event was planned for September 16, 1992, at 7:00 p.m. central time.

The mission, scheduled to end on September 19, 1992, was extended for one more day to complete certain experiments.

== Gallery ==
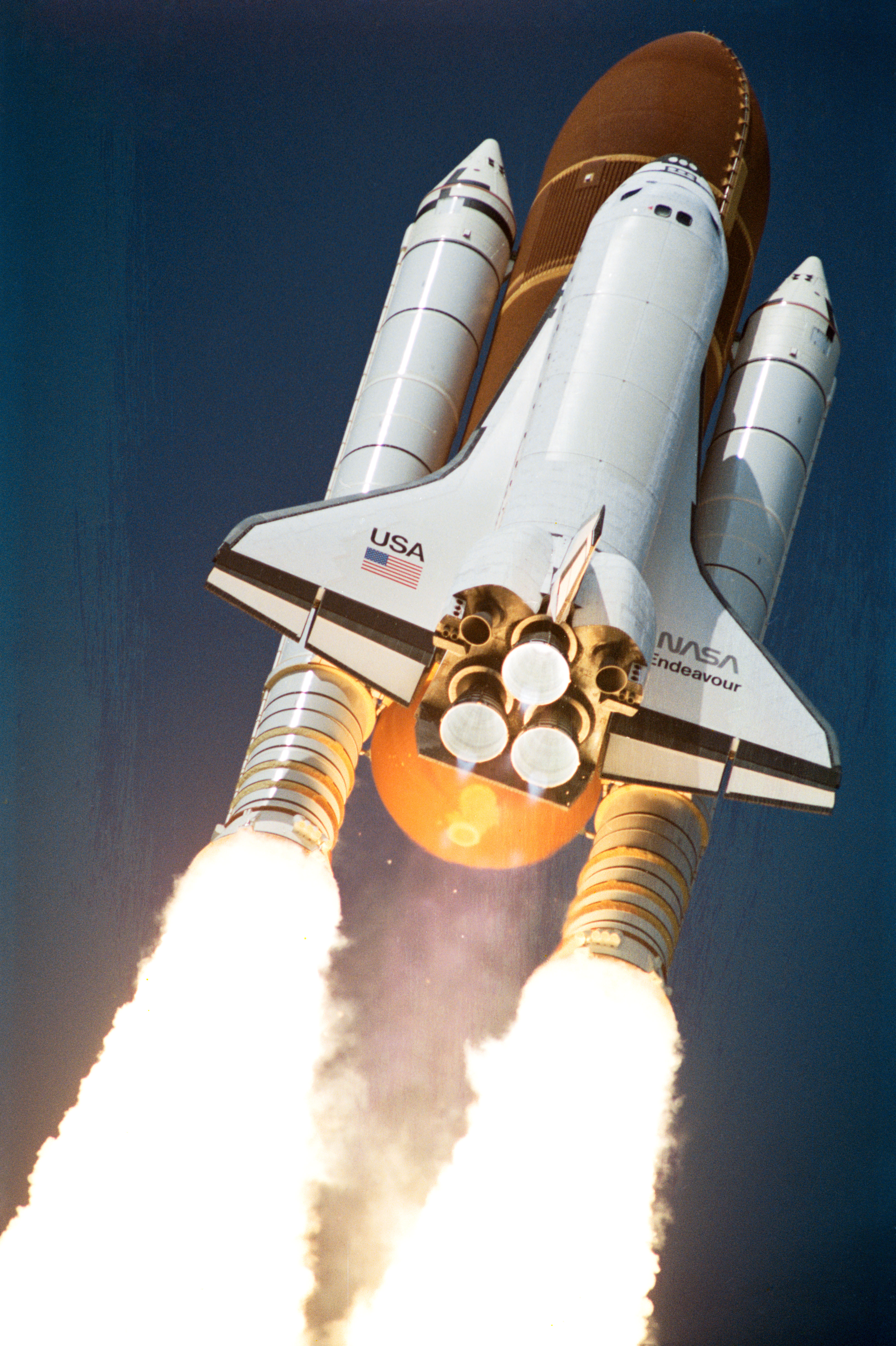
Launch of STS-47

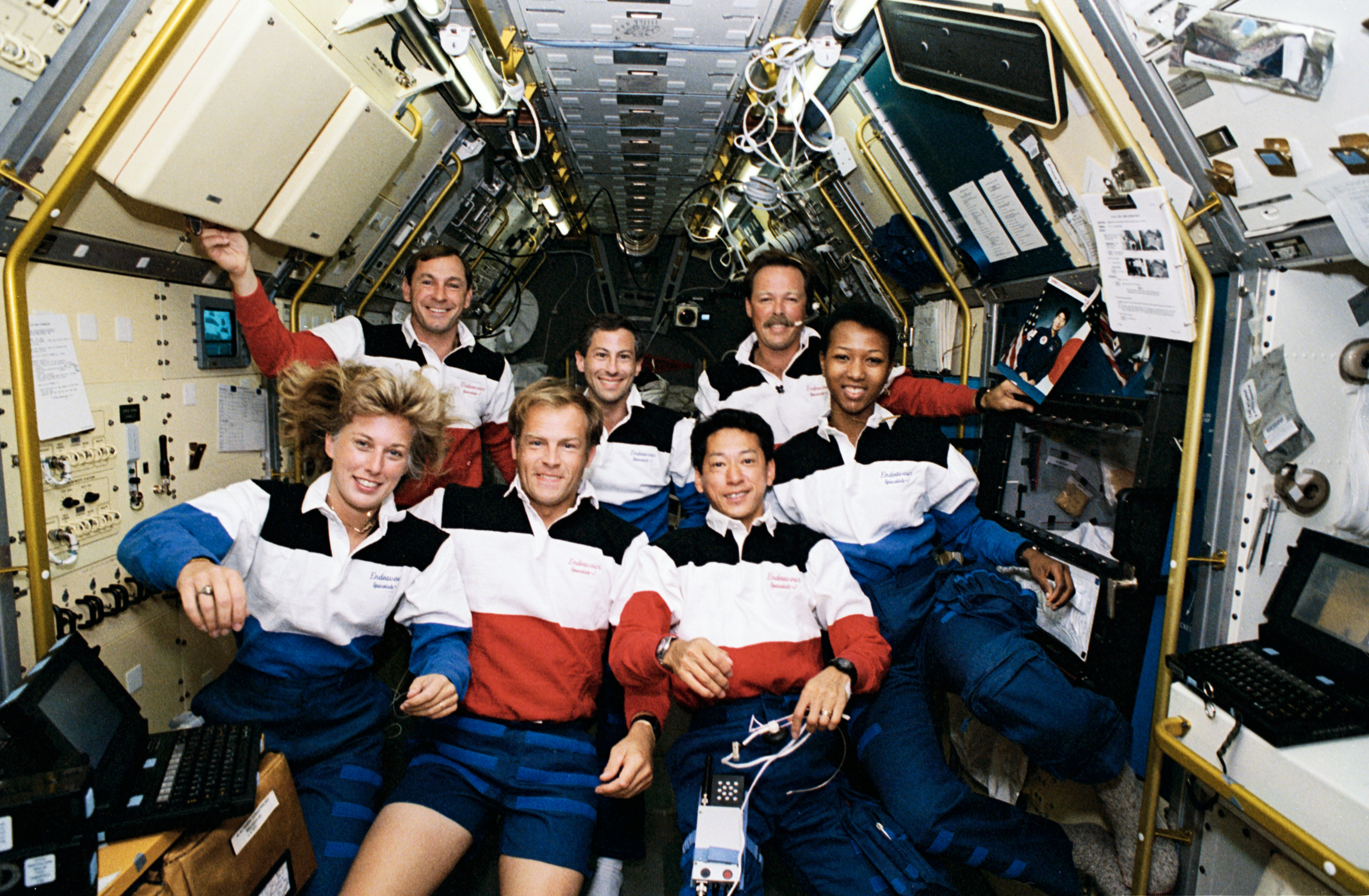
STS-47 crew pose for a portrait inside the Spacelab-J module during the mission.

Eye of Hurricane Bonnie (1992) photographed onboard Endeavour.

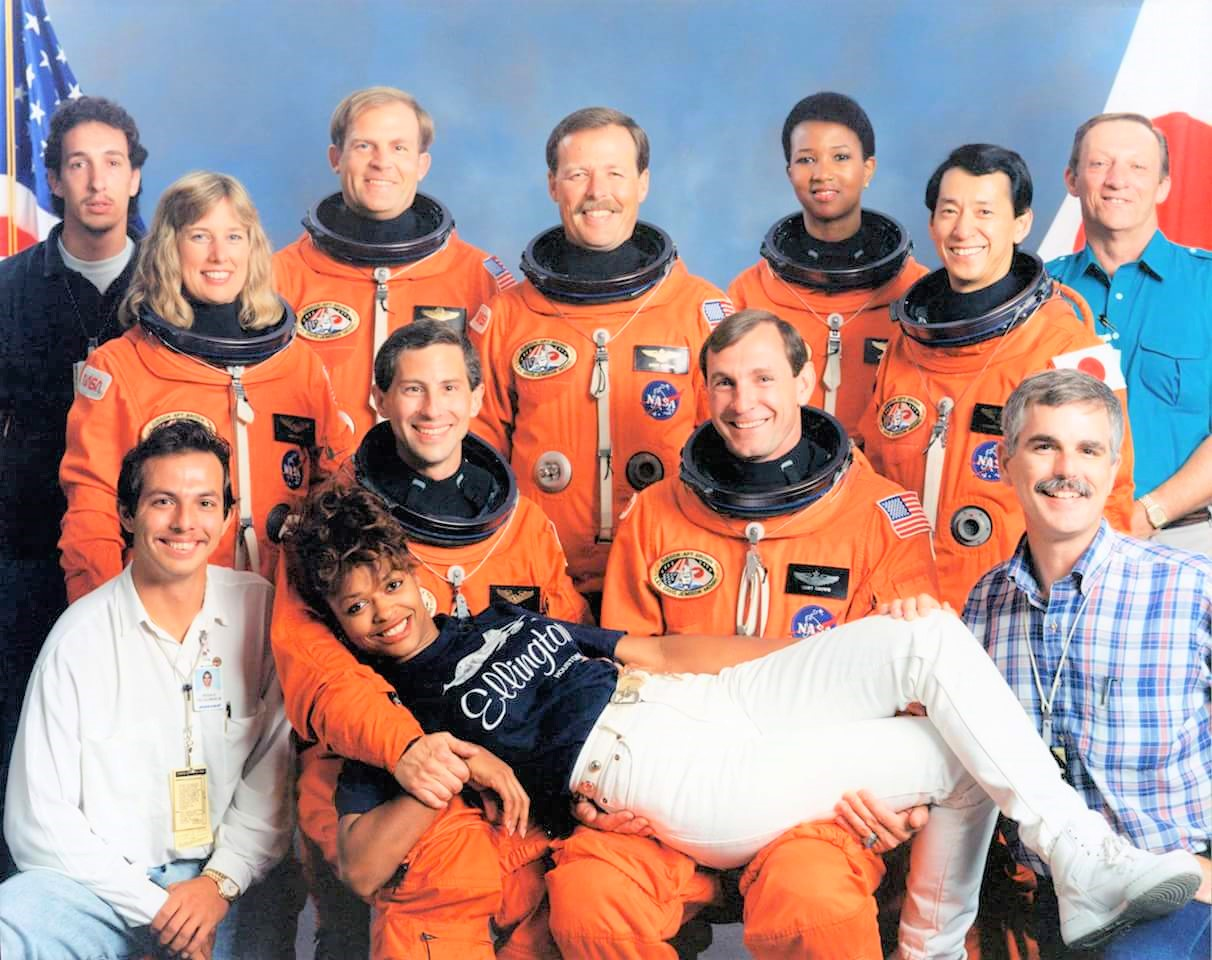
Alternate crew and support staff photo, featuring the seven crewmembers and spacesuit technician Sharon McDougle, front center, among others.

== See also ==
- List of human spaceflights
- List of Space Shuttle missions
- Nikon NASA F4
- Outline of space science
