= Mamoru Mohri =

Japanese astronaut and engineer (born 1948)

- 毛利 衛
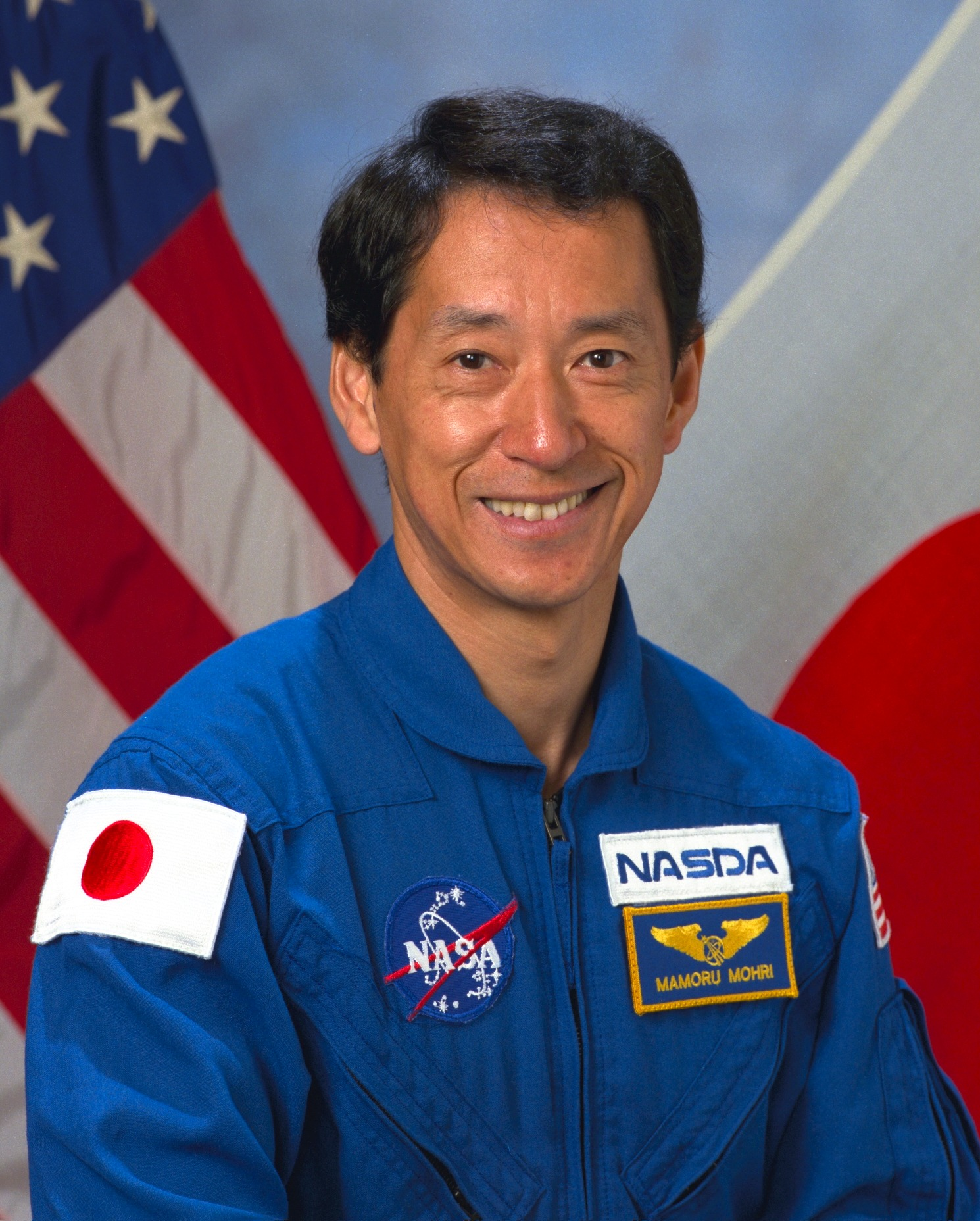
- Mohri in 2000
- Born: 29 January 1948 (age 78); Yoichi, Hokkaidō, Japan
- Occupation: Engineer
- Space career

NASDA astronaut
- Status: Retired
- Time in space: 19d 04h 09m
- Selection: 1985 NASDA Group/NASA Group 16 (1996)
- Mission: STS-47, STS-99
- Scientific career
- Fields: Materials science
- Thesis: Physical adsorption on metals. (1976)

Mamoru "Mark" Mohri, AM (Japanese: 毛利 衛, romanized: Mōri Mamoru; born 29 January 1948) is a Japanese scientist, a former NASDA astronaut, and a veteran of two NASA Space Shuttle missions. He is the first Japanese astronaut who was part of an official Japanese space program. The first Japanese person in space, Toyohiro Akiyama, was a journalist who was trained in the Soviet Union.

== Biography ==
Born in Yoichi, Hokkaidō, Japan, Mohri earned both a BSc and MSc degree in chemistry from Hokkaido University in respectively 1970 and 1972, and a PhD degree in chemistry from Flinders University in Adelaide, South Australia, in 1976.

Most of Mohri's work has been in the field of materials and vacuum sciences. From 1975 to 1985, Mohri was a member of the nuclear engineering faculty of Hokkaido University, where he worked on nuclear fusion-related projects.

== Astronaut career ==
Mohri was selected by the National Space Development Agency of Japan (now JAXA) to train as a payload specialist for a Japanese materials science payload. He flew his first space mission aboard STS-47 in 1992 as chief payload specialist for Spacelab-J. Mohri subsequently made another trip into space as part of mission STS-99 in 2000.

As of 2001, Mohri is the Chief Executive Director Emeritus for the Miraikan, the National Museum of Emerging Science and Innovation in Tokyo.

== Honours ==
On 16 March 2006 Mohri was appointed an Honorary Member of the Order of Australia (AM), “for service to Australia-Japan education and science relations.”
