= STS-64 =

1994 American crewed spaceflight

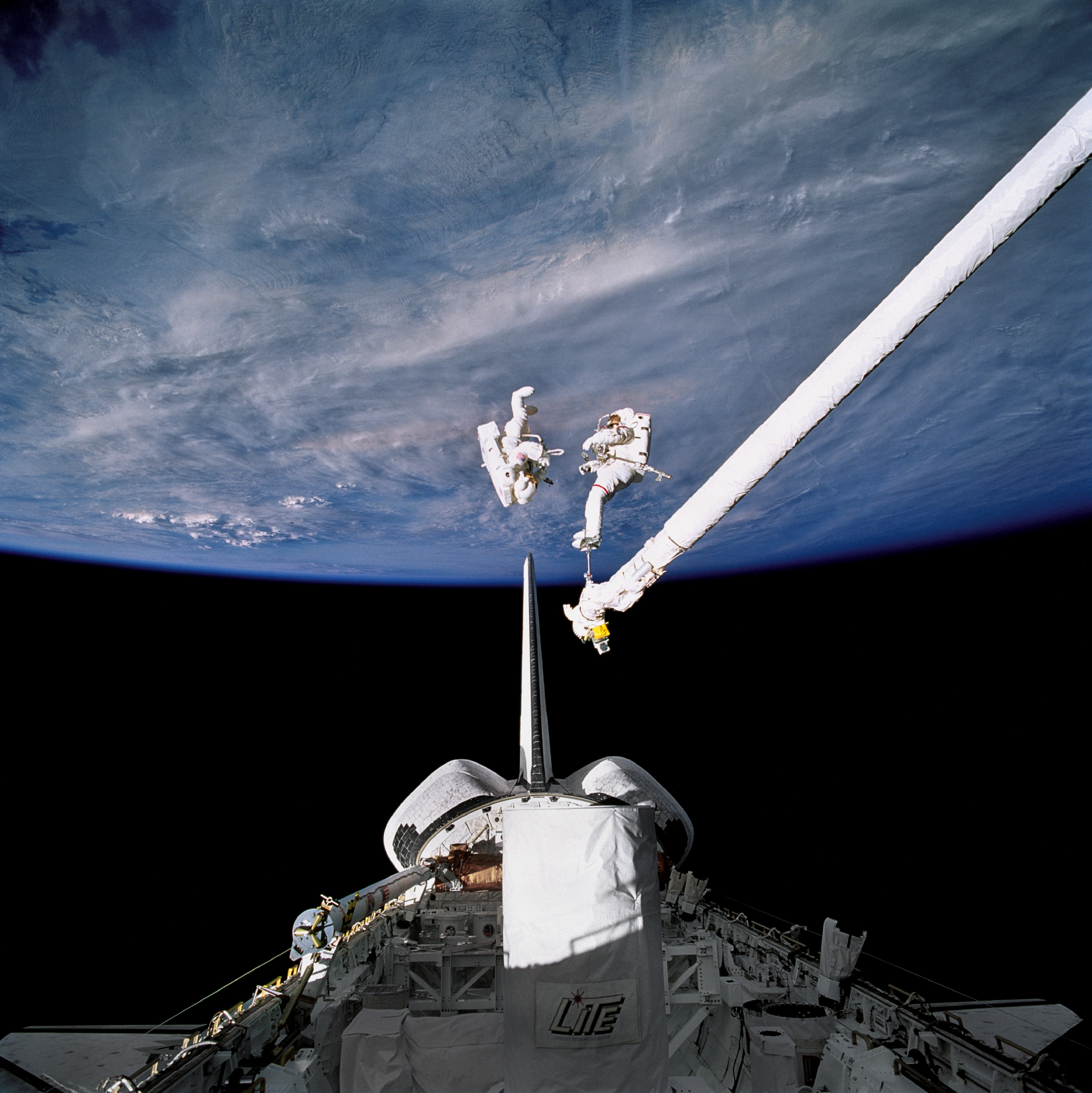
- Lee and Meade perform an untethered EVA with SAFER backpacks above Discovery's payload bay
- Names: Space Transportation System-64
- Mission type: Research; Technology
- Operator: NASA
- COSPAR ID: 1994-059A
- SATCAT no.: 23251
- Mission duration: 10 days, 22 hours, 49 minutes, 57 seconds
- Distance travelled: 7,242,048 kilometers (4,500,000 mi)
- Orbits completed: 176

Spacecraft properties
- Spacecraft: Space Shuttle Discovery
- Payload mass: 9,260 kilograms (20,410 lb)

Crew
- Crew size: 6
- Members: Richard N. Richards; L. Blaine Hammond, Jr.; Jerry M. Linenger; Susan J. Helms; Carl J. Meade; Mark Charles Lee

Start of mission
- Launch date: 9 September 1994, 22:22:35 UTC
- Launch site: Kennedy, LC-39B

End of mission
- Landing date: 20 September 1994, 21:12:52 UTC
- Landing site: Edwards, Runway 4

Orbital parameters
- Reference system: Geocentric
- Regime: Low Earth
- Perigee altitude: 259 kilometres (161 mi)
- Apogee altitude: 269 kilometres (167 mi)
- Inclination: 56.9 degrees
- Period: 89.5 min
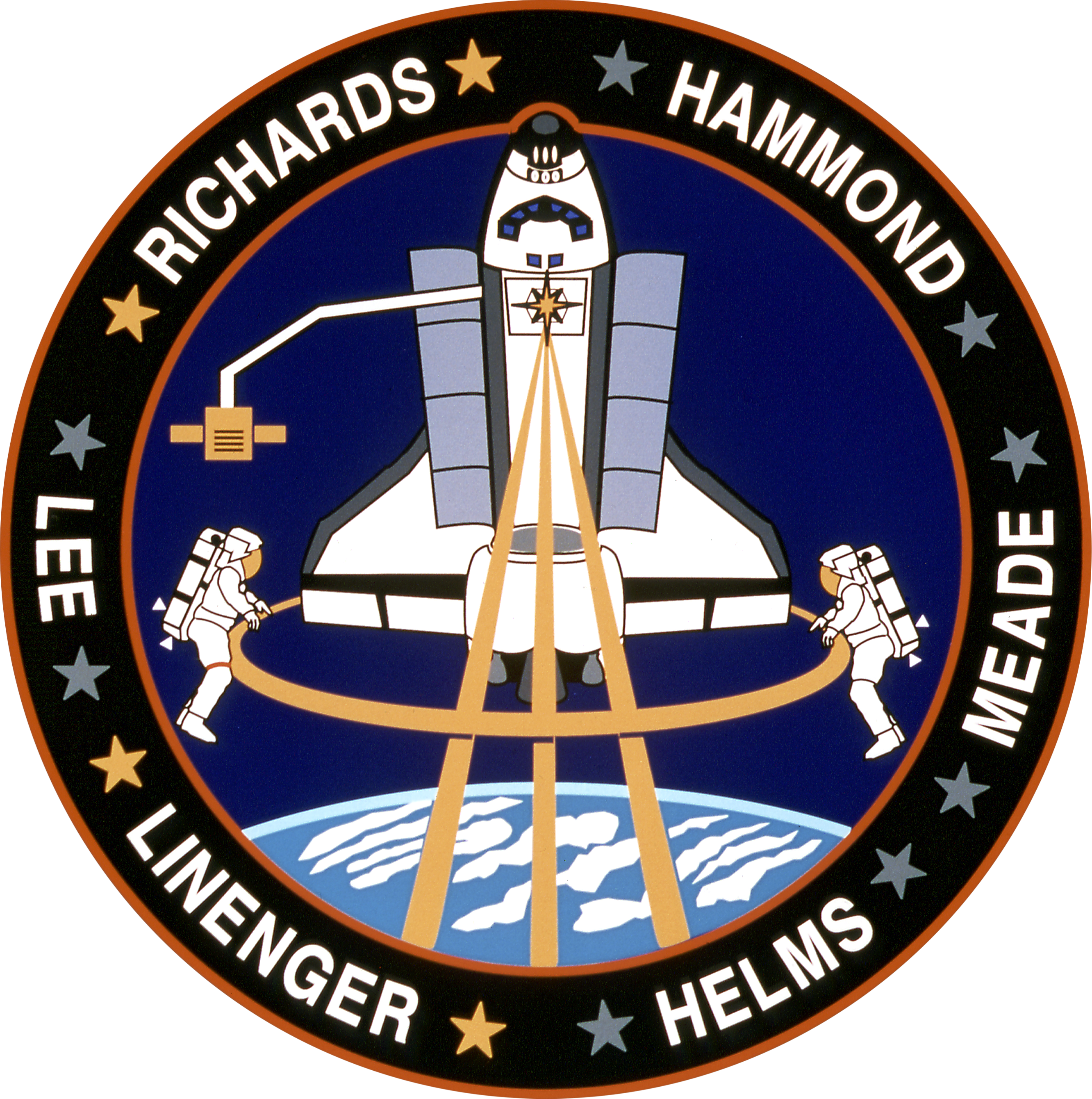
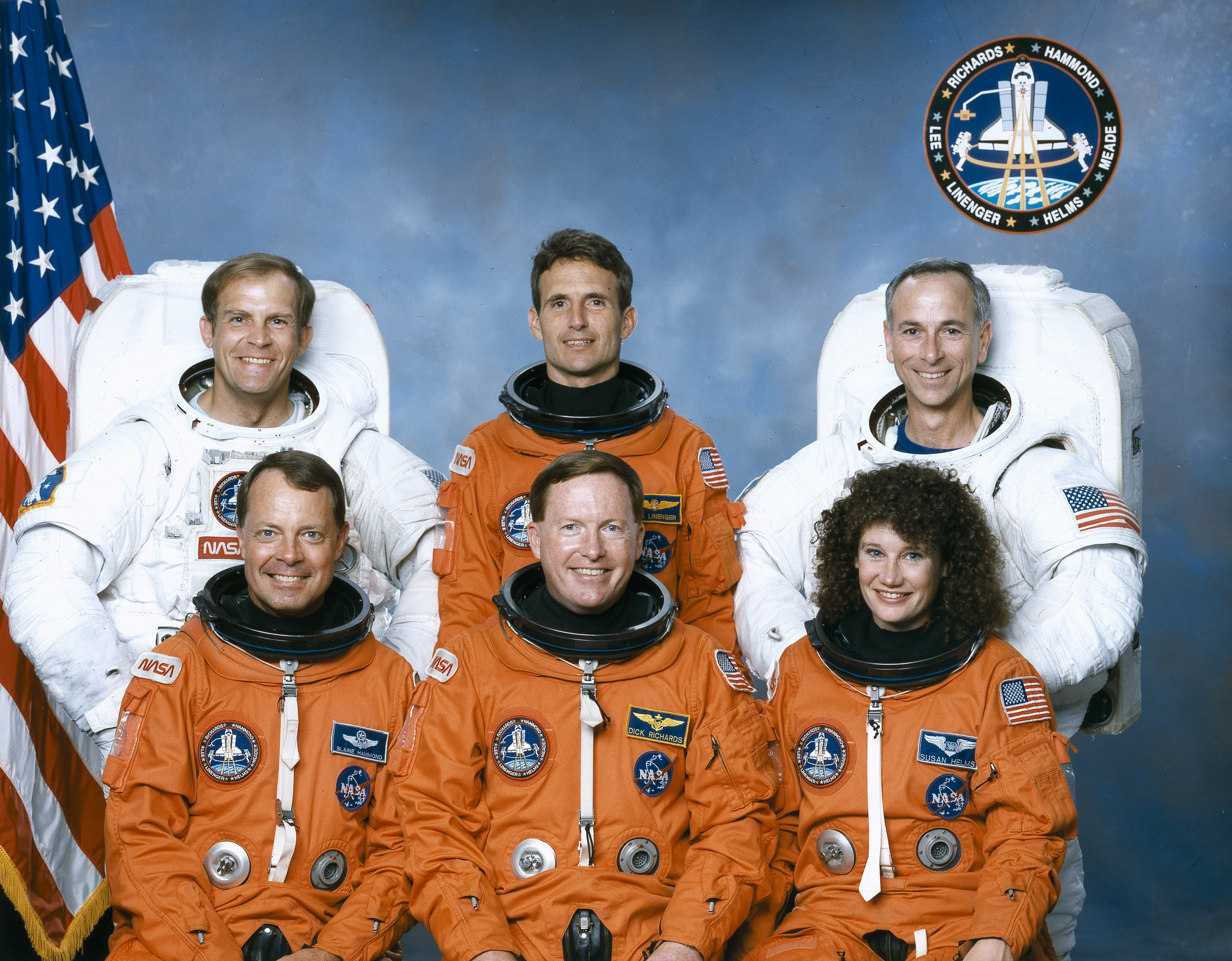
- Left to right – Front: Hammond, Richards, Helms; Back: Lee, Linenger, Meade Space Shuttle program

STS-64 was a Space Shuttle Discovery mission that was set to perform multiple experiment packages. It was Discovery's 19th flight. STS-64 was launched from Kennedy Space Center, Florida, on 9 September 1994, and landed back on 20 September 1994 at Edwards Air Force Base.

== Crew ==
| Position | Astronaut |
|---|---|
| Commander | Richard N. Richards; Fourth and last spaceflight |
| Pilot | L. Blaine Hammond, Jr. Second and last spaceflight |
| Mission Specialist 1 | Jerry M. Linenger; First spaceflight |
| Mission Specialist 2 Flight Engineer | Susan J. Helms; Second spaceflight |
| Mission Specialist 3 | Carl J. Meade; Third and last spaceflight |
| Mission Specialist 4 | Mark C. Lee; Third spaceflight |

=== Spacewalks ===
- Lee and Meade – EVA 1
- EVA 1 Start: 16 September 1994 – 14:42 UTC
- EVA 1 End: 16 September 1994 – 21:33 UTC
- Duration: 6 hours, 51 minutes

=== Crew seat assignments ===
| Seat | Launch | Landing | Seats 1–4 are on the flight deck. Seats 5–7 are on the mid-deck. |
| 1 | Richards | | Seats 1–4 are on the flight deck. Seats 5–7 are on the mid-deck. |
| 2 | Hammond | | Seats 1–4 are on the flight deck. Seats 5–7 are on the mid-deck. |
| 3 | Lieneger | Meade | Seats 1–4 are on the flight deck. Seats 5–7 are on the mid-deck. |
| 4 | Helms | | Seats 1–4 are on the flight deck. Seats 5–7 are on the mid-deck. |
| 5 | Meade | Linenger | Seats 1–4 are on the flight deck. Seats 5–7 are on the mid-deck. |
| 6 | Lee | | Seats 1–4 are on the flight deck. Seats 5–7 are on the mid-deck. |
| 7 | Unused | | Seats 1–4 are on the flight deck. Seats 5–7 are on the mid-deck. |

== Mission highlights ==
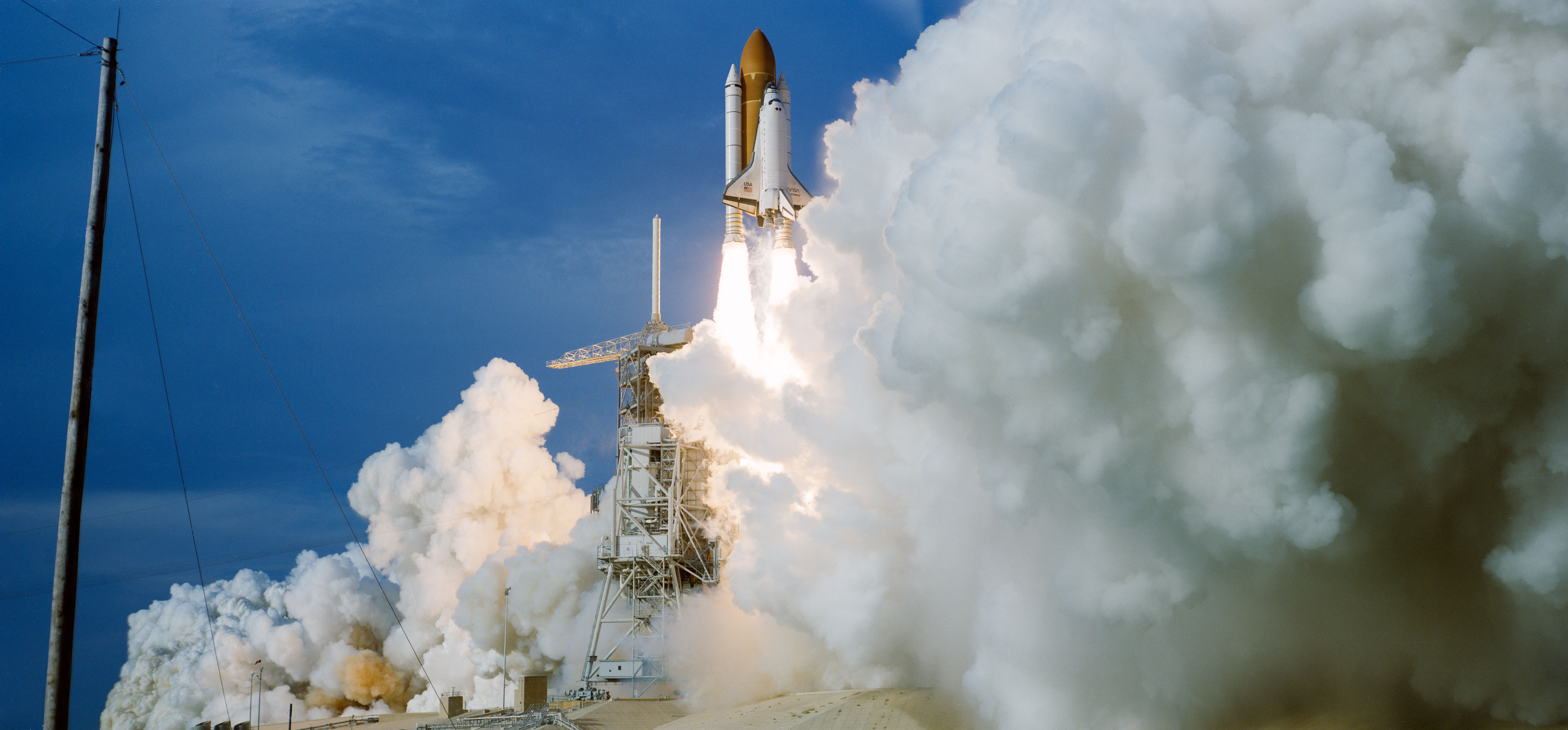
STS-64 launches from Kennedy Space Center, 9 September 1994.

STS-64 marked the first flight of Lidar In-space Technology Experiment (LITE) and the first untethered U.S. extravehicular activity (EVA) in 10 years. LITE payload employs lidar, which stands for light detection and ranging, a type of optical radar using laser pulses instead of radio waves to study Earth's atmosphere. The first spaceflight of lidar was a highly successful technology test. The LITE instrument operated for 53 hours, yielding more than 43 hours of high-rate data. Unprecedented views were obtained of cloud structures, storm systems, dust clouds, pollutants, forest burning and surface reflectance. Sites studied included atmosphere above northern Europe, Indonesia and the south Pacific, Russia and Africa. Sixty-five groups from 20 countries made validation measurements with ground-based and aircraft instruments to verify LITE data. The LITE science program was part of NASA's Mission to Planet Earth.

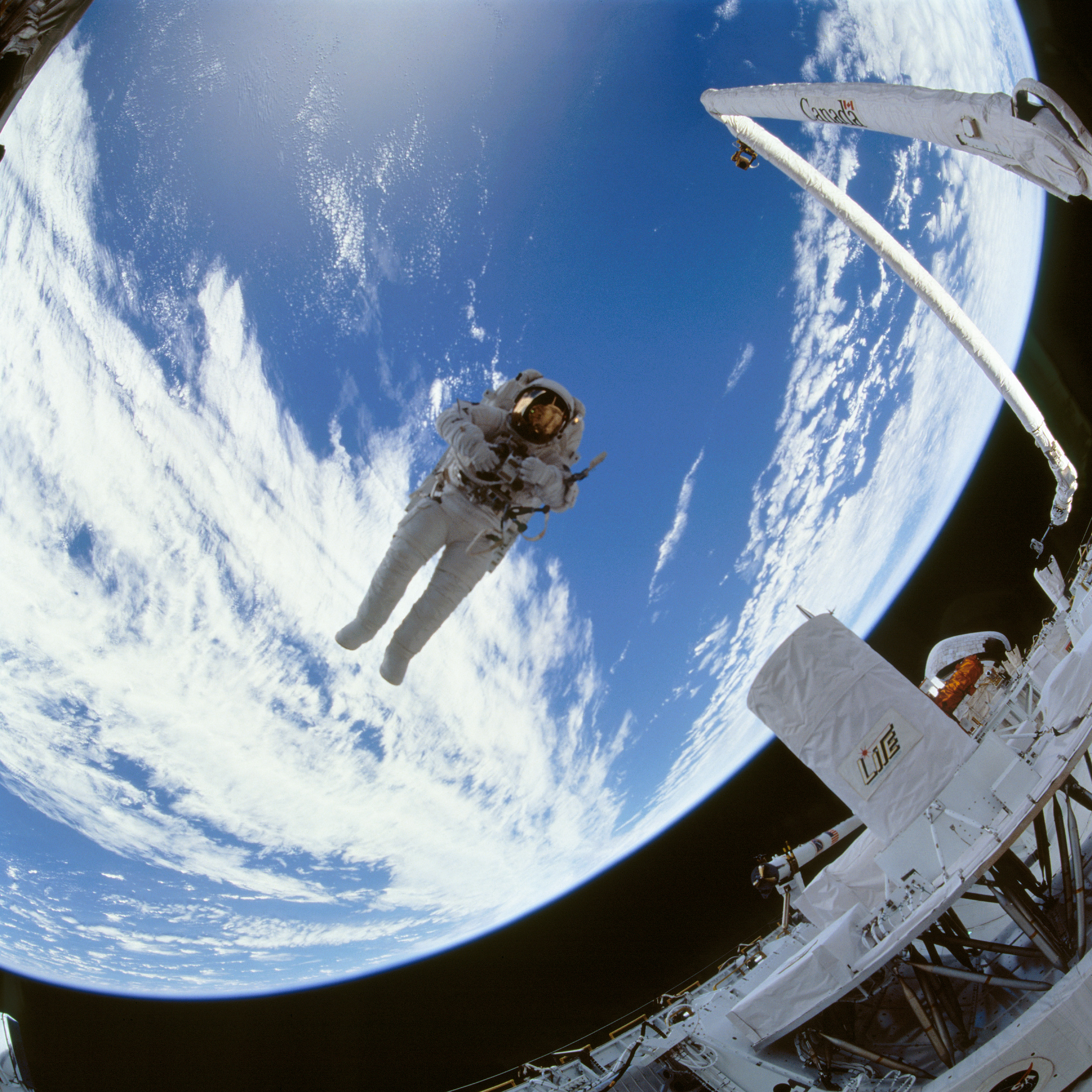
Carl Meade drifts over the payload bay.

Mission Specialists Lee and Meade completed the 28th EVA of the Space Shuttle program on 16 Sept. During the six-hour, 15-minute EVA, they tested a new backpack called Simplified Aid for EVA Rescue (SAFER), designed for use in event crew member becomes untethered while conducting an EVA. Operations with SAFER marked the first untethered EVA since STS 51-A in 1984, and also the last such EVA of the program. SAFER went on to become a mainstay of US and joint spacewalks during the assembly of the International Space Station and beyond.

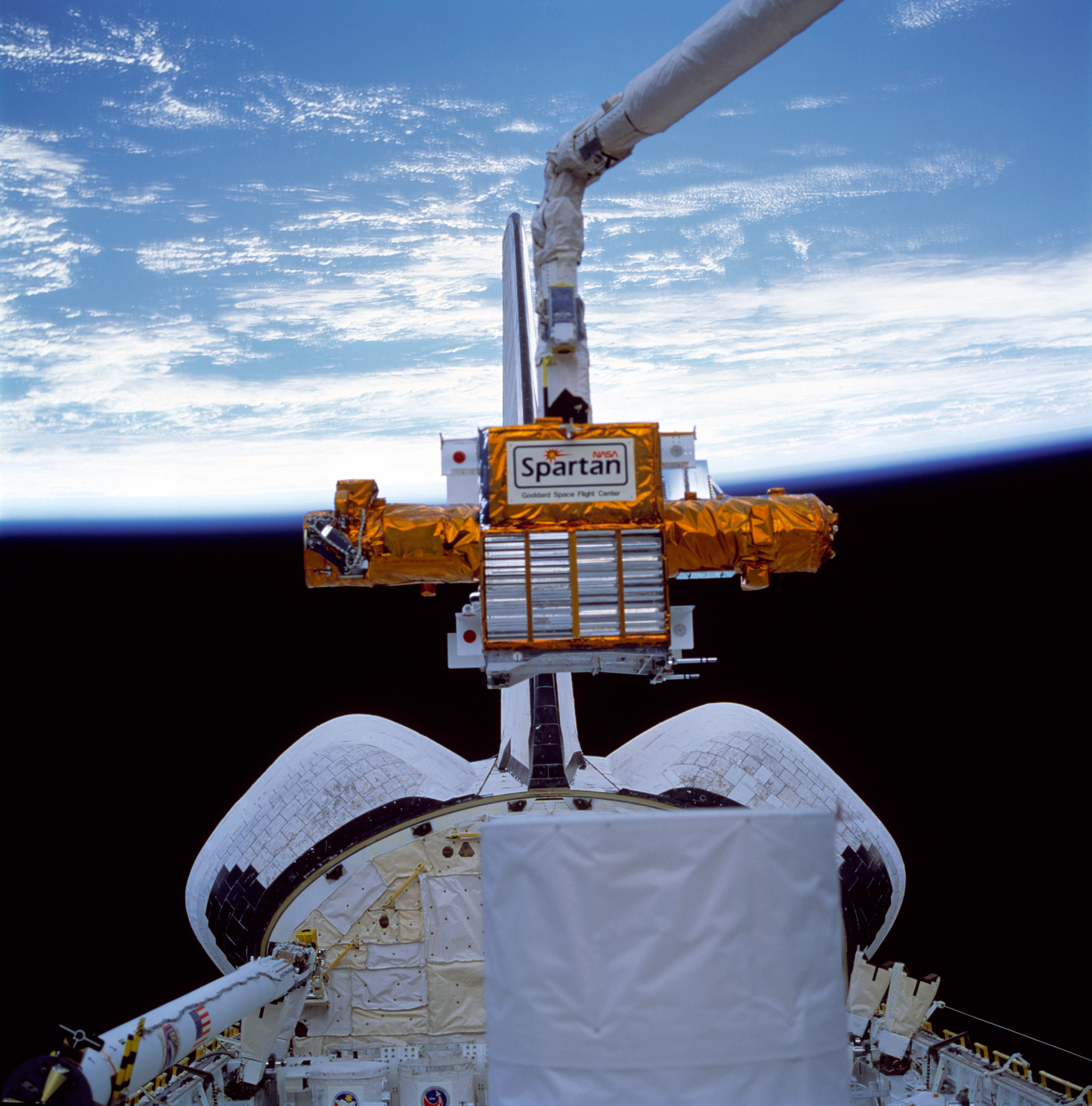
SPARTAN on the arm.

On the fifth day of the mission, the Shuttle Pointed Autonomous Research Tool for Astronomy-201 (SPARTAN-201) free flyer was released using the Remote Manipulator System arm. Making its second flight on the Shuttle, SPARTAN-201 was designed to collect data about the acceleration and velocity of the solar wind and to measure aspects of the Sun's corona. Data was recorded for playback after return to Earth. SPARTAN-201 was retrieved after two days of data collection.

Other cargo bay payloads: Shuttle Plume Impingement Flight Experiment (SPIFEX), a 33-foot (10-meter) long instrumented extension for Shuttle robot arm. SPIFEX designed to collect data about orbiter Reaction Control System (RCS) thrusters to aid understanding about potential effects of thruster plumes on large space structures, such as Mir space station or the planned international space station. The Robot Operated Processing System (ROMPS) was the first U.S. robotics system operated in space, mounted in two Get Away Special (GAS) canisters attached to the cargo bay wall. A GAS bridge assembly in the cargo bay carried 12 cans, 10 holding self-contained experiments.

Middeck experiments included: Biological Research in Canister (BRIC) experiment to investigate effects of spaceflight on plant specimens; Military Application of Ship Tracks (MAST) to take high-resolution imagery of ship tracks and to analyze wake formation and dissipations; Solid Surface Combustion Experiment (SSCE) to supply information on flame propagation over fuels in space; Radiation Monitoring Equipment III (RME III) to measure ionizing radiation; Shuttle Amateur Radio Experiment II (SAREX II) to demonstrate feasibility of short-wave radio contacts between orbiter and ground-based amateur radio operators; and Air Force Maui Optical Station (AMOS) test, which required no onboard hardware.

STS-64 was the first mission to see the use of the new full-pressure Advanced Crew Escape Suit, which eventually replaced the partial-pressure Launch Entry Suit.

== See also ==
- List of human spaceflights
- List of Space Shuttle missions
- Outline of space science
- Space Shuttle
