= Mark C. Lee =

American astronaut (born 1952)

Mark Lee
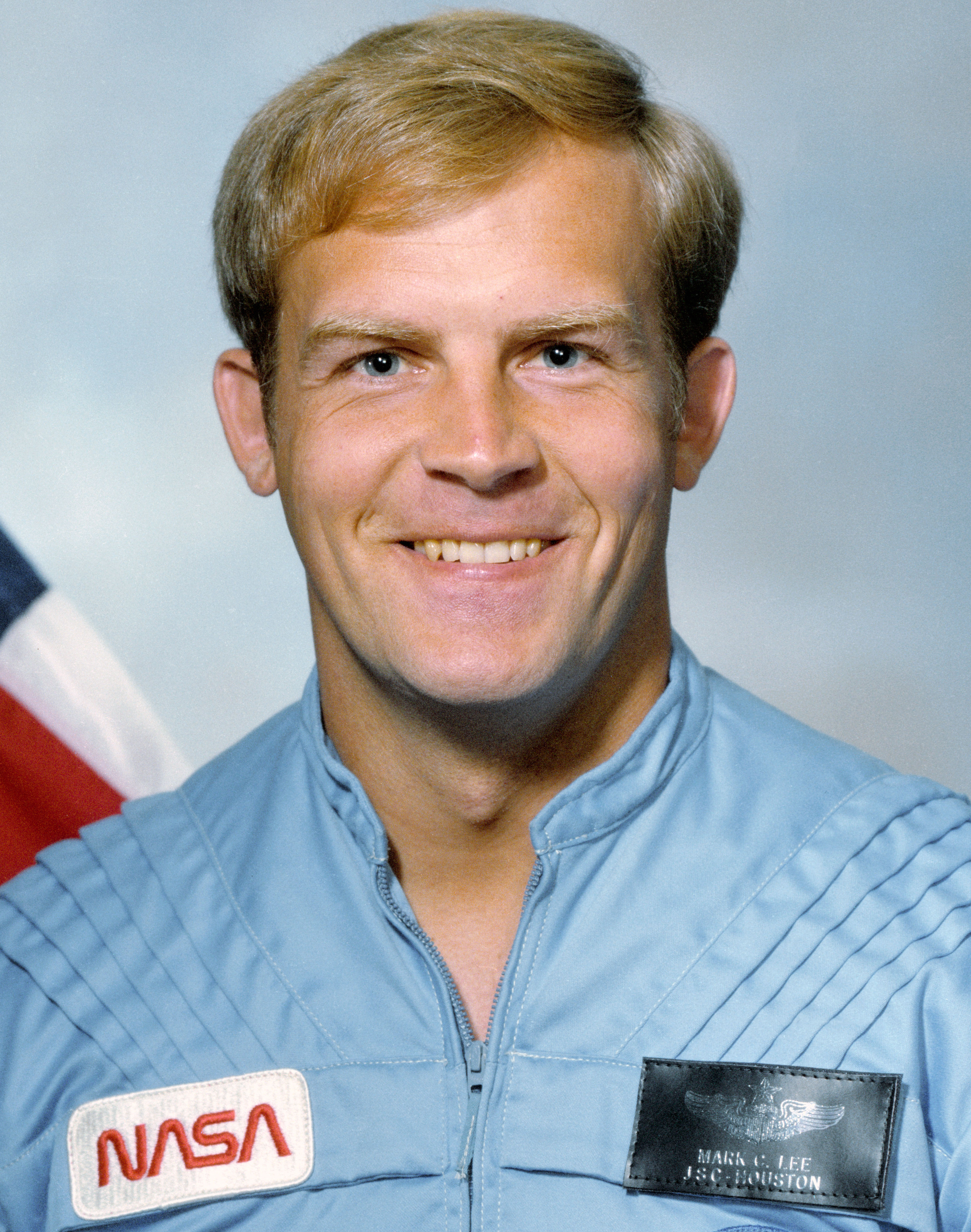
- Lee in 1984
- Born: Mark Charles Lee; August 14, 1952 (age 74); Viroqua, Wisconsin, U.S.
- Education: United States Air Force Academy (BS); Massachusetts Institute of Technology (MS)
- Spouse: Jan Davis (m. 1991; div. 1999)
- Space career

NASA astronaut
- Rank: Colonel, USAF
- Time in space: 32d 21h 46m
- Selection: NASA Group 10 (1984)
- Total EVAs: 4
- Total EVA time: 26h, 01m
- Mission: STS-30; STS-47; STS-64; STS-82
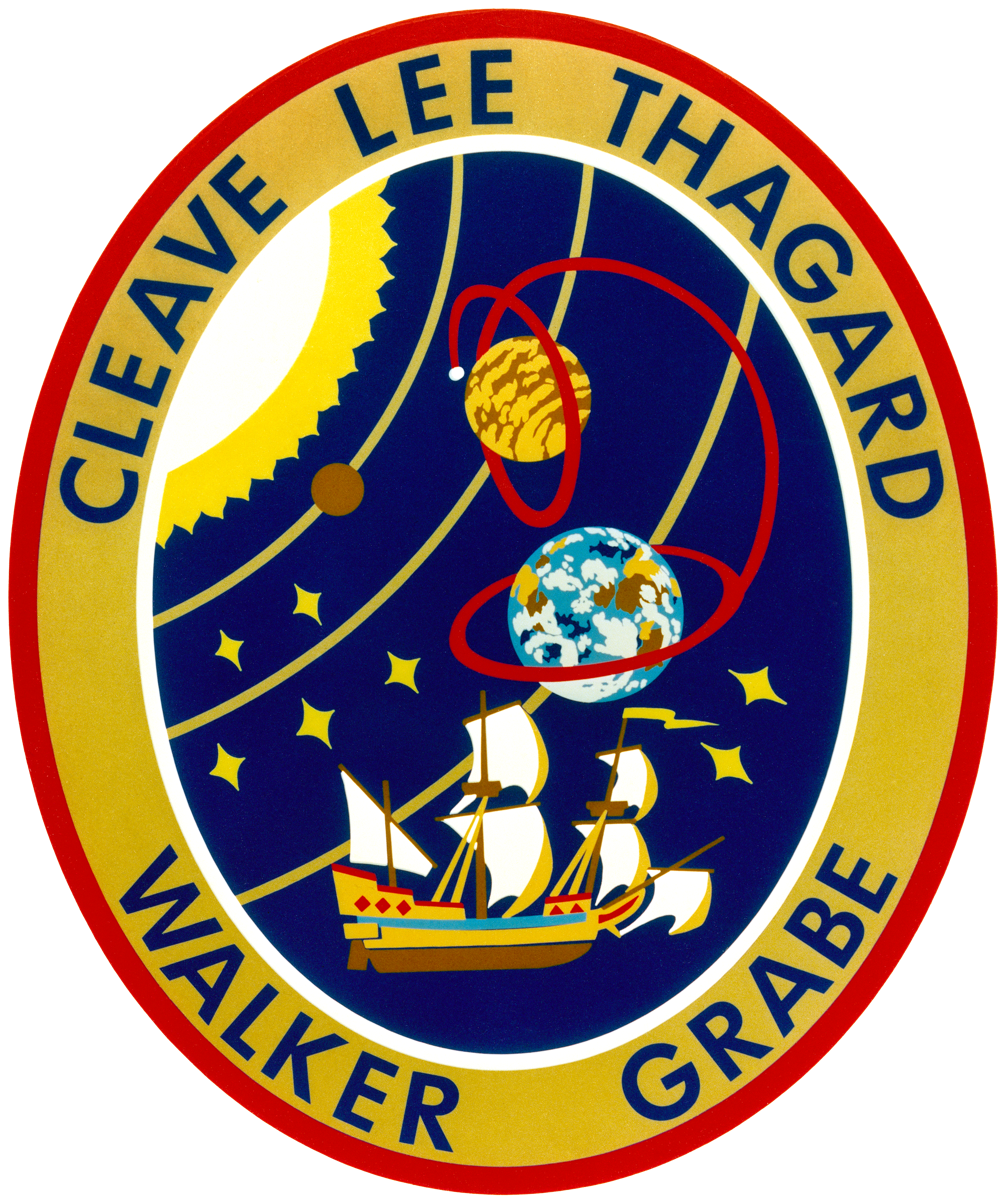
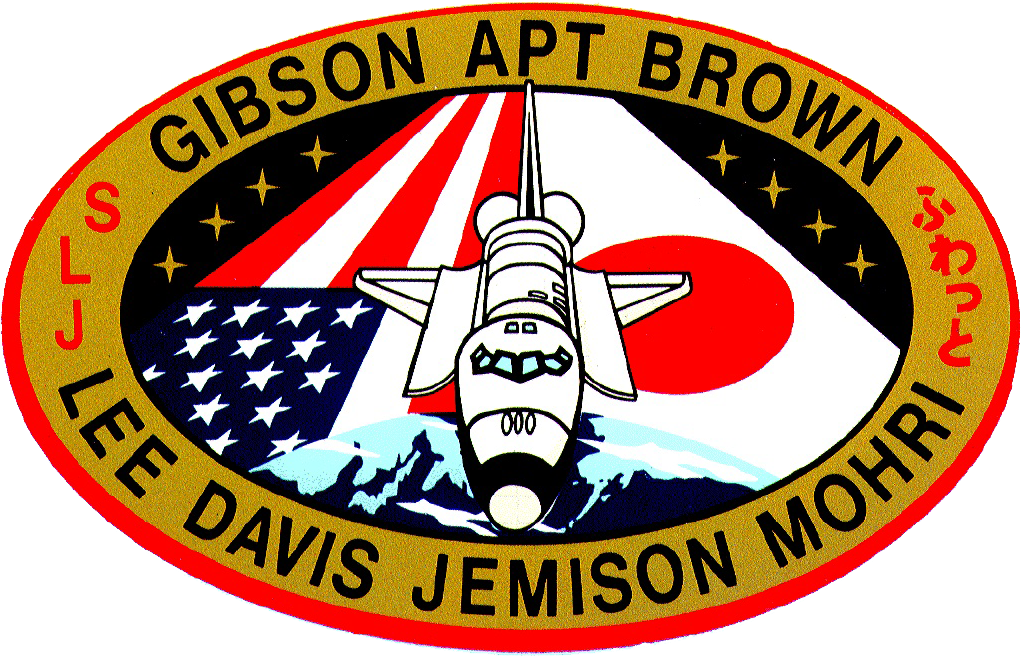
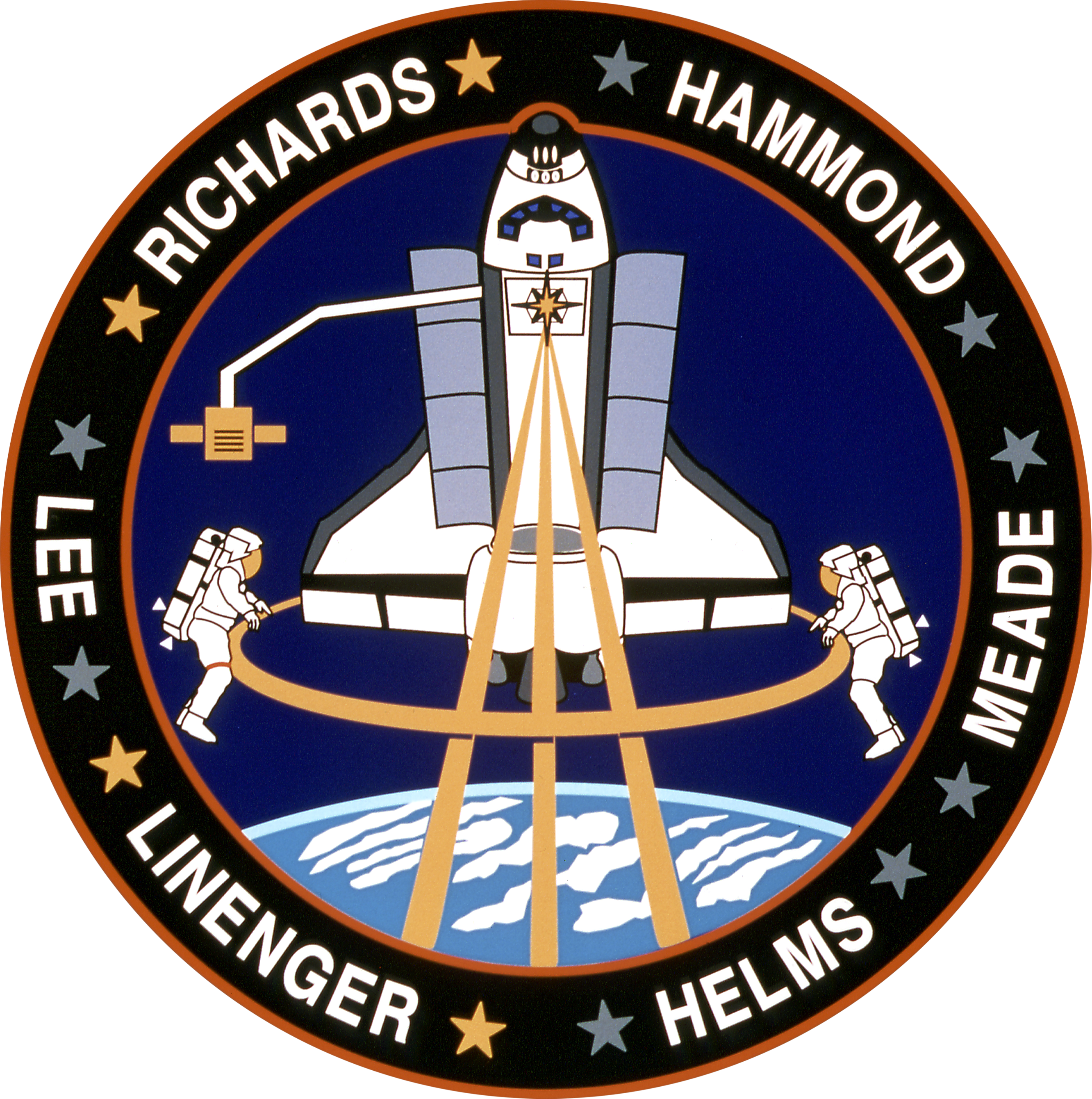
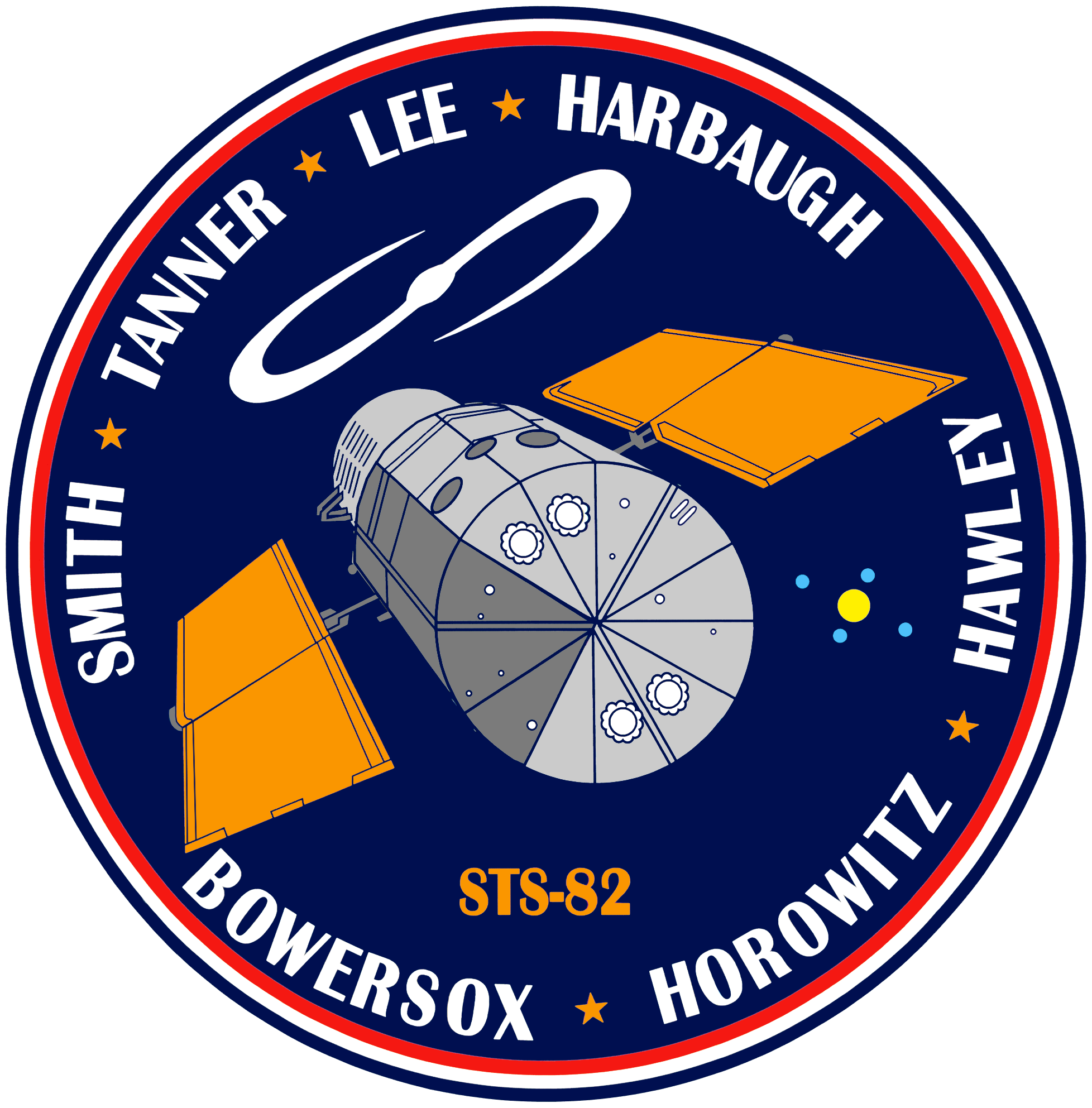
- Mission insignia

Mark Charles Lee USAF Colonel, (born August 14, 1952) is a former NASA astronaut who flew on four Space Shuttle missions. He retired from the Air Force and NASA on July 1, 2001.

== Early life ==
Lee was born August 14, 1952, in Viroqua, Wisconsin, and graduated from Viroqua High School in 1970. Lee is an Eagle Scout. He later attended the United States Air Force Academy, where he received a Bachelor of Science degree in civil engineering in 1974. Following pilot training at Laughlin Air Force Base, Texas, and F-4 Phantom II upgrade at Luke Air Force Base, Arizona, Lee spent 2 1/2 years at Kadena Air Base in Okinawa, Japan, flying F-4's in the 25th Tactical Fighter Squadron. In 1979, after this assignment, he studied for a Master of Science degree in mechanical engineering at the Massachusetts Institute of Technology, where he specialized in graphite/epoxy advanced composite materials.

After graduation from MIT in 1980, he was assigned to Hanscom Air Force Base, Massachusetts, in the Airborne Warning and Control System (AWACS) Program Office, as the operational support manager. His responsibilities included resolving mechanical and material deficiencies which affected the mission readiness of the AWACS aircraft. In 1982 he returned to flying, upgrading in the F-16 and serving as executive officer for the 388th Tactical Fighter Wing Deputy Commander for Operations, and as flight commander in the 4th Tactical Fighter Squadron at Hill Air Force Base, Utah, until his selection as an astronaut candidate.

== Astronaut career ==
Lee was selected as an astronaut candidate by NASA in May 1984. In June 1985, he completed a one-year training and evaluation program, qualifying him for assignment as a mission specialist on future Space Shuttle flight crews. His technical responsibilities within the Astronaut Office included extravehicular activity (EVA), the Inertial Upper Stage, Spacelab, and Space Station systems. Lee also served as a spacecraft communicator in the Mission Control Center, as Lead Astronaut Support Person at the Kennedy Space Center, Chief of Astronaut Appearances, Chief of the Astronaut Office Mission Development Branch, Chief of the EVA Robotics Branch, and Chief of the EVA Branch. He also worked Space Station assembly issues for the Astronaut Office.

In total, during his four space flights, Lee traveled over 13 million miles going around the world 517 times and spending 33 days in orbit, he also completed 4 spacewalks (EVA), 1 on STS-64 and 3 on STS-82. Lee's first shuttle mission was as a mission specialist on STS-30 (May 4–8, 1989). This mission involved the launch of the Magellan probe, a Venus-exploration spacecraft and experiments involving life sciences and crystals.

In his second flight, mission STS-47, running from September 12–20, 1992, Lee was payload commander with overall crew responsibility for the planning, integration, and on-orbit coordination of payload/Space Shuttle activities. This cooperative mission between the United States and Japan included 44 Japanese and U.S. life science and materials processing experiments and the shuttle carried Spacelab-J. Lee also initiated a unique distinction with STS-47: his wife at that time, Jan Davis, was a mission specialist on the flight, making Lee and Davis the first married couple to be in space at the same time. Lee and Davis had met during training for the flight and had married in secret. They disclosed their marriage to NASA shortly before the flight, when it was too late to train a substitute. NASA has since changed the rules and will not allow married astronauts on the same flight.

Lee was a mission specialist on his third flight, mission STS-64, running from September 9–20, 1994. During this flight, he logged 6 hours and 51 minutes of EVA to test a self-rescue jetpack, undertook the first untethered spacewalk in 10 years and deployed and retrieved a solar science satellite. Lee's final flight was STS-82, running from February 11–21, 1997. This was the second Hubble Space Telescope maintenance mission and Lee again served as payload commander. He was a member of one of two spacewalk teams who installed two new spectrometers and eight replacement instruments, as well as replacing insulation patches over three compartments containing key data processing, electronics and scientific instrument telemetry packages. Lee's contribution amounted to three spacewalks totaling 19 hours and 10 minutes of EVA.

Lee was scheduled to fly another mission to the International Space Station in 2000, but was replaced by Robert Curbeam for "undisclosed reasons" which news reports claimed related to a falling-out with "at least one of his superiors at the NASA's Johnson Space Center". Lee asked for the decision to be reconsidered, but was not reinstated. He retired from NASA in 2001.

== Personal life ==
Lee married fellow astronaut Jan Davis in January 1991. They were the first married couple to fly together in space, joined in 2022 by Sharon and Marc Hagle on Blue Origin's NS-20. They divorced in 1999.

He subsequently married former Paula Marie Simon. They have three boys. In early 2006 Lee's family reunited with his birth grandmother, 77 years after his mother had been placed for adoption.

== Medals and honors ==
Lee has been awarded a number of medals and honors including the Distinguished Flying Cross, the Defense Superior Service Medal, the Legion of Merit, the Defense Meritorious Service Medal, and the Air Force Meritorious Service Medal. He has also received two Air Force Commendation Medals, four NASA Space Flight Medals, the NASA Distinguished Service Medal, the NASA Outstanding Leadership Medal, the NASA Public Service Group Achievement Award, and two NASA Exceptional Service Medals.
