= L. Blaine Hammond =

American test pilot and astronaut (born 1952)

Blaine Hammond
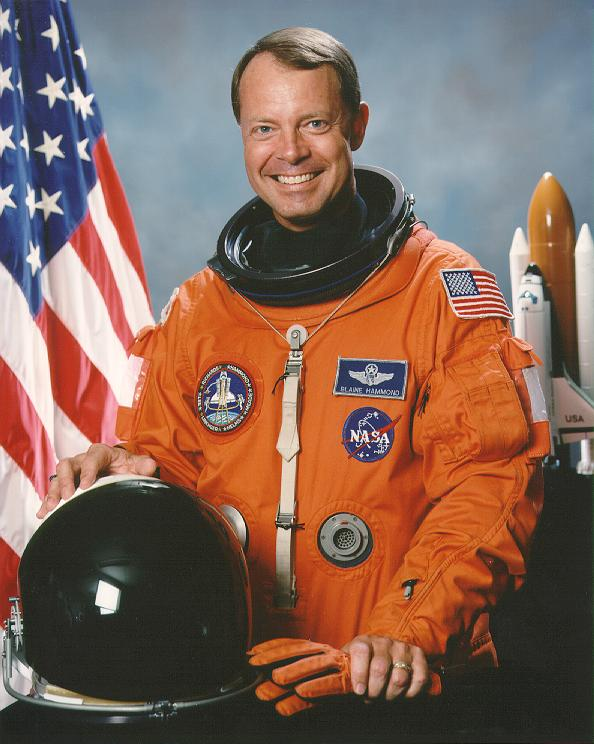
- Born: Lloyd Blaine Hammond Jr. January 16, 1952 (age 74); Savannah, Georgia, U.S.
- Education: United States Air Force Academy (BS); Georgia Institute of Technology (MS)
- Space career

NASA astronaut
- Rank: Colonel, USAF
- Time in space: 19d 6h 11m
- Selection: NASA Group 10 (1984)
- Missions: STS-39; STS-64
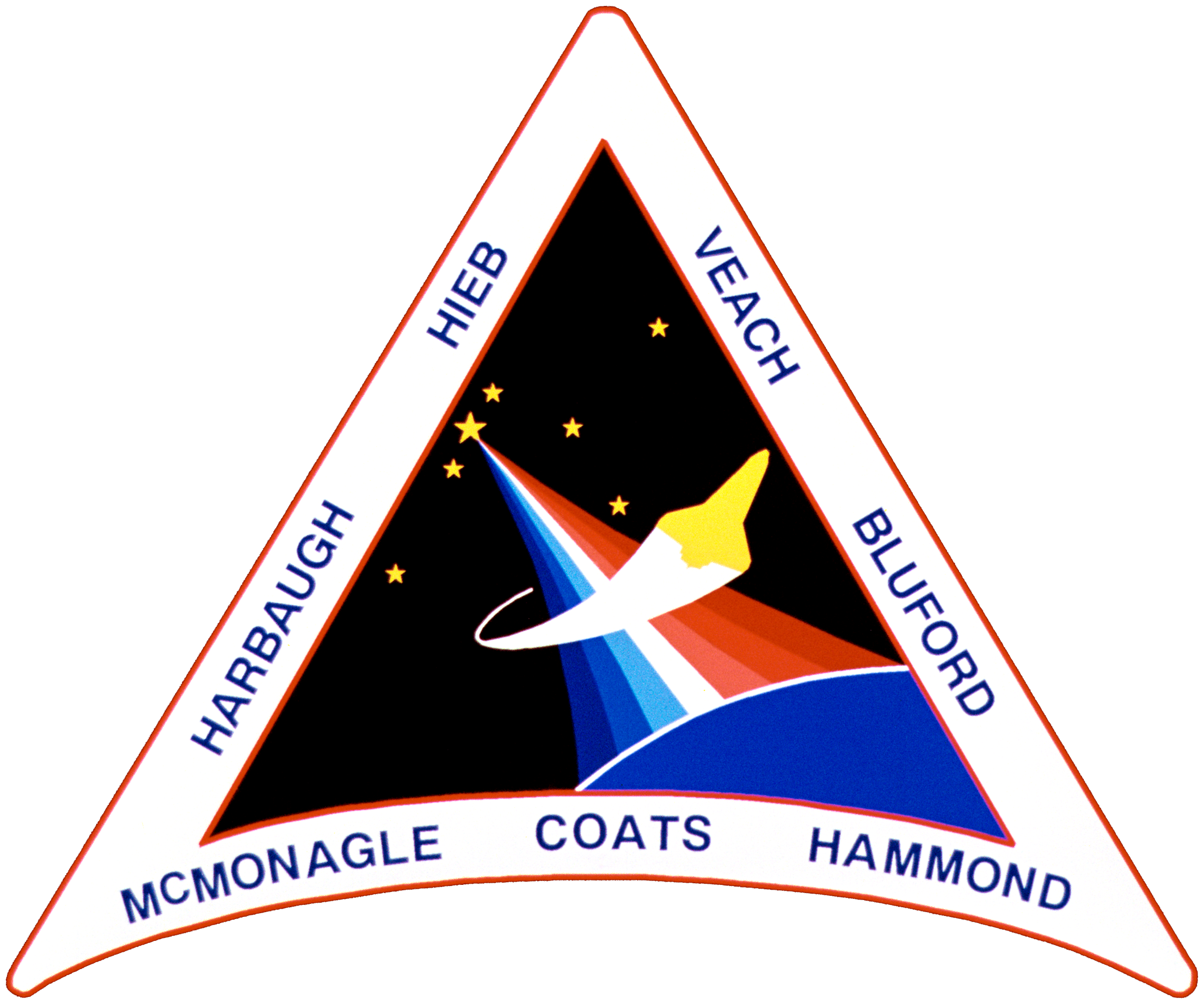
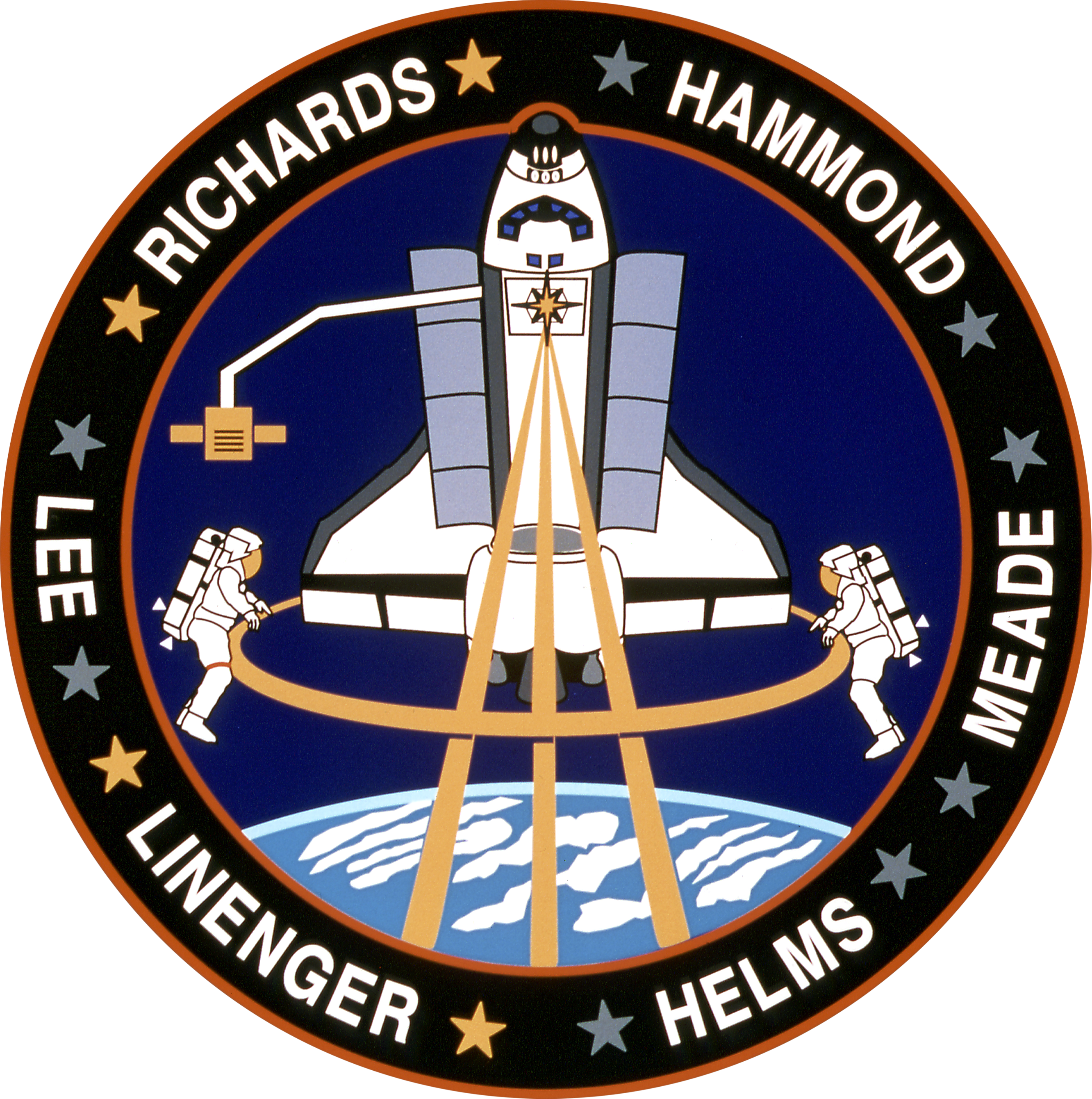
- Mission insignia

Lloyd Blaine Hammond Jr. (born January 16, 1952) is a Gulfstream test pilot, a former United States Air Force officer, and a former NASA astronaut. He flew on two Space Shuttle missions.

== Education ==
Hammond was born on January 16, 1952, in Savannah, Georgia, but considers St. Louis, Missouri his hometown. He graduated from Kirkwood High School in 1969 and received a Bachelor of Science degree in engineering, science, and mechanics from the United States Air Force Academy in 1973 and a Master of Science degree in engineering science and mechanics from Georgia Institute of Technology in 1974. He is a member of the Air Force Academy Association of Graduates, the Air Force Association, and the Order of Daedalians.

== Awards and honors ==
- Distinguished Graduate, USAF Academy
- Commander's Trophy
- Flying Training Award in Undergraduate Pilot Training
- Defense Superior Service Medal
- NASA Space Flight Medal (2)
- Air Force Commendation Medal (2)
- Gulstream Long Beach, Ca. Upstairs North West Conference Room named in his honor

== Military career ==
Hammond received his pilot wings at Reese Air Force Base, Texas, in 1975. He was assigned to the 50th Tactical Fighter Wing 496th Tactical Fighter Squadron, Hahn Air Base, Germany, flying the F4E from 1976 to 1979. In 1979–1980, he was an Instructor Pilot in the F-5B/E/F at Williams Air Force Base, Arizona, training foreign national students. He attended the Empire Test Pilots' School (ETPS) at Aeroplane and Armament Experimental Establishment (A&AEE) Boscombe Down, United Kingdom, in 1981. Hammond returned to Edwards Air Force Base, California, in 1982, where he managed projects in the 6512 Test Squadron until being assigned as an instructor at the USAF Test Pilot School at Edwards. As a test pilot school instructor, he flew the F-4, A-7 Corsair II, and A-37, and was the High Angle of Attack program monitor, teaching stall/spin theory and flight training.

He logged over 4,500 hours in 15 American and 10 RAF aircraft.

== NASA career ==
Selected by NASA in May 1984, Hammond became an astronaut in June 1985 and qualified for assignment as a pilot/commander on Space Shuttle flight crews. His technical assignments included serving in Mission Control as an ascent/entry spacecraft communicator (CAPCOM). In that capacity he was directly involved in the decision-making process for flight rules, procedures, techniques, and launch commit criteria. He was also assigned as an Astronaut Support Person (ASP), or "Cape Crusader," responsible for monitoring Orbiter status as it undergoes testing and maintenance at John F. Kennedy Space Center during preparations for the next flight. Hammond also served as the lead astronaut supporting the Shuttle Avionics Integration Laboratory (SAIL) which tests and verifies the flight software for each Shuttle mission. Hammond was the lead astronaut supporting Orbiter software development and changes, including the Global Positioning System (GPS) avionics upgrade. He also worked on designing new cockpit flight instruments/systems displays for the Multifunctional Electronic Display System (MEDS), a major cockpit upgrade to electronic display systems. A veteran of two space flights, Hammond logged over 462 hours in space. He flew on STS-39 in 1991, and STS-64 in 1994.

Following STS-64, Hammond completed 5 months of intensive Russian language training as preparation for assignment as the Deputy for Operations, Russia. That assignment was subsequently changed to NASA Liaison to USAF HQ/AFSPC, Colorado Springs, where he worked several issues to strengthen ties between NASA, AFSPC, and USAF Astronauts. Hammond was also assigned as Lead Ascent/Entry CAPCOM for missions STS-73 through STS-78. During the same period, Hammond served as the Branch Chief of the Flight Support Branch, supervising CAPCOM and ASP activities. Hammond last assignment at NASA was as the Branch Chief of the Astronaut Office Safety Branch where he monitored all T-38, Shuttle, and Space Station safety issues.

=== Spaceflight experience ===
Hammond flew as pilot of Discovery on STS-39, the first unclassified Department of Defense mission (April 28 to May 6, 1991). He logged 199 hours and 23 minutes of space flight. The seven-man crew performed numerous scientific experiments to collect data on atmospheric infrared and ultraviolet phenomena including a deploy and rendezvous in support of the Strategic Defense Initiative Office (SDIO).

He was the pilot on STS-64 aboard the Discovery. Mission highlights included: first use of lasers for environmental research; deployment and retrieval of a solar science satellite; robotic processing of semiconductors; use of RMS boom for jet thruster research; first untethered spacewalk in 10 years to test a self-rescue jetpack. Mission duration was 10 days, 22 hours, 51 minutes.

== Aviation career ==
Hammond is a test pilot for Gulfstream Aerospace, in Las Vegas, Nevada with wife Kathy. He has a son, Michael Blaine Hammond, who lives in Houston.
