= Jan Davis =

American engineer and astronaut (born 1953)

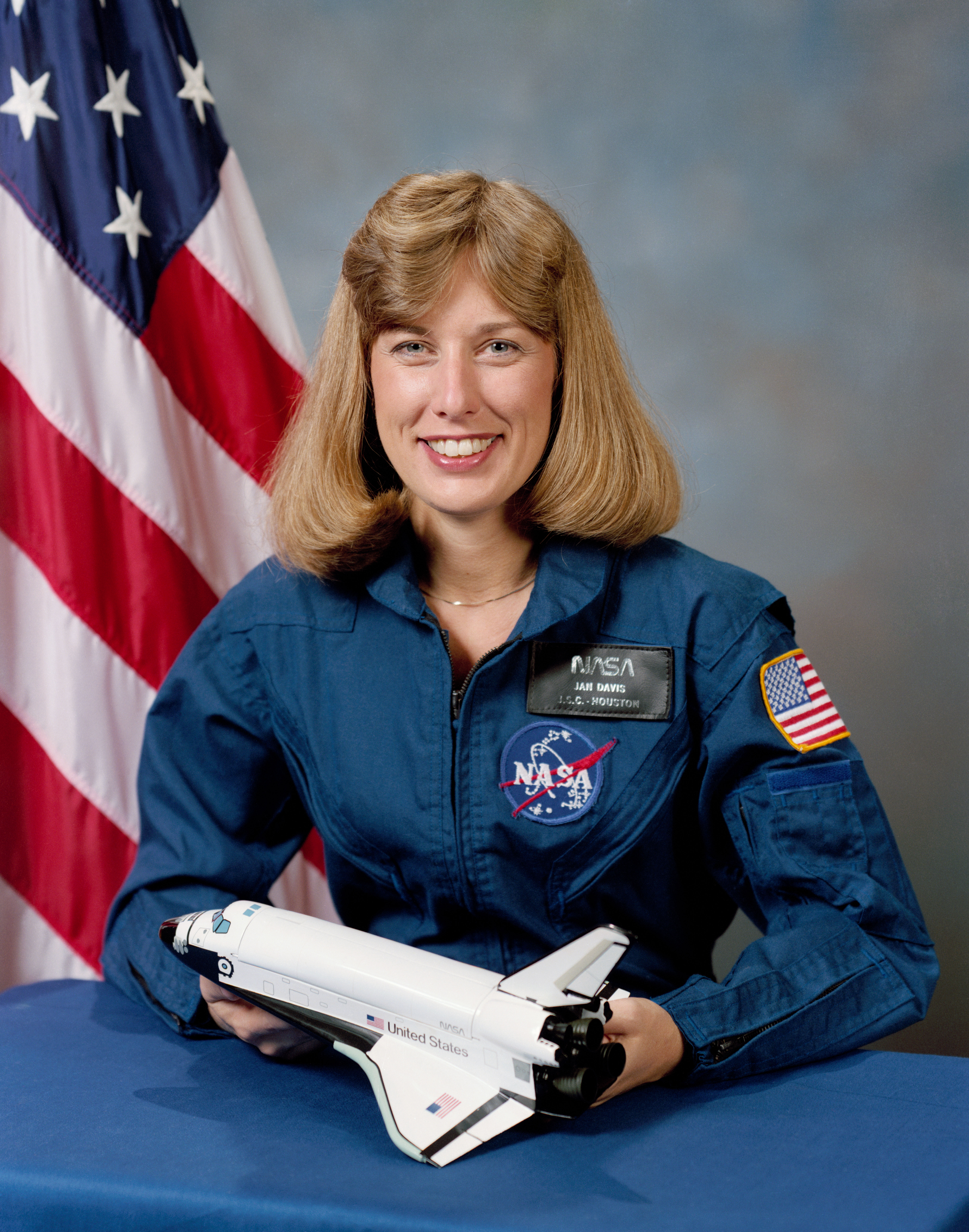
- Davis in 1987
- Born: Nancy Jan Smotherman; November 1, 1953 (age 73); Cocoa Beach, Florida, U.S.
- Education: Georgia Institute of Technology (BS); Auburn University (BS); University of Alabama in Huntsville (MS, PhD)
- Spouse: Mark C. Lee (m. 1991; div. 1999)
- Space career

NASA astronaut
- Time in space: 28 days, 2 hours, 7 minutes
- Selection: NASA Group 12 (1987)
- Mission: STS-47; STS-60; STS-85

Nancy Jan Davis (née Smotherman; born November 1, 1953) is a former American astronaut. A veteran of three space flights, Davis logged over 673 hours in space. She is now retired from NASA.

== Early life ==
Nancy Jan Davis graduated from Huntsville High School in 1971. She received a Bachelor of Science degree in applied biology from the Georgia Institute of Technology in 1975 and another in mechanical engineering from Auburn University in 1977. She received a Master of Science degree in 1983 and a Doctor of Philosophy in 1985, both in mechanical engineering at the University of Alabama in Huntsville.

== Engineering career ==
After graduating from Auburn University in 1977, Davis joined Texaco in Bellaire, Texas, working as a petroleum engineer in tertiary oil recovery. She left there in 1979 to work for NASA's Marshall Space Flight Center as an aerospace engineer. In 1986, she was named as team leader in the Structural Analysis Division, and her team was responsible for the structural analysis and verification of the Hubble Space Telescope (HST), the HST maintenance mission, and the Advanced X-Ray Astrophysics Facility. In 1987, she was also assigned to be the lead engineer for the redesign of the solid rocket booster external tank attach ring. Davis did her graduate research at the University of Alabama in Huntsville, studying the long-term strength of pressure vessels due to the viscoelastic characteristics of filament-wound composites. She holds one patent, has authored several technical papers, and is a Registered Professional Engineer.

== Astronaut career ==
Davis became an astronaut in June 1987. Her first assignment was in the Astronaut Office Mission Development Branch, where she provided technical support for Space Shuttle payloads. Following this, Davis was a CAPCOM in Mission Control, responsible for communicating with Shuttle crews for seven missions. After her first space flight, Davis served as the Astronaut Office representative for the Remote Manipulator System (RMS), with responsibility for RMS operations, training, and payloads. After her second space flight, she served as the Chairperson of the NASA Education Working Group and as Chief for the Payloads Branch, which provided Astronaut Office support for all Shuttle and International Space Station payloads. A veteran of three space flights, Davis has logged over 673 hours in space. She flew as a mission specialist on STS-47 in 1992 and STS-60 in 1994, and was the payload commander on STS-85 in 1997.

=== STS-47 ===
STS-47, Spacelab-J, was the 50th Space Shuttle mission. Launched on September 12, 1992, this cooperative venture between the United States and Japan conducted 43 experiments in life sciences and materials processing. During the eight-day mission, she was responsible for operating Spacelab and its subsystems and performing a variety of experiments. Davis's then-husband Mark C. Lee was payload commander on STS-47. After completing 126 orbits of the Earth, STS-47 Endeavour landed at Kennedy Space Center on September 20, 1992.

=== STS-60 ===
STS-60 was the second flight of Spacehab (Space Habitation Module) and the first flight of the Wake Shield Facility (WSF). Launched on February 3, 1994, this flight was the first Space Shuttle flight on which a Russian cosmonaut was a crew member. During the eight-day mission, her prime responsibility was to maneuver the WSF on the RMS, to conduct thin film crystal growth and she was also responsible for performing scientific experiments in the Spacehab. The STS-60 Discovery landed at Kennedy Space Center on February 11, 1994, after completing 130 orbits of the Earth.

=== STS-85 ===
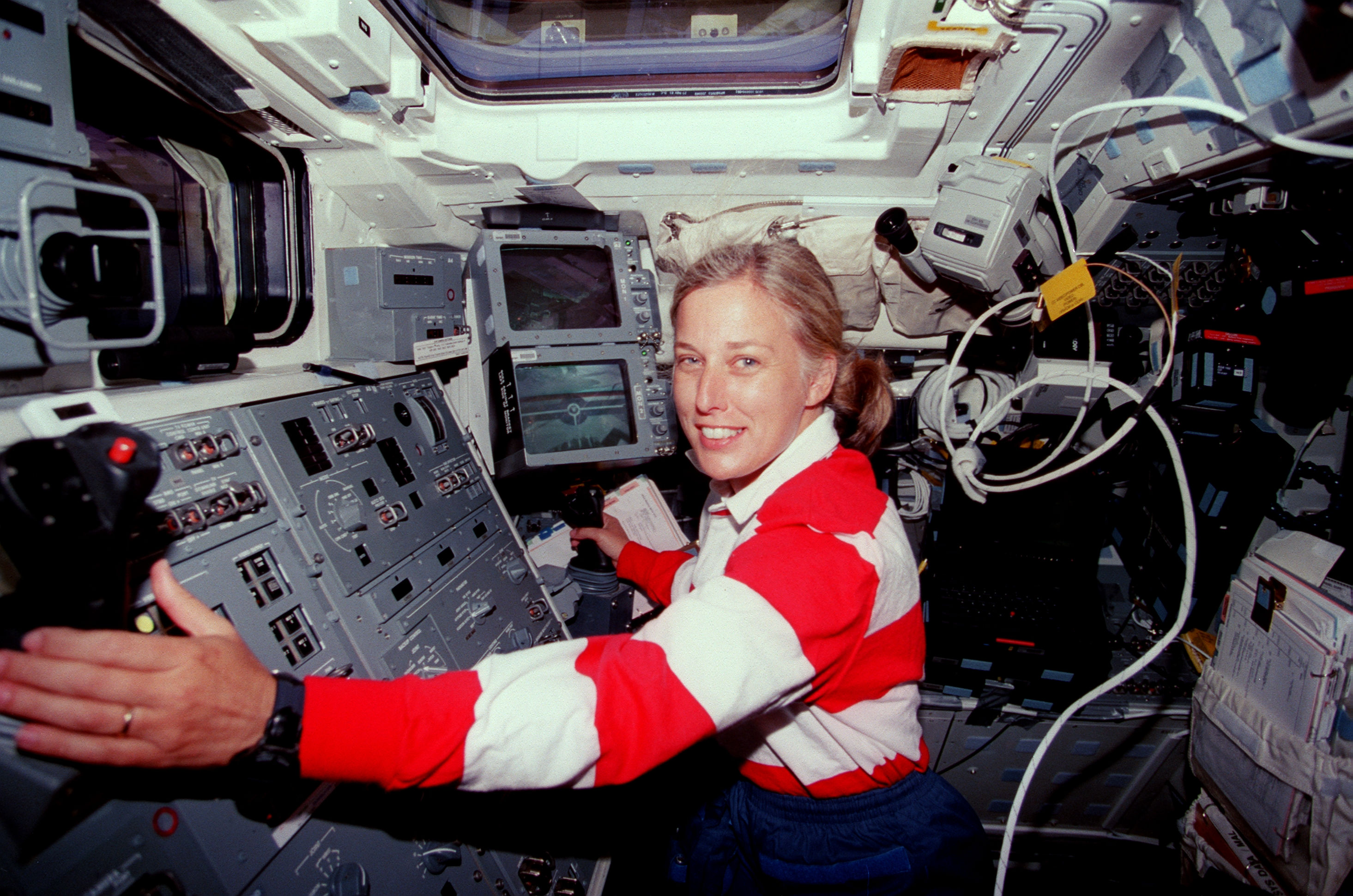
Davis operating the RMS on STS-85

Davis was the payload commander for STS-85, which was launched on Discovery on August 7, 1997. During this 12-day mission, Davis deployed and retrieved the CRISTA-SPAS payload, and operated the Japanese Manipulator Flight Demonstration (MFD) robotic arm. The mission also included several other scientific payloads for the conduct of research on astronomy, Earth sciences, life sciences, and materials science. The mission was accomplished in 189 Earth orbits, traveling 4.7 million miles. The STS-85 Discovery landed at Kennedy Space Center on August 19, 1997.

== Later NASA career ==
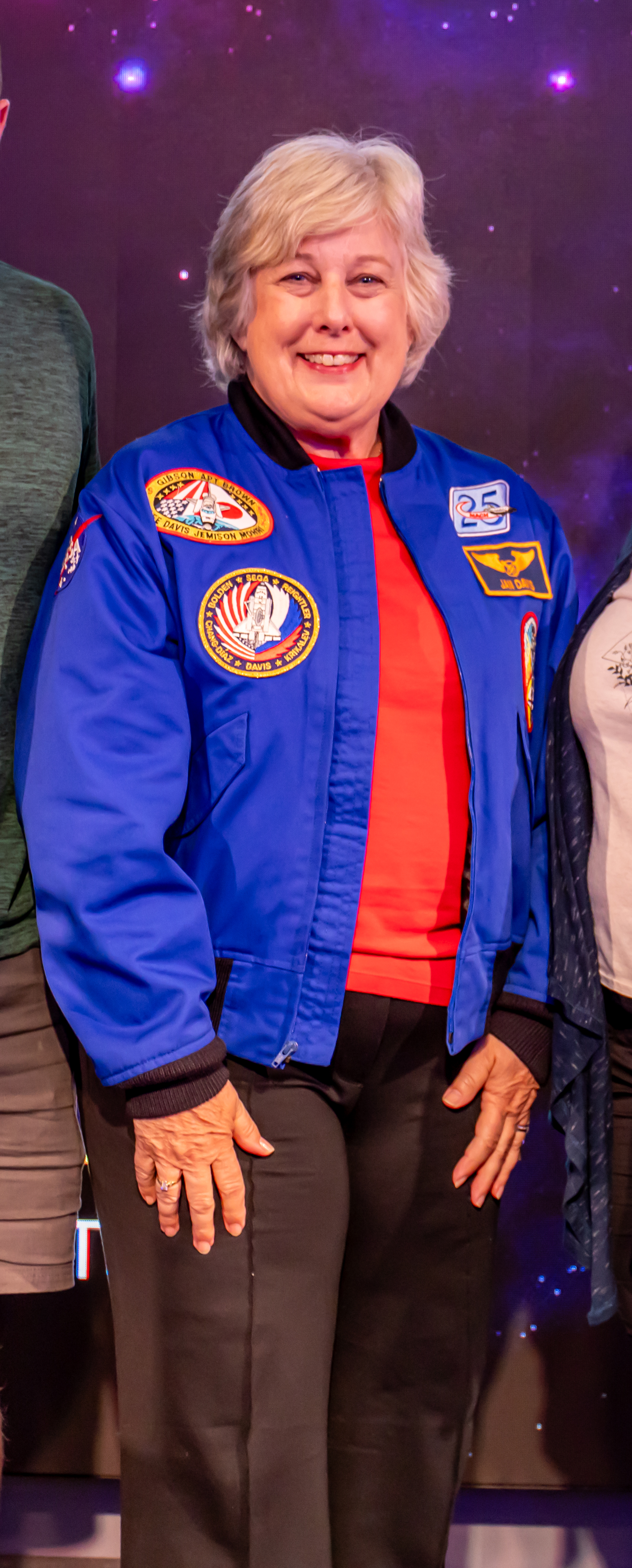
Jan Davis in 2024.

After her flight on STS-85, Davis was assigned to NASA Headquarters as the Director of the Human Exploration and Development of Space (HEDS), Independent Assurance Office for the Office of Safety and Mission Assurance. In that position, Davis managed and directed independent assessments for the programs and projects assigned to the HEDS enterprise. In July 1999, she transferred to the Marshall Space Flight Center as Director of the Flight Projects Directorate, which was responsible for the International Space Station (ISS) Payload Operations Center, ISS hardware and the Chandra X-ray Observatory Program. After the Columbia accident, she was named head of Safety and Mission Assurance at Marshall, where she assured the safe return to flight of the Space Shuttle. Davis retired from NASA in 2005 and worked for Jacobs Engineering Group as a Vice President and Deputy General Manager. She currently works for Bastion Technologies, Inc. as the Safety and Mission Assurance Support Contract Program Manager at the Marshall Space Flight Center.

In 2023, Davis authored her first book "Air Born - Two Generations in Flight", about her father who was a WWII B-17 pilot and POW, and her own space flight career, using comparisons of their two careers. In 2024, she published a companion book to the first, "Air Born - Artistic Musings of a WWII Pilot and POW," which includes her father's POW Wartime Log and the 96 PENNY cartoon he drew for the Stalag Luft III newspaper.

== Personal life ==
Davis married fellow astronaut Mark C. Lee, in January 1991. They were the first married couple to fly together in space, joined in 2022 by Sharon and Marc Hagle on Blue Origin's NS-20. They divorced in 1999.

She is married to former Judge Schuyler Richardson.

== Medals and honors ==
She has been awarded the NASA Outstanding Leadership Medal in 1998, the NASA Exceptional Service Medal in 1995 and 2002, and the NASA Space Flight Medal in 1992, 1994, and 1997, the NASA Fellowship for Full-Time Study in 1983, the ASME National Old Guard Prize in 1978, the ASME Ralph Coates Roe Medal in 2001. She has been inducted to the Alabama Aviation Hall of Fame, the Alabama Engineering Hall of Fame, and the Presidential Rank Award of Meritorious Executive.
