= Sharon Caples McDougle =

American spacesuit technician

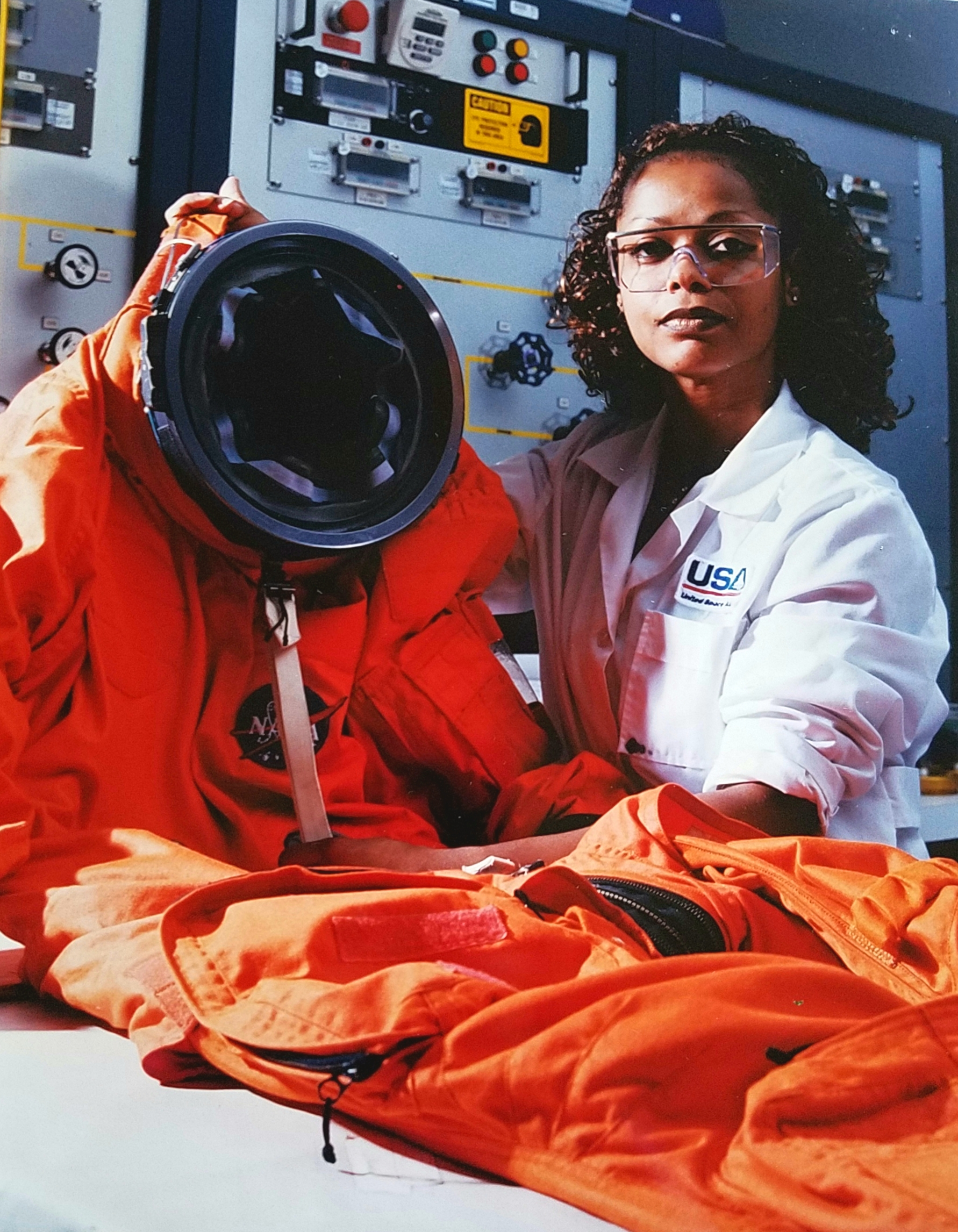
- Born: Moss Point
- Employer: NASA (1990–2012)
- Awards: Silver Snoopy award
- Website: smcdougle2.wixsite.com/sharoncaplesmcdougle

Sharon Caples McDougle is an American retired spacesuit technician for National Aeronautics and Space Administration, crew chief, and manager of the Space Shuttle Crew Escape Equipment Processing department. She is the first Black woman to serve in these roles.

== Early life and education ==
Sharon Caples McDougle was born in Moss Point, Mississippi. In 1982, she joined the US Air Force after graduating from Moss Point High School.

== Career ==
From 1982 to 1990 she worked as an Aerospace Physiology Specialist at Beale Air Force Base in California. She was responsible for training SR-71 and U-2 pilots in hypobaric and hyperbaric operations. McDougle specialized in working with pressure suits. She fitted the suits to individual pilots and suited up the pilots for training flights and missions. Between missions, she inspected and maintained pressure suits and survival equipment. McDougle traveled to England, Greece, Korea, and Japan in support of SR-71 and U-2 operations. During her service, she received numerous awards including the Humanitarian Service Medal and was recognized as Airman of the Month.

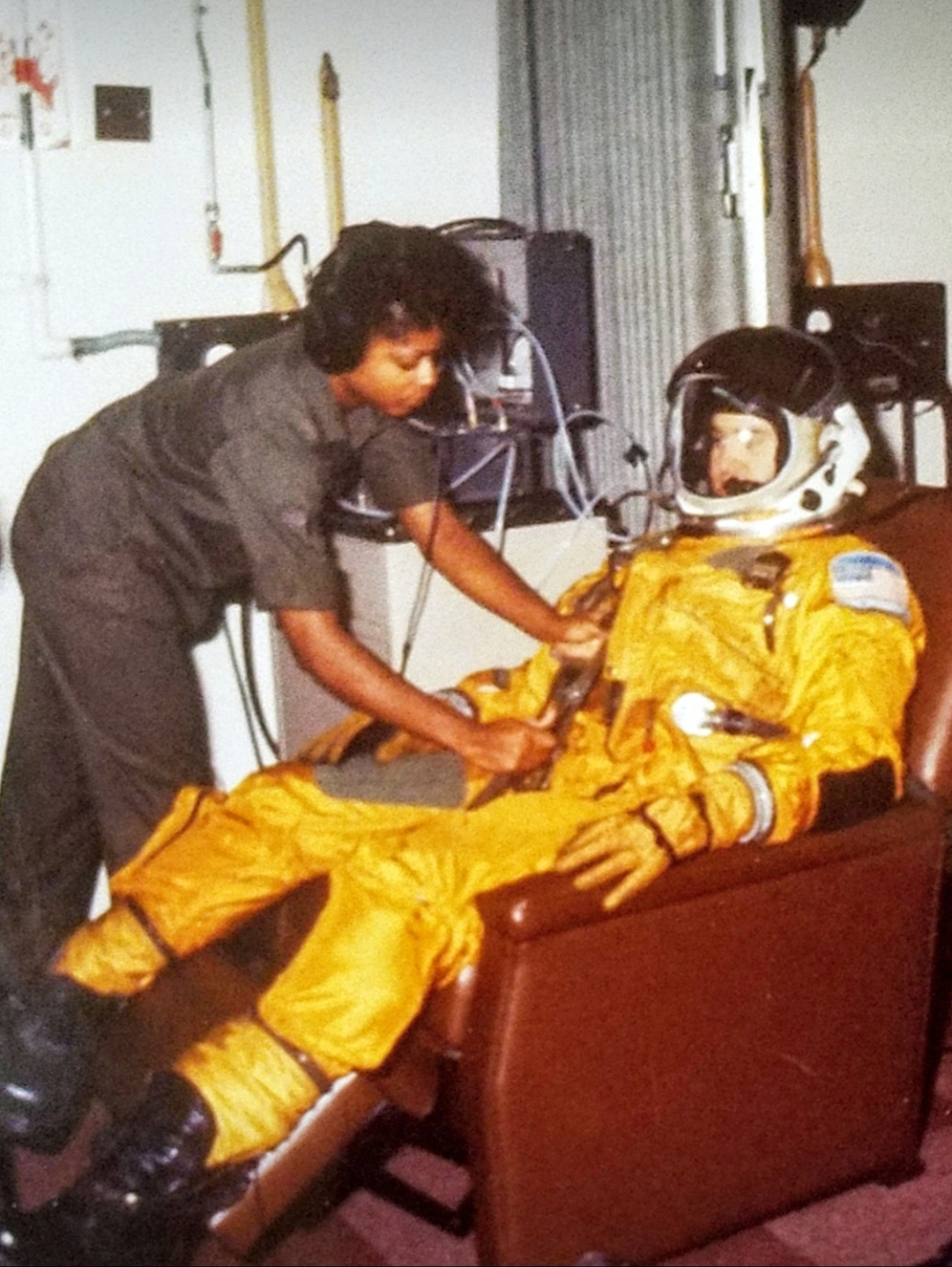
Sharon McDougle checking Air Force suit

After leaving the Air Force with an honorable discharge, McDougle transferred her special skills to the US space program. In 1990, she joined the Space Shuttle Crew Escape Equipment (CEE) department of Boeing Aerospace Operations, a contractor for NASA. Her first mission was STS-37.

She suited up Mae Jemison, the first Black woman in NASA's astronaut corps, for STS-47. McDougle led the first all-women team of spacesuit technicians in support of STS-78.

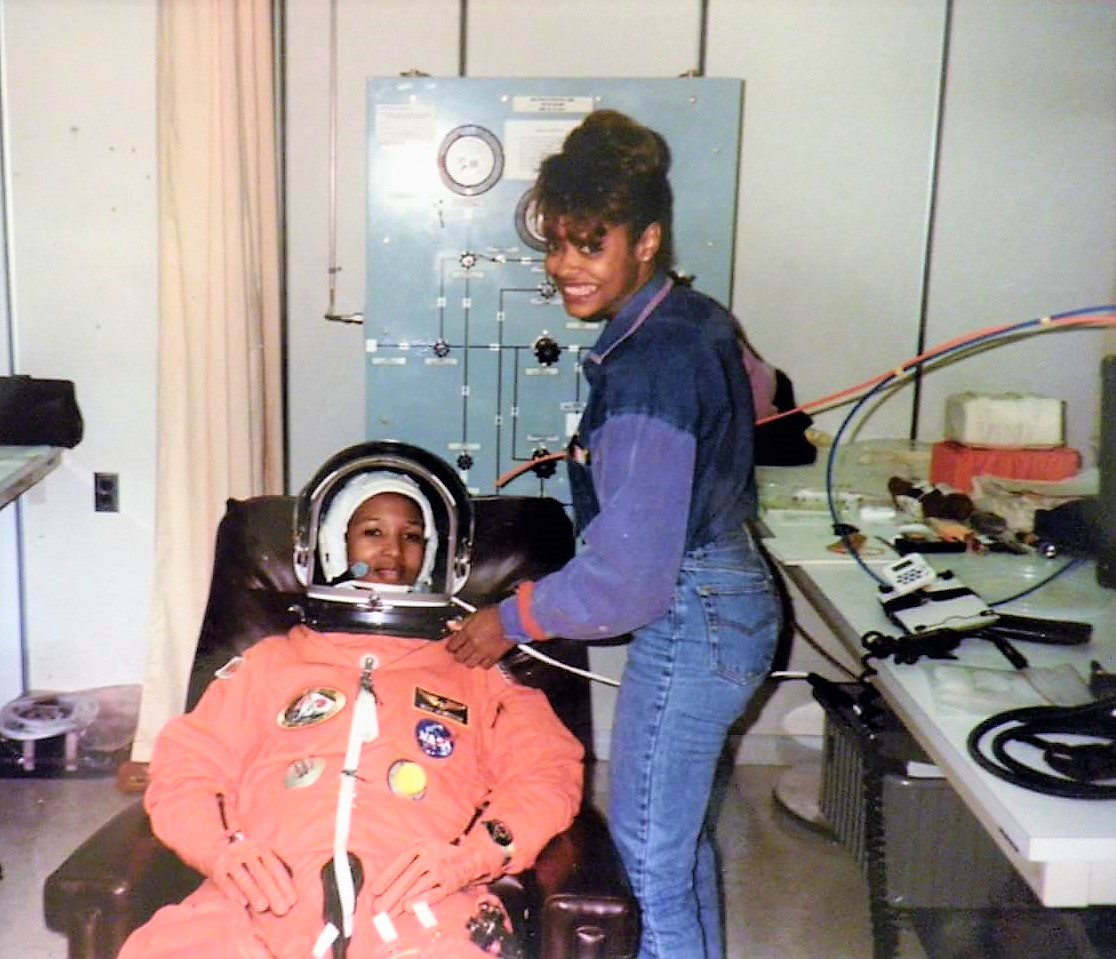
Sharon McDougle and Mae Jemison in KSC Suit Room

McDougle worked with NASA's Launch and Entry Suits. She maintained and repaired spacesuits and dressed astronauts for training events and space missions. She was the first Black person and second woman to work as a spacesuit technician. She was promoted in 1994 to CEE Crew Chief and again in 2004 to Manager of the CEE Department. McDougle retired in 2012 following the end of the Space Shuttle program in 2011.

== Awards and honors ==
Sharon Caples McDougle received the Silver Snoopy award in 2001.

Mississippi Trailblazers recognized McDougle with its Dr. Cindy Ayers "Legacy" Award and Calvin "Buck" Buchanan "First" Award.
