= Cobalt nitrate =

Cobalt nitrate can refer to:

- Cobalt(II) nitrate and its several hydrates
- Cobalt(III) nitrate, a diamagnetic volatile compound
