= Bernard A. Harris Jr. =

American astronaut (born 1956)

Bernard Harris
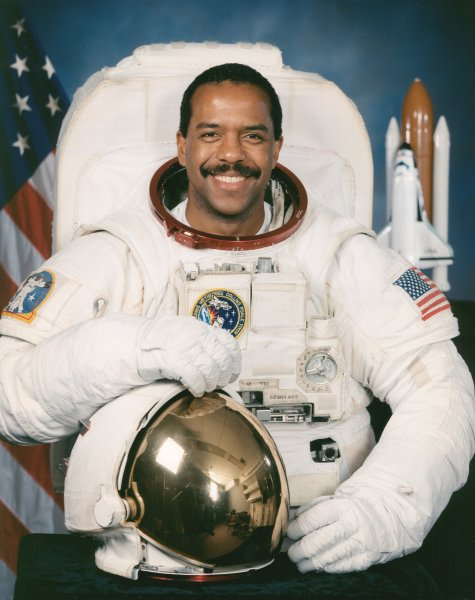
- Born: Bernard Anthony Harris Jr. June 26, 1956 (age 70); Temple, Texas, U.S.
- Education: University of Houston (BS, MBA); Texas Tech University (MD); University of Texas, Galveston (MS)
- Space career

NASA astronaut
- Time in space: 18d 6h 8m
- Selection: NASA Group 13 (1990)
- Total EVAs: 1
- Total EVA time: 4h 39m
- Missions: STS-55; STS-63
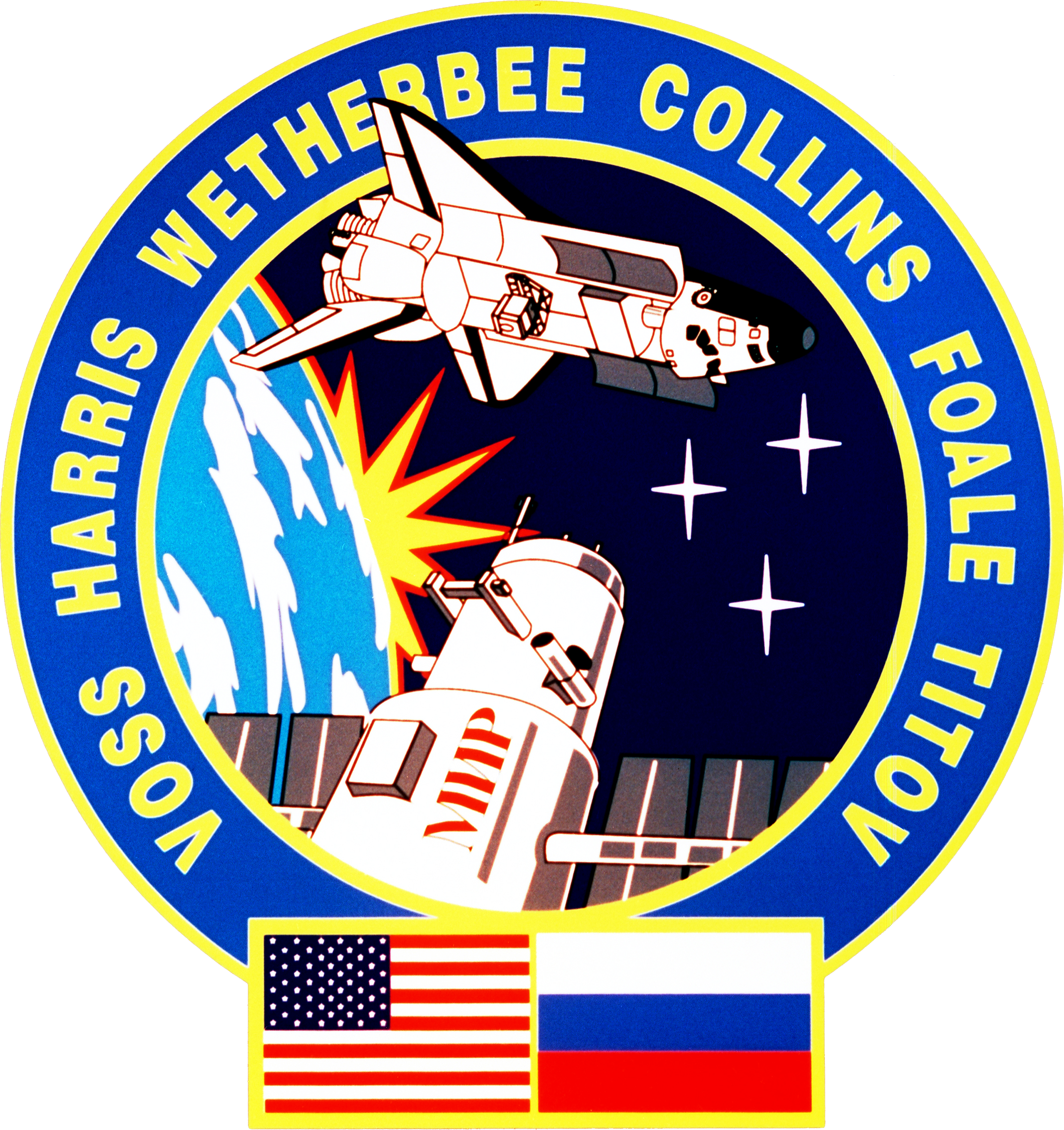
- Mission insignia

Bernard Anthony Harris Jr. (born June 26, 1956) is a former NASA astronaut. On February 9, 1995, Harris became the first African American to perform an extra-vehicular activity (spacewalk), during the second of his two Space Shuttle flights.

== Early life ==
Harris was born on June 26, 1956 in Temple, Texas. His parents were Bernard A. Harris, Sr. and Gussie Emanual Harris. His parents divorced when he was six years old. Seeing his father struggle to find work — having only had a tenth grade education — inspired Harris to pursue STEM.

Harris first became interested in being an astronaut after watching the Apollo 11 mission on TV in 1969 at 13 years old. With the help of his science teacher, he formed a science club and a rocket club with some other students.

== Education ==
Harris graduated from Sam Houston High School in San Antonio, Texas, in 1974, where he was actively involved in science fairs, book clubs and other school activities. He received a Bachelor of Science degree in biology from the University of Houston in 1978. He earned his Doctor of Medicine degree from the Texas Tech University Health Sciences Center School of Medicine in 1982. Harris completed a residency in internal medicine at the Mayo Clinic in 1985. Harris is a member of Kappa Alpha Psi fraternity.

Harris completed a National Research Council Fellowship at NASA's Ames Research Center in 1987. While at Ames, he conducted research in musculature physiology and disuse.

He also trained as a flight surgeon at the Aerospace School of Medicine at Brooks Air Force Base in San Antonio in 1988. Dr. Harris received a Master of Science degree in biomedical science from the University of Texas Medical Branch in 1996, and a Master of Business Administration from the University of Houston in 1999. Harris is also a licensed private pilot and certified scuba diver.

After completing his fellowship at NASA Ames, he joined NASA's Johnson Space Center as a clinical scientist and flight surgeon, where he conducted clinical investigations of space adaptation and developed countermeasures for extended duration space flight.

He was the first African American man to go in space as one of NASA's research teams and he was involved in the construction of the space rovers.

== Astronaut experience ==
Selected by NASA in January 1990, Harris became an astronaut in July 1991, and qualified for assignment as a mission specialist on future Space Shuttle flight crews. He served as the crew representative for Shuttle Software in the Astronaut Office Operations Development Branch. Harris was assigned as a mission specialist on STS-55, Spacelab D-2, in August 1991. He flew on board Columbia for ten days, (26 April 1993 – 6 May 1993); on the mission the Shuttle reached one year of accumulated flight time. Harris was part of the payload crew of Spacelab D-2, conducting a variety of research in physical and life sciences. During this flight, Harris logged over 239 hours and 4,164,183 miles in space.

His second mission was as the payload commander on STS-63 ( February 2, 1995 – February 11, 1995), the first flight of the new joint Russian-American Space Program. Mission highlights included the first rendezvous (but not docking) with the Russian space station Mir and retrieval of Spartan 204 satellite. During the flight, Harris became the first African-American to walk in space, while fellow astronaut Michael Foale became the first British-born spacewalker. (It was also on this flight that Eileen Collins became the first female Shuttle pilot.) On this mission, Harris logged 198 hours, 29 minutes in space, completed 129 orbits, and traveled over 2.9 million miles.

== Post-NASA career ==
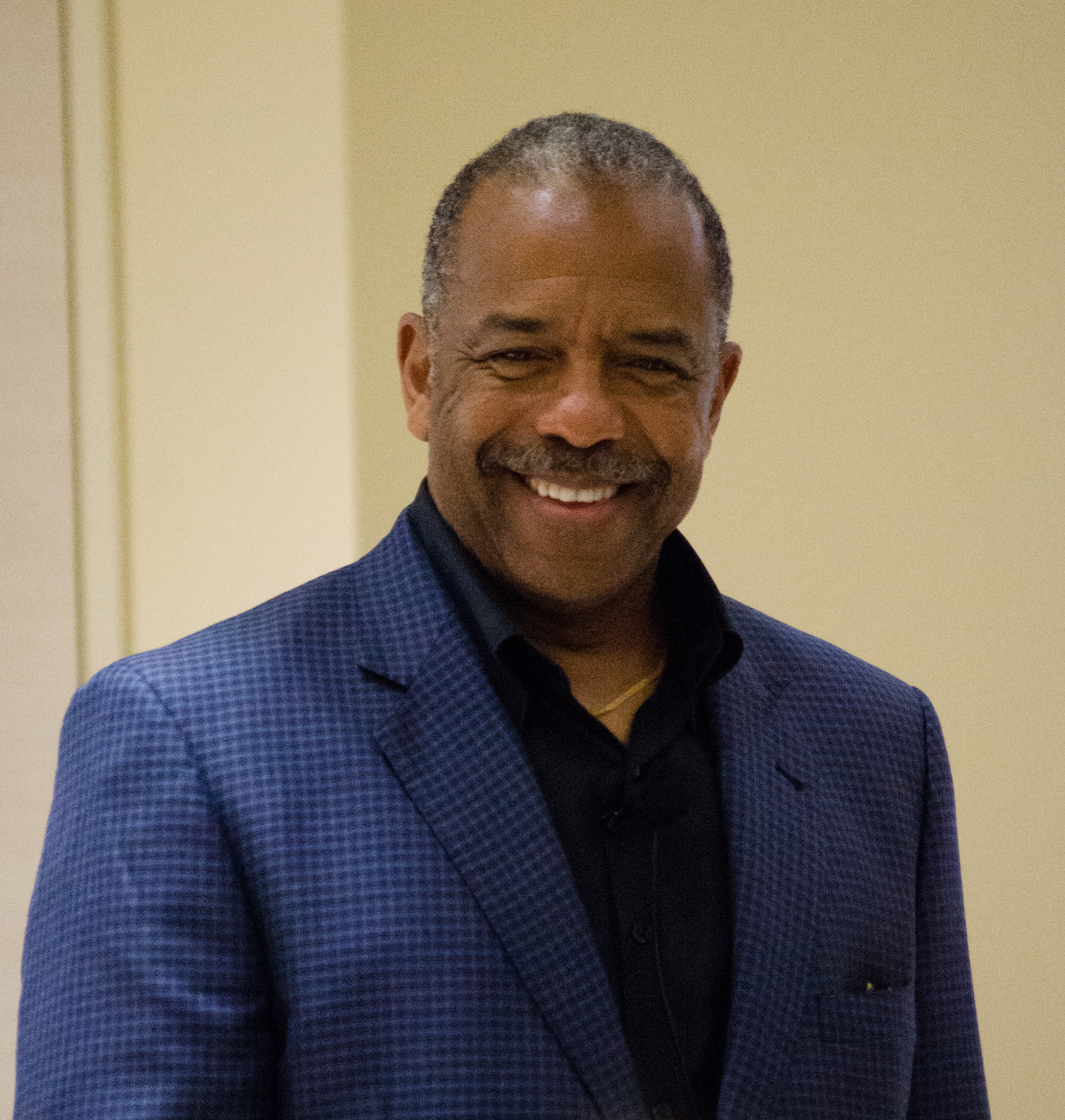
Harris at the 2014 TouchTomorrow Festival held at Worcester Polytechnic Institute in Worcester, Massachusetts.

Harris left NASA in April 1996, but has continued research. He served as Vice President of SPACEHAB, Inc., and innovative space commercialization company, where he directed the company's space science business. He also served as Vice President of Business Development for Space Media, Inc., an Informatics company, establishing an e-commerce initiative that is now part of the United Nations' education program.

In 1998, he founded The Harris Foundation, a Houston, Texas-based non-profit organization, whose stated mission is "to invest in community-based initiatives to support education, health and wealth. THF supports programs that empower individuals, in particular minorities and other economically and/or socially disadvantaged, to recognize their potential and pursue their dreams."

In 2008, he appeared in Microsoft's "I'm a P.C." ad campaign. Harris also gave a keynote speech at the Exxon Mobil Texas State Science and Engineering Fair.

In 2009, he was elected vice president of the American Telemedicine Association. He was elected president of the American Telemedicine Association in 2011, serving for a one-year term that ended in 2012.

In 2010, he was part of the Dream Tour where he travelled to over 30 schools around the country.

Currently, Harris is CEO of the National Math and Science Initiative and president and chief executive officer of Vesalius Ventures, Inc., a venture capital accelerator, that invests in early-stage companies in medical informatics and technology.

As of April 19, 2021, Harris serves on the board of directors for commercial aerospace and weapons manufacturer Raytheon Technologies.

== Organizations and honors ==
Harris is a member of many professional, academic and service organizations, including the following:

- American College of Physicians
- Phi Kappa Phi honor society
- Kappa Alpha Psi fraternity

He has served as a board member for the following organizations:

- Board of Regents of the Texas Tech University System (late 1990s)
- Boys and Girls Club of Houston
- National Math and Science Initiative (CEO)
- Medical Informatics
- Technology and Applications Center
- Houston Technology Center
- National Space Biomedical Research Institute
- Board of Scientific Counselors

He has been recognized several times by NASA and other organizations for his professional and academic achievements. Harris has also received a number of other honorary doctorates from the following institutions:

- New Jersey Institute of Technology
- Indiana Institute of Technology
- Morehouse College School of Medicine (1996)
- University of Hartford (2008)
- Stonybrook University (2006)
- New Jersey Institute of Technology
- Washington & Jefferson College (2013)
- Worcester Polytechnic Institute (2015)
- University of Houston (2021)
- University of Houston
- University of the Sciences, now called St. Joseph's University (2021)

He has also received the following awards:

- a NASA Space flight medal (1993, 1995)
- a NASA Award of Merit (1996)
- a fellow of the American College of Physicians
- Horatio Alger Award (2000)
- James Bryant Conant Award (2021)
- National Space Grant Distinguished Service Award (2022)

In 2005, the North East Independent School District in San Antonio, Texas named a middle school under construction after Harris. Bernard Harris Middle School opened August 14, 2006, to have a capacity of 1500 students.

== Personal life ==
In 1989, Harris married Sandra Fay Lewis. In 1992, the couple had a daughter named Brooke Alexandria Harris. Harris and Lewis divorced in 2008.

== See also ==
- List of African-American astronauts
