= STS-99 =

2000 American crewed spaceflight to conduct the Shuttle Radar Topography Mission

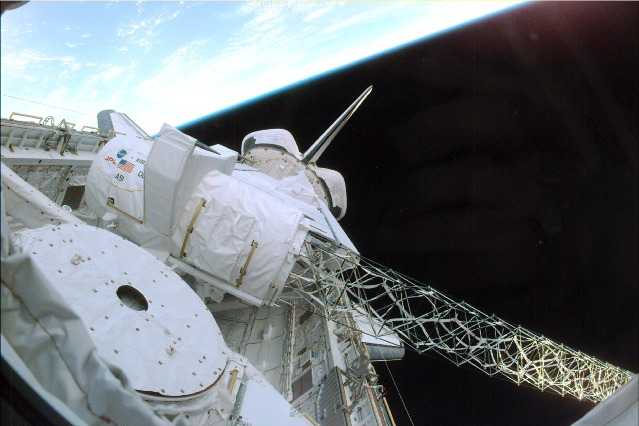
- The SRTM radar boom in Endeavour's payload bay, extending 60 meters off the vehicle's port side
- Names: Space Transportation System-99
- Mission type: Radar imaging
- Operator: NASA
- COSPAR ID: 2000-010A
- SATCAT no.: 26088
- Mission duration: 11 days, 5 hours, 39 minutes, 41 seconds
- Distance travelled: 6,540,000 kilometers (4,060,000 mi)

Spacecraft properties
- Spacecraft: Space Shuttle Endeavour
- Launch mass: 116,376 kilograms (256,565 lb)
- Landing mass: 102,363 kilograms (225,672 lb)
- Payload mass: 13,154 kilograms (29,000 lb)

Crew
- Crew size: 6
- Members: Kevin R. Kregel; Dominic L. Pudwill Gorie; Gerhard P.J. Thiele; Janet L. Kavandi; Janice E. Voss; Mamoru "Mark" Mohri

Start of mission
- Launch date: 11 February 2000, 17:43 UTC
- Launch site: Kennedy, LC-39A

End of mission
- Landing date: 22 February 2000, 23:23 UTC
- Landing site: Kennedy, SLF Runway 33

Orbital parameters
- Reference system: Geocentric
- Regime: Low Earth
- Perigee altitude: 224 kilometres (139 mi)
- Apogee altitude: 242 kilometres (150 mi)
- Inclination: 57.0 degrees
- Period: 89.2 minutes
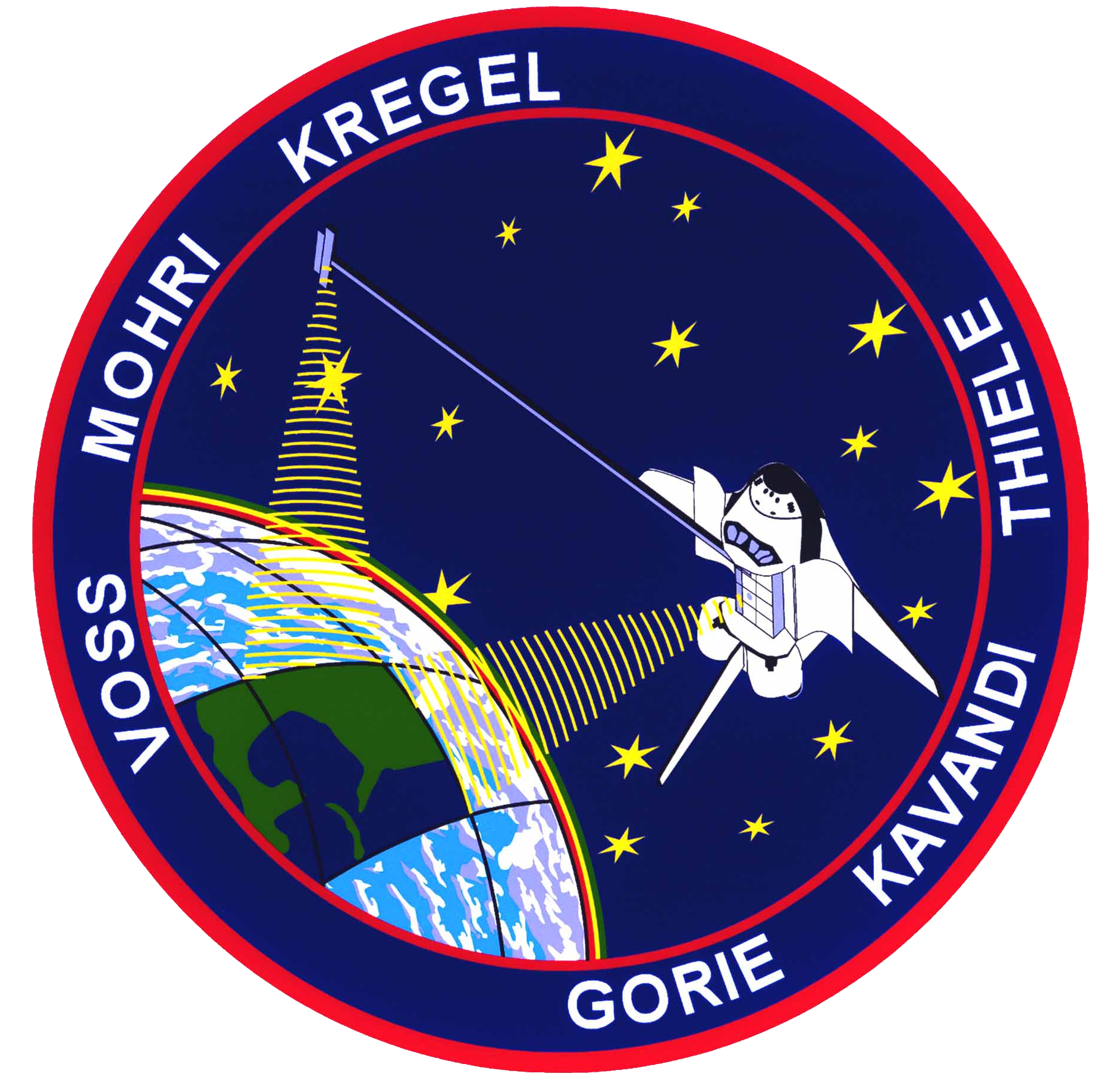
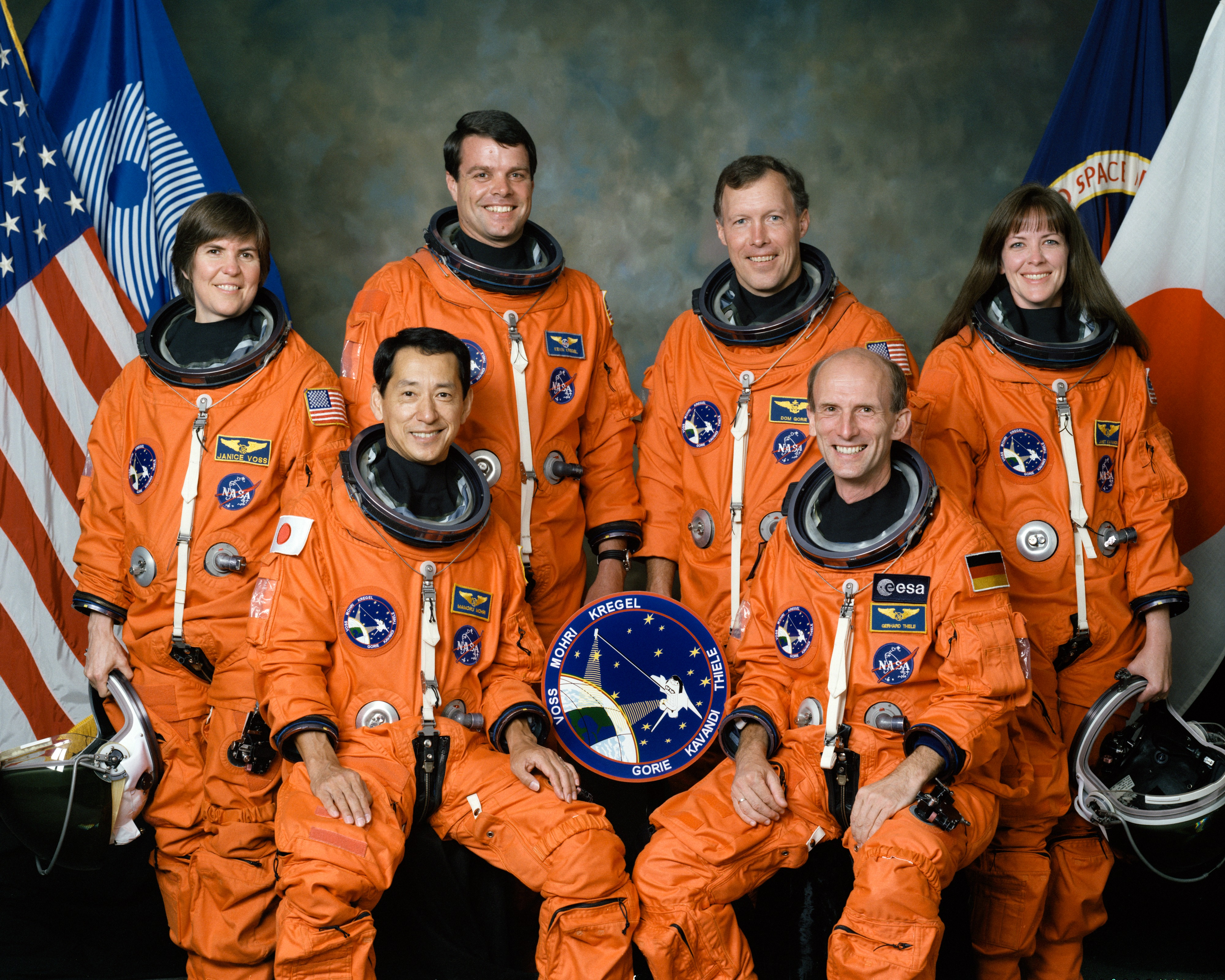
- STS-99 mission patch Left to right - Front: Mohri, Thiele; Back: Voss, Kregel, Gorie, Kavandi Space Shuttle program

STS-99 was a Space Shuttle mission using Endeavour, that launched on 11 February 2000 from Kennedy Space Center, Florida. The primary objective of the mission was the Shuttle Radar Topography Mission (SRTM) project. This was also the last solo flight of Endeavour; all future flights for Endeavour became devoted to the International Space Station. STS-99 was also the first Shuttle mission of the 2000s.

== Crew ==
Position	Astronaut
Commander	(United States) Kevin R. Kregel; Fourth and last spaceflight
Pilot	(United States) Dominic L. Pudwill Gorie; Second spaceflight
Mission Specialist 1	(Germany) Gerhard P.J. Thiele; Only spaceflight
Mission Specialist 2 Flight Engineer	(United States) Janet L. Kavandi; Second spaceflight
Mission Specialist 3	(United States) Janice E. Voss; Fifth and last spaceflight
Mission Specialist 4	(Japan) Mamoru Mohri, NASDA; Second and last spaceflight
Member of Blue Team; Member of Red Team

=== Crew seat assignments ===
Seat	Launch	Landing	Seats 1–4 are on the flight deck. Seats 5–7 are on the mid-deck.
1	Kregel		Seats 1–4 are on the flight deck. Seats 5–7 are on the mid-deck.
2	Gorie		Seats 1–4 are on the flight deck. Seats 5–7 are on the mid-deck.
3	Thiele	Mohri	Seats 1–4 are on the flight deck. Seats 5–7 are on the mid-deck.
4	Kavandi		Seats 1–4 are on the flight deck. Seats 5–7 are on the mid-deck.
5	Voss		Seats 1–4 are on the flight deck. Seats 5–7 are on the mid-deck.
6	Unused		Seats 1–4 are on the flight deck. Seats 5–7 are on the mid-deck.
7	Mohri	Thiele	Seats 1–4 are on the flight deck. Seats 5–7 are on the mid-deck.

== Mission highlights ==
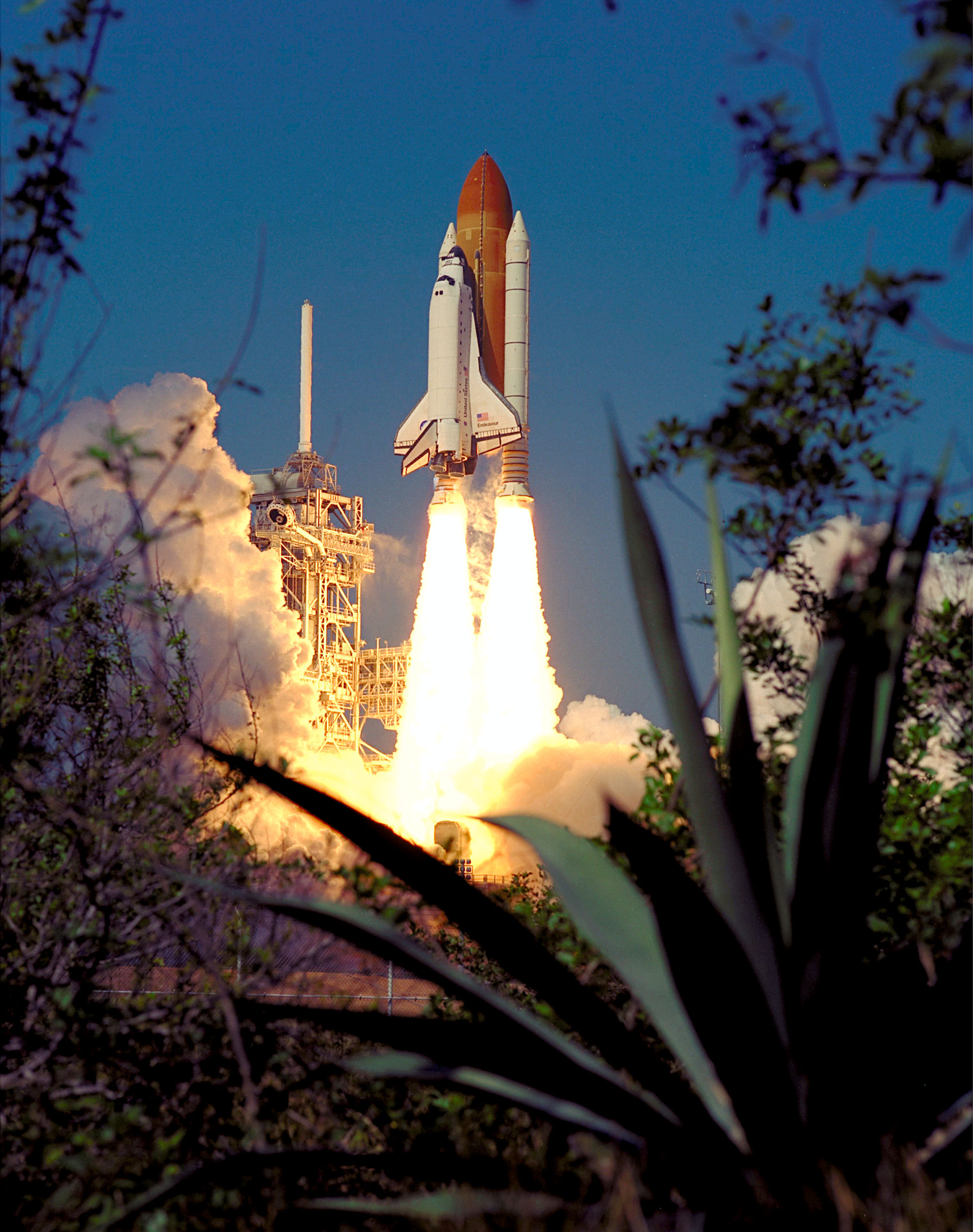
STS-99 launches from Kennedy Space Center, 11 February 2000.

The Shuttle Radar Topography Mission (SRTM) was an international project spearheaded by the National Imagery and Mapping Agency (now the National Geospatial-Intelligence Agency), an agency within the U.S. Department of Defense, and NASA, with participation of the German Aerospace Center DLR. Its objective was to obtain the most complete high-resolution digital topographic database of the Earth. SRTM consisted of a specially modified radar system that flew onboard Endeavour during its 11-day mission. This radar system gathered around 8 terabytes of data to produce high-quality three-dimensional images of the Earth's surface.

SRTM used C-band and X-band interferometric synthetic aperture radar (IFSAR) to acquire topographic data of Earth's land mass (between 60°N and 56°S). It produced digital topographic map products which met Interferometric Terrain Height Data (ITHD)-2 specifications (30 meter x 30 meter spatial sampling with 16 meter absolute vertical height accuracy, 10 meter relative vertical height accuracy and 20 meter absolute horizontal circular accuracy). The result of the Shuttle Radar Topography Mission was close to 1 trillion measurements of the Earth's topography. Besides contributing to the production of better maps, these measurements could lead to improved water drainage modeling, more realistic flight simulators, better locations for cell phone towers, and enhanced navigation safety.

The Shuttle Radar Topography Mission mast was deployed successfully to its full length, and the antenna was turned to its operation position. After a successful checkout of the radar systems, mapping began at 00:31 EST, less than 12 hours after launch. Crewmembers split into two shifts so they could work around the clock, and began mapping an area from 60 degrees north to 56 degrees south. Data was sent to the Jet Propulsion Laboratory for analysis, and early indications showed the data to be of excellent quality.

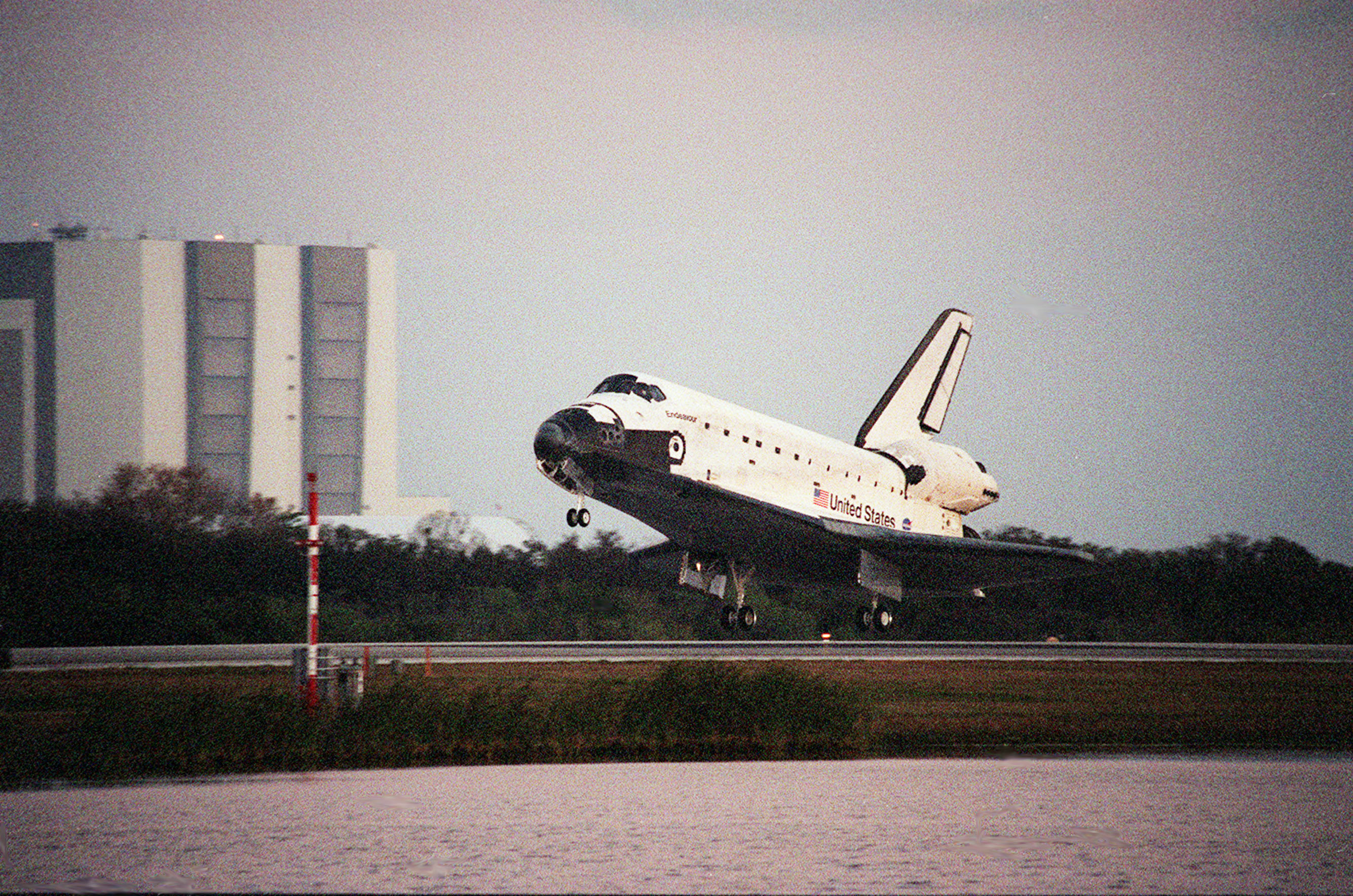
STS-99 ends as Space Shuttle Endeavour lands at the Shuttle Landing Facility, 22 February 2000.

Mapping proceeded fairly smoothly, but during an attitude-hold period for payload mapping during the second day of flight, it was determined that orbiter propellant usage had doubled from 0.07 to 0.15% an hour. The increase was caused by a failure of the payload cold-gas thrust system that was used to offset the gravity gradient torque of the mast. As a result of this failure, orbiter propellant was being used at a higher-than-planned rate to maintain the attitude of the vehicle. Measures to reduce the expenditure were evaluated and based on the analysis, enough propellant could be saved to complete the planned 9-day plus science mission.

The first of a series of "flycast" maneuvers during the mission was also made on the second day of flight. The flycast maneuver was designed to reduce strain on the almost 200 foot (61 m) mast extending from Endeavour's payload bay when adjustments to Endeavour's orbit were needed.

The orbiter, which flew tail-first during mapping operations, was moved to a nose-first attitude with the mast extending upward. A brief reaction control system pulse began the maneuver. This caused the mast to deflect slightly backwards then rebound forward. As it reached vertical, a stronger thrust was applied, arresting the mast's motion and increasing the orbiter's speed.

Radar data gathering concluded at 06:54 EST on the tenth day of flight after a final sweep across Australia. During 222 hours and 23 minutes of mapping, Endeavour's radar images filled 332 high density tapes and covered 99.98% of the planned mapping area – land between 60 degrees north latitude and 56 degrees south latitude – at least once and 94.6% of it twice. Only about 80,000 square miles (210,000 km^{2}) in scattered areas remained unimaged, most of them in North America and most already well mapped by other methods. Enough data was gathered to fill the equivalent of 20,000 CDs.

Also aboard Endeavour was a student experiment called EarthKAM, which took 2,715 digital photos during the mission through an overhead flight-deck window. The NASA-sponsored program allowed middle school students to select photo targets and receive the images via the Internet. The pictures were used in classroom projects on Earth science, geography, mathematics and space science. More than 75 middle schools around the world participated in the experiment, which set a record. On four previous flights combined, EarthKAM sent down a total of 2,018 images.

STS-99 also saw the recommissioning of the Spacelab pallet system, despite the Spacelab system being discontinued almost two years prior.

The 2007 Smithsonian Networks documentary Oasis Earth was made about the mission, containing HD video from inside Endeavour, including many views looking at the Earth below. One highlight of the documentary features Mamoru Mohri shooting video of the Moon and Mount Fuji.

This was the last mission to fly with the original Space Shuttle cockpit layout in 18 straight years. Although the next mission (STS-101) featured the "glass cockpit" on Atlantis, Endeavour and sister orbiter Discovery continued flying with the original cockpit layout until after the Columbia disaster. (Note: Columbia flew with the "glass cockpit" for the first time on STS-109, its final successful mission, in 2002.)

Attempt	Planned	Result	Turnaround	Reason	Decision point	Weather go (%)	Notes
1	31 Jan 2000, 12:47:00 pm	Scrubbed	—	Technical	31 Jan 2000, 2:08 pm (T−00:09:00 hold)	60%	Avionics problem.
2	1 Feb 2000, 12:44:00 pm	Scrubbed	0 days 23 hours 57 minutes	Technical	1 Feb 2000, 3:30 am	60%	Avionics problem.
3	11 Feb 2000, 12:43:40 pm	Success	9 days 23 hours 60 minutes			90%	

== Wake-up calls ==
NASA began a tradition of playing music to astronauts during the Gemini program, which was first used to wake up a flight crew during Apollo 10. Each track is specially chosen, often by their families, and usually has a special meaning to an individual member of the crew, or is applicable to their daily activities. While the crew of STS-99 worked shifts in "red" and "blue" teams to work around the clock, on this mission each shift was still awoken with a wake-up call. The only other two-shift shuttle mission to do so was STS-107.

Flight Day	Team	Song	Artist/Performer	Played for	Link
Day 1	Blue Team	"Time for Me to Fly"	REO Speedwagon		WAV
Day 2	Red Team; Blue Team	"Some Guys Have All The Luck" "Eye in the Sky"	Robert Palmer; Alan Parsons Project		WAV; WAV
Day 3	Red Team; Blue Team	"Jumpin' Jive" "Linus and Lucy"	Cab Calloway/Joe Jackson; Vince Guaraldi		WAV; WAV
Day 4	Red Team; Blue Team	"Radar Love" "Journey to the Stars"	Golden Earring; Godiego		WAV; WAV
Day 5	Red Team; Blue Team	"New York, New York" "Canon in D"	Frank Sinatra; Johann Pachebel / George Winston	Kevin Kregel (Note: For all the "New York natives" onboard, including Kregel.)	WAV; WAV
Day 6	Red Team; Blue Team	"Smack Dab in the Middle" "We Saw the Sea"	Ray Charles; U.S. Naval Academy Glee Club		WAV; WAV
Day 7	Red Team; Blue Team	"Die Moldau" "Take a Little Less"	Boston Symphony Orchestra; Barton and Sweeney		WAV; WAV
Day 8	Red Team; Blue Team	"Magic Carpet Ride" "Rawhide"	Steppenwolf; Frankie Laine		WAV; WAV
Day 9	Red Team; Blue Team	"Catch the Moments As They Fly (Shannon River Dance)" "One After 909"	Traditional Celtic Music / Jeff Victor; The Beatles	Kevin Kregel	WAV; WAV
Day 10	Red Team	"Walk Don't Run"	California Guitar Trio		WAV
Day 11	Blue Team	"Stay"	Frankie Valli and the Four Seasons		Not listed

== See also ==
- List of human spaceflights
- List of Space Shuttle missions
- Outline of space science
