= Janice E. Voss =

American astronaut and engineer (1956–2012)

Janice Voss
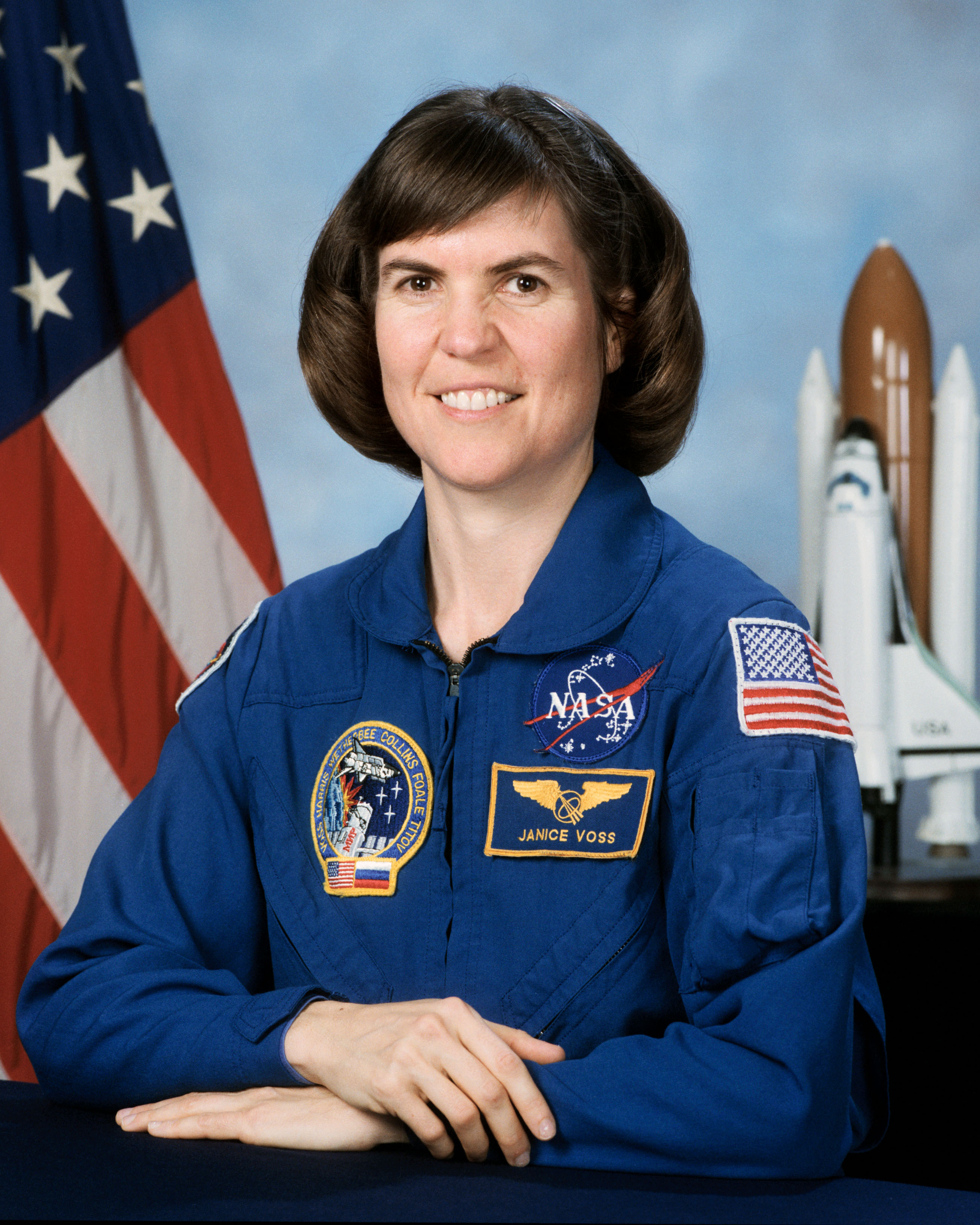
- Born: October 8, 1956; South Bend, Indiana, U.S.
- Died: February 6, 2012 (aged 55); Scottsdale, Arizona, U.S.
- Education: Purdue University (BS); Massachusetts Institute of Technology (MS, PhD); University of Oklahoma; Rice University
- Space career

NASA astronaut
- Time in space: 49d 3h 49m
- Selection: NASA Group 13 (1990)
- Missions: STS-57; STS-63; STS-83; STS-94; STS-99

Janice Elaine Voss (October 8, 1956 – February 6, 2012) was an American engineer and a NASA astronaut. Voss received her B.S. in engineering science from Purdue University, her M.S. in electrical engineering from MIT, and her PhD in aeronautics and astronautics from MIT. She flew in space five times, jointly holding the record for American women. Voss died in Arizona on February 6, 2012, from breast cancer.

== Education ==
Voss was born in South Bend, Indiana, in 1956 and grew up in Rockford, Illinois, where she received her kindergarten-6th grade education from Maud E. Johnson Elementary School and Guilford Center School. In 1972, Voss graduated from Minnechaug Regional High School in Wilbraham, Massachusetts. After high school, Voss went on to earn her Bachelor of Science in engineering science from Purdue University in 1975. During her time at Purdue, she was a member of Alpha Phi Omega. Voss continued her education at the Massachusetts Institute of Technology, earning her Master of Science degree in electrical engineering in 1977, completing her thesis on Kalman filtering techniques. From 1973 to 1975, Voss took correspondence courses at the University of Oklahoma. From 1977 to 1978, she completed work in space physics at Rice University. In 1983, Voss became a Draper Fellow while continuing her graduate studies in the Draper Laboratory at MIT. As a Draper Laboratory Fellow, she worked on developing software for the space shuttle program. Voss earned her Doctor of Philosophy in aeronautics and astronautics from the Massachusetts Institute of Technology in 1987. For her PhD work, Voss focused on developing algorithms to identify frequencies, damping, and mode shapes for the International Space Station.

== Inspiration ==
Voss has cited Madeleine L'Engle's 1962 novel A Wrinkle in Time as one of her primary inspirations for becoming an astronaut. The book tells the story of a young girl who must travel through time to save her father. In the book, the young girl's mother is a Nobel Prize winning biologist. Voss claims that the powerful female roles did not strike her as unusual, but were the norms she accepted in life. Voss flew a copy of A Wrinkle in Time onboard STS-94 and mailed it to Madeleine L'Engle.

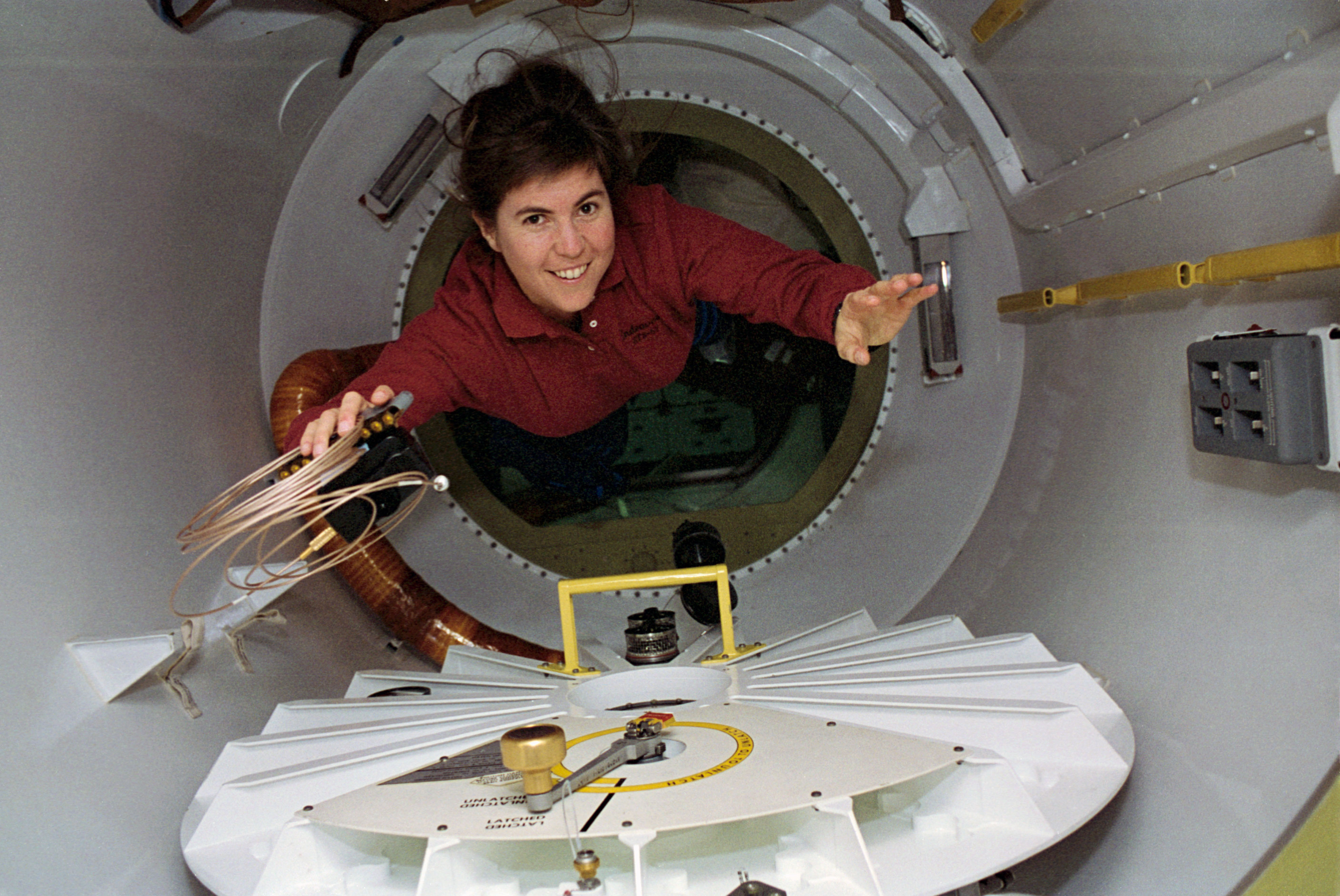
Voss, holding a camera, cable, and batteries, floats through the spacelab tunnel adapter on her way to the SPACEHAB module aboard Endeavour.

== Career ==
Voss first became involved with NASA in 1973 while she was still pursuing her bachelor's degree. She worked as co-op at the NASA Johnson Space Center until she graduated with her B.S. degree in 1975. During her time at Johnson Space Center she worked on Computer simulation in the Engineering and Development Directorate. She later returned to Johnson Space Center in 1977, and spent one year working as a crew trainer, teaching entry guidance and navigation. After completing her PhD in 1987 she began working at Orbital Sciences Corporation, where she worked on mission integration and flight operations to support for an upper stage called the Transfer Orbit Stage (TOS). In the Fall of 1992, TOS launched the Mars Observer from a Titan rocket and the Advanced Communications Technology Satellite in September 1993.

In 1990, Voss was selected by NASA as an astronaut candidate, and became an astronaut in 1991. She served as a mission specialist on missions STS-57 (1993), STS-63 (1995), STS-83 (1997), STS-94 (1997) and STS-99 (2000). During her career as an astronaut, her technical assignments included working Spacelab/Spacehab issues for the Astronaut Office Mission Development Branch, and robotics issues for the Robotics Branch. She participated in the first shuttle rendezvous with the Mir space station on STS-63, which flew around the station testing communications and in-flight maneuvers for later missions, but never actually docked. As an STS-99 crew member on the Shuttle Radar Topography Mission, she and her fellow crew members worked continuously in shifts to produce what was at the time the most accurate digital topographic map of the Earth. Voss logged over 49 days in space, traveled 18.8 million miles in 779 Earth orbits, and all of her missions included at least one other woman.

From October 2004 to November 2007, she was the Science Director for NASA's Kepler space telescope, a Sun-orbiting satellite designed to find Earth-like extrasolar planets in nearby planetary systems. It was launched in March 2009 and operated through October 2018. At the Astronaut Office Station Branch, she served as the Payloads Lead. She also worked for Orbital Sciences Corporation in flight operations support.

== Honors and dedication ==
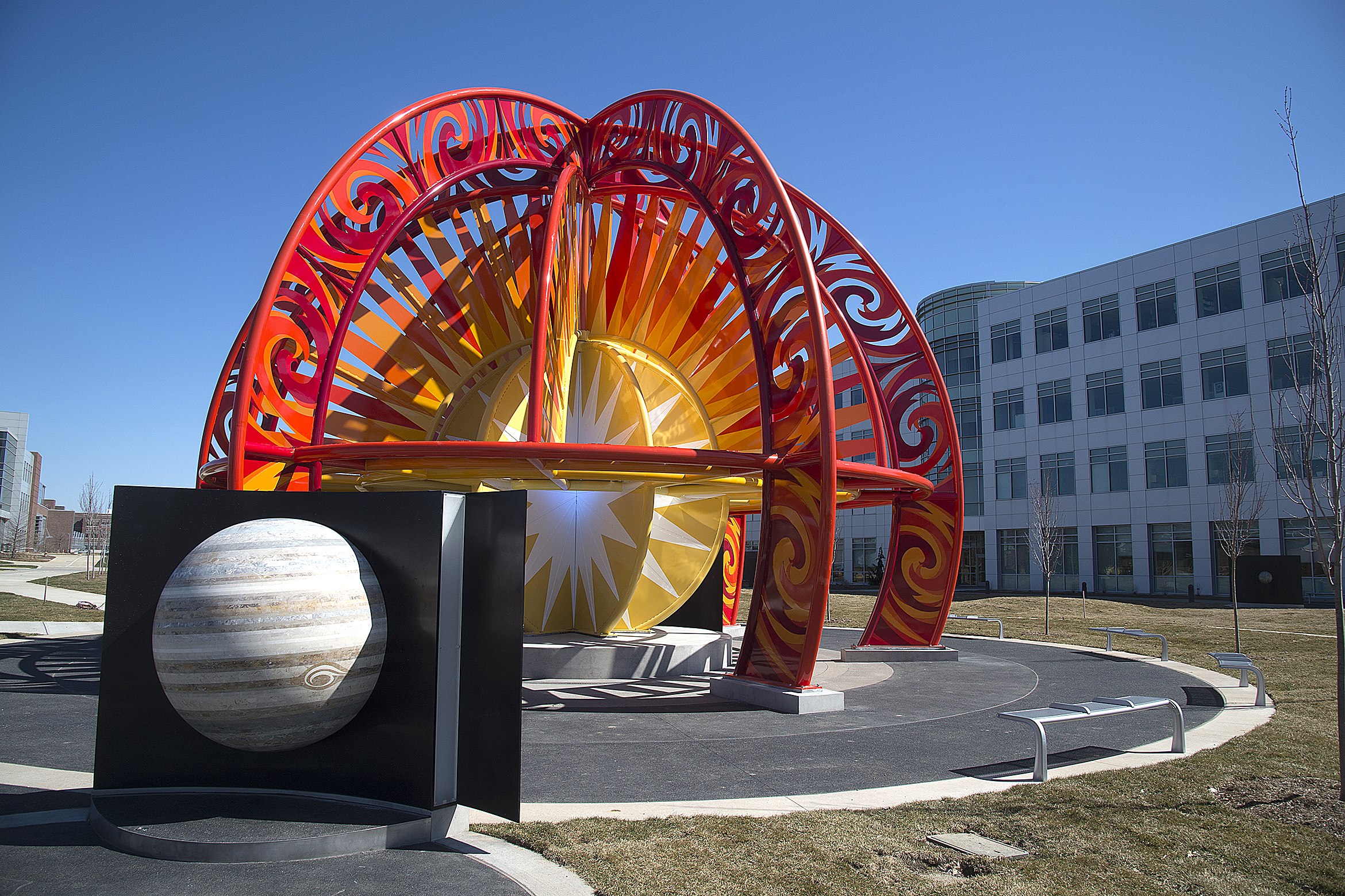
The cornerstone of the Visiting Our Solar System interactive exhibit in Discovery Park is the design of the Sun, which is 45 feet in diameter. Surrounding the VOSS Sun are the planets of the Solar System, set into a series of curved, 6-foot-high walls. Jeff Laramore and Tom Fansler of Smock Fansler Corp. of Indianapolis were the designers of the $1.5 million project. (Purdue University photo/Mark Simons)

Voss received several honors in her lifetime:

- National Science Foundation Fellowship; 1976
- Howard Hughes Fellowship; 1981
- Zonta Amelia Earhart Fellowship; 1982
- Draper Fellow; 1983
- NASA spaceflight medal; 1993, 1995

The Cygnus CRS Orb-2 spacecraft was named SS Janice Voss in her honor.

The VOSS Model is a scaled model of the Solar System, dedicated to Janice Voss, located at Purdue University's Discovery Park in West Lafayette, Indiana.
