= Janet L. Kavandi =

American astronaut (born 1959)

Janet Kavandi
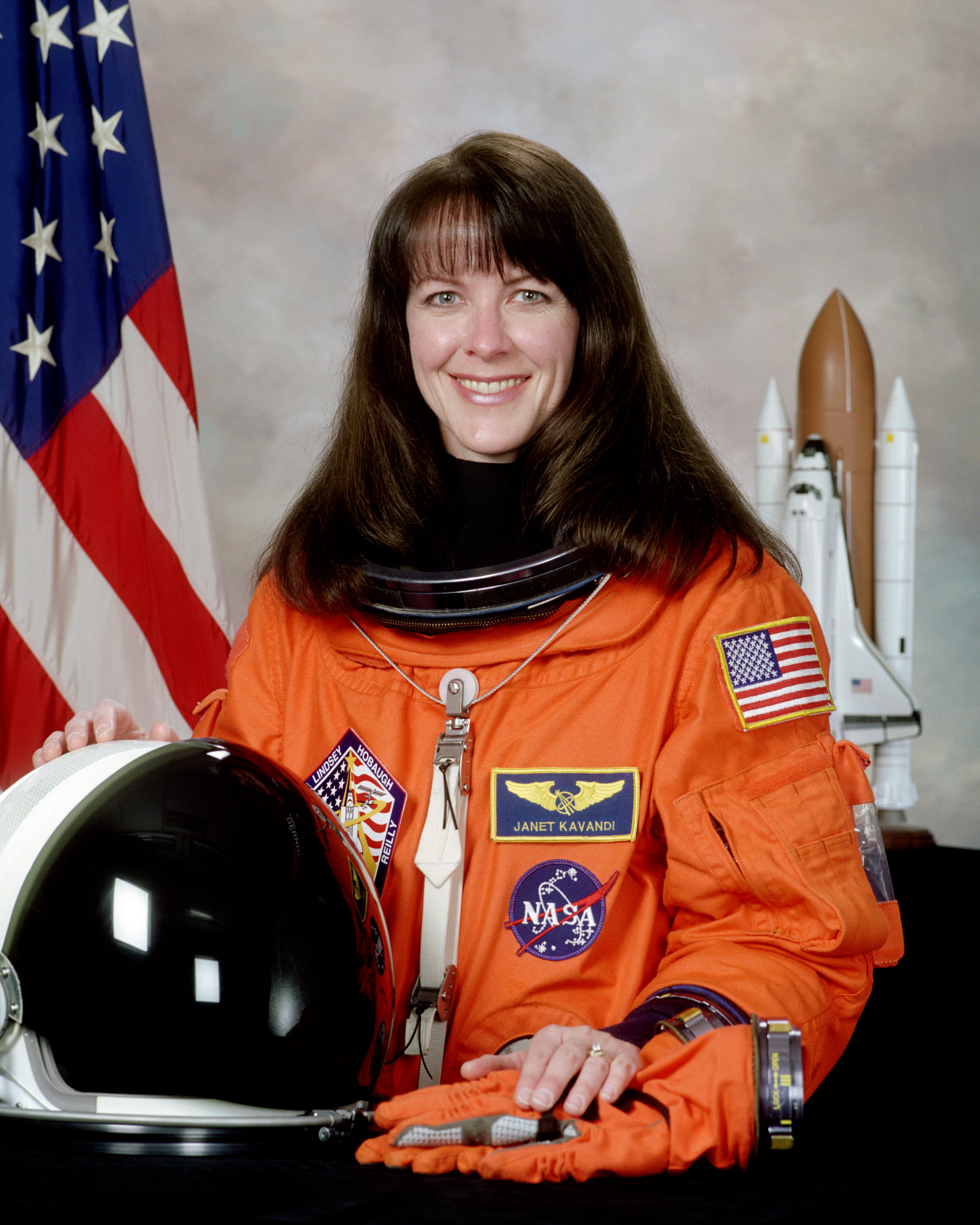
- Born: July 17, 1959 (age 67); Carthage, Missouri, U.S.
- Education: Missouri Southern State University (BS); Missouri University of Science and Technology (MS); University of Washington (PhD)
- Space career

NASA astronaut
- Time in space: 33d 20h 8m
- Selection: NASA Group 15 (1994)
- Missions: STS-91; STS-99; STS-104
- Scientific career
- Fields: Physics
- Thesis: Luminescene Imaging for Aerodynamic Pressure Measurements (1990)

Janet Lynn Kavandi (born July 17, 1959) is an American scientist and a NASA astronaut. She is a veteran of three Space Shuttle missions, served as NASA's deputy chief of the Astronaut Office, and was the center director at the NASA Glenn Research Center in Cleveland, Ohio, from March 2016 until her retirement from NASA in September 2019. She was inducted into the United States Astronaut Hall of Fame in 2019.

Kavandi is president of Sierra Space.

== Education ==
A native of Carthage, Missouri, Kavandi graduated valedictorian in 1977 from Carthage Senior High School. She went on to earn degrees in chemistry from Missouri Southern State College (bachelor's, 1980), the Missouri University of Science and Technology (masters, 1982), and the University of Washington (doctorate, 1990).

== Career ==
Following graduation in 1982, Kavandi accepted a position at Eagle-Picher Industries in Joplin, Missouri, as an engineer in new battery development for defense applications. In 1984, she accepted a position as an engineer in the Power Systems Technology Department of Boeing Defense, Space & Security in Seattle, Washington. She served as the lead engineer of secondary power for the Short Range Attack Missile II, and principal technical staff representative involved in the design and development of thermal batteries for Sea Lance and the Lightweight Exo-Atmospheric Projectile. Other programs she supported include Space Station, Lunar and Mars Base studies, Inertial Upper Stage, Advanced Orbital Transfer Vehicle, Getaway Specials, Air Launched Cruise Missile, Minuteman, and Peacekeeper. In 1986, while still working for Boeing, she was accepted into graduate school at the University of Washington, where she began working toward her doctorate in analytical chemistry. Her doctoral dissertation involved the development of a pressure-indicating coating that uses oxygen quenching of porphyrin photoluminescence to provide continuous surface pressure maps of aerodynamic test models in wind tunnels. Her work on pressure indicating paints has resulted in two patents.

== NASA career ==
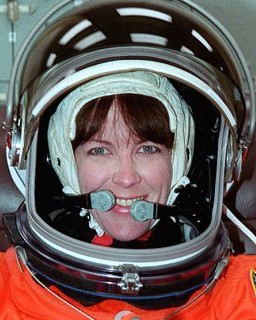

Kavandi was selected as an astronaut candidate by NASA in December 1994 and reported to the Johnson Space Center in March 1995. Following an initial year of training, she was assigned to the Payloads and Habitability Branch, where she supported payload integration for the International Space Station. Kavandi served as a mission specialist on STS-91 (June 2–12, 1998), the 9th and final Shuttle-Mir docking mission, concluding the joint U.S./Russian Phase 1 program. Following the mission, she worked as a CAPCOM (spacecraft communicator) in NASA's Mission Control Center. On her second mission, she served aboard STS-99 (February 11–22, 2000), the Shuttle Radar Topography Mission, which mapped more than 47 million miles of the Earth's land surface to provide data for a highly accurate three-dimensional topographical map.

Kavandi subsequently worked in the Robotics Branch, where she trained on both the shuttle and space station robotic manipulator systems. On her most recent mission, she served aboard STS-104/ISS Assembly Flight 7A (July 12–24, 2001) on the tenth mission to the International Space Station. The shuttle crew installed the joint airlock "Quest" and conducted joint operations with the Expedition 2 crew. Kavandi had trained in the Neutral Buoyancy Laboratory for spacewalking, but she did not take a spacewalk during STS-104.

Following her last mission, Kavandi again served as lead for the Payloads and Habitability Branch, then as the branch chief for the International Space Station (ISS). She was responsible for the training, operations, safety, and habitability of crews on board the ISS, as well as the hardware and software development and design reviews. She was also responsible for the scientific payloads that the ISS crews operate on-orbit and for coordination between international partners for visiting vehicles and associated operations. In 2005, Kavandi accepted a position as deputy chief of the Astronaut Office and served in that position until February 2008. Following that assignment, she became deputy director, flight crew operations, and then director, flight crew operations Johnson Space Center.

A three-flight veteran, Kavandi has logged over 33 days in space, traveling over 13.1 million miles in 535 Earth orbits.

In March 2016, Kavandi succeeded Jim Free as the center director at the NASA Glenn Research Center in Cleveland, Ohio.

In September 2019, she retired from NASA and started at Sierra Nevada Corporation.

== Awards and honors ==
- National Honor Society, 1977.
- Valedictorian of Carthage Senior High School, 1977.
- Presidential Scholarship from Missouri Southern State University, 1977.
- Graduated magna cum laude from Missouri Southern State University, 1980.
- Certificates for Team Excellence and Performance Excellence from Boeing Missile Systems, 1991.
- NASA Space Flight Medals
- NASA Exceptional Service Medals, 2001 and 2002.
- NASA Outstanding Leadership Medal, 2006.
- United States Astronaut Hall of Fame, 2019.
