= Houston Technology Center =

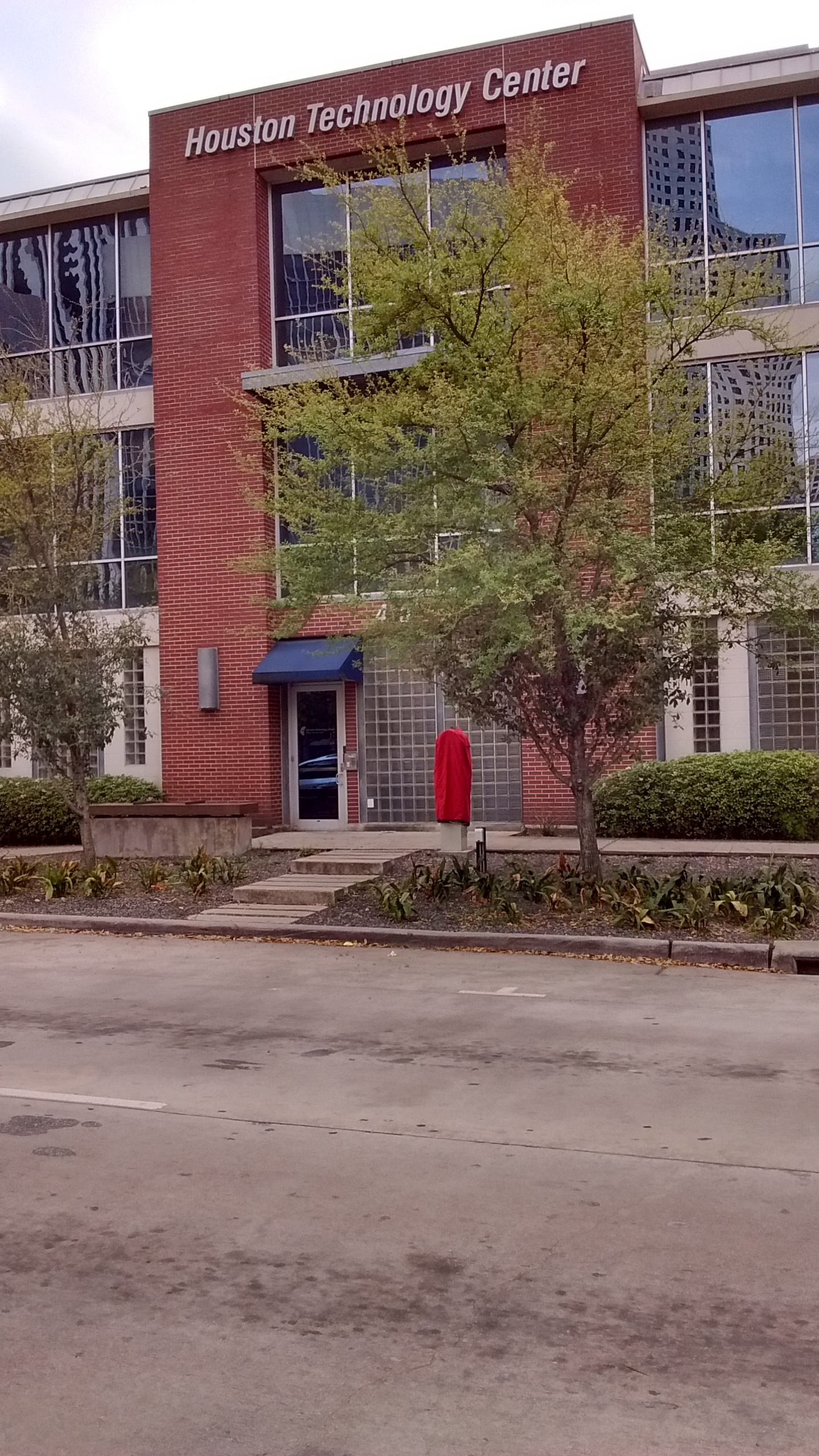
Entrance to the Houston Technology Center in Midtown

The Houston Technology Center (HTC) was a technology accelerator and incubator located in Midtown, Houston, Texas. The HTC was a business park focused on the sectors of energy, information technology (hardware and software), life sciences, and NASA based space technologies with coaching, capital, connections, community, and customers.

It was created in 1999 and lasted until 2018 when it was merged into the Houston Exponential program and shut down.

A similar program that is also located in Midtown opened in 2021, known as the Ion Innovation District.
