= Spacehab Research Double Module =

SPACEHAB-built laboratory flown on Space Shuttle Columbia

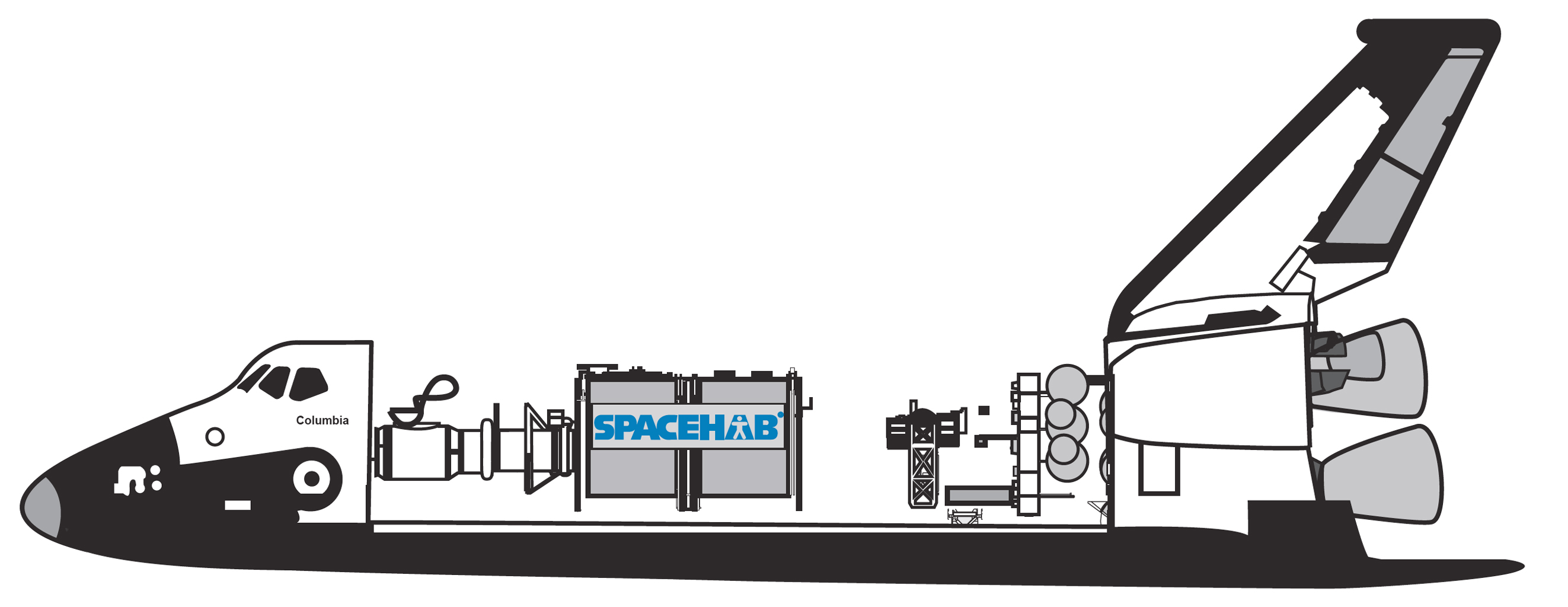
Spacehab Research Double Module (RDM) in the Space Shuttle.

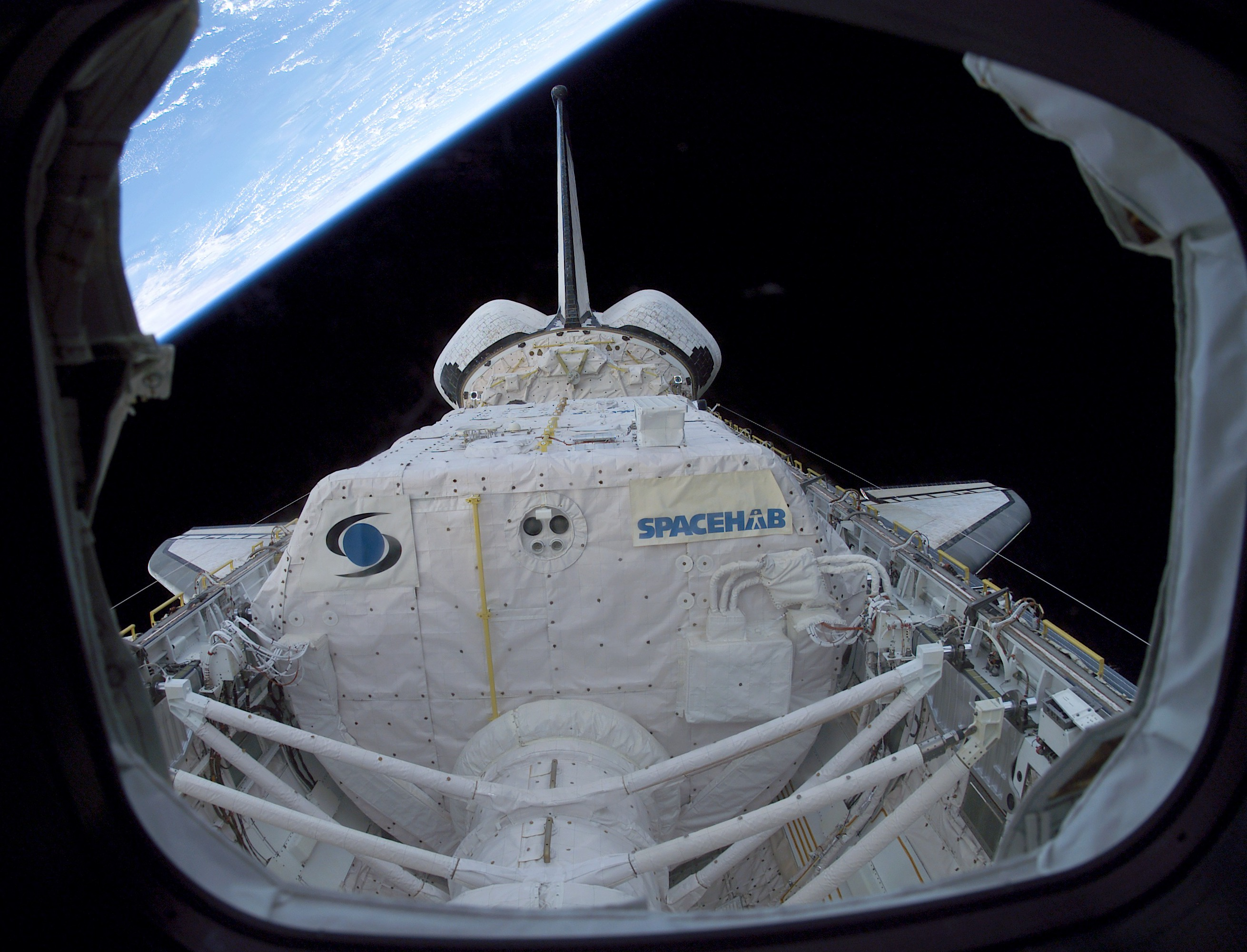
Spacehab Research Double Module on board STS-107.

The Research Double Module (RDM) was a payload module built by Spacehab Inc (now Astrotech Corporation) for the US Space Shuttle Orbiters. The module flew only on the ill-fated Space Shuttle Columbia STS-107 mission, in which it was destroyed.

== STS-107 ==
The inaugural flight of Spacehab's research double module, which launched January 2003 on STS-107, ended when the Space Shuttle Columbia broke up during re-entry. In February 2003 Spacehab received $17.7 million from its commercial insurance policy. In January 2004, Spacehab filed a formal claim against NASA for the amount of $87.7 million for the loss caused by the Columbia accident and in October 2004 NASA paid the company $8.2 million. In February 2007, Spacehab dropped all litigation against NASA.

== See also ==
- Other Spacehab hardware:
  - Integrated Cargo Carrier
  - External Stowage Platform
- Spacelab, European reusable laboratory flown in the Shuttle orbiter's cargo bay
