= STS-107 =

2003 failed flight of the Space Shuttle Columbia

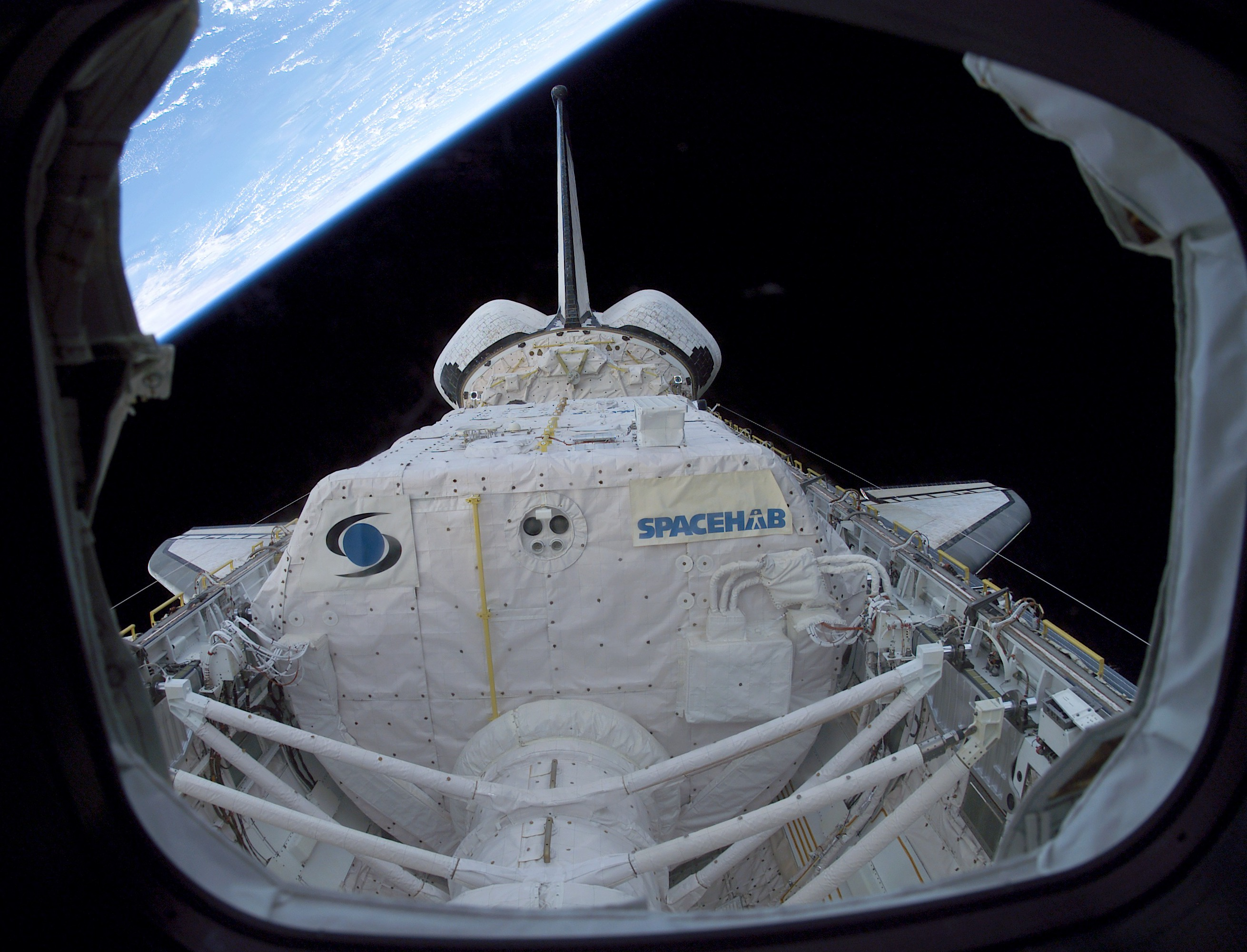
- Spacehab's Research Double Module in Columbia's payload bay during STS-107
- Names: Space Transportation System-107
- Mission type: Microgravity research
- Operator: NASA
- COSPAR ID: 2003-003A
- SATCAT no.: 27647
- Mission duration: 15 days, 22 hours, 20 minutes, 32 seconds
- Distance travelled: 10,600,000 kilometres (6,600,000 mi)
- Orbits completed: 255

Spacecraft properties
- Spacecraft: Space Shuttle Columbia
- Launch mass: 119,615 kilograms (263,706 lb)
- Landing mass: 105,593 kilograms (232,793 lb) (expected)
- Payload mass: 14,553 kilograms (32,084 lb)

Crew
- Crew size: 7
- Members: Rick D. Husband; William C. McCool; David M. Brown; Kalpana Chawla; Michael P. Anderson; Laurel Clark; Ilan Ramon

Start of mission
- Launch date: January 16, 2003 15:39:00 UTC
- Launch site: Kennedy, LC-39A

End of mission
- Decay date: February 1, 2003, 13:59:32 UTC; Disintegrated during reentry
- Landing site: Kennedy, SLF Runway 33 (planned)

Orbital parameters
- Reference system: Geocentric
- Regime: Low Earth
- Perigee altitude: 270 kilometres (170 mi)
- Apogee altitude: 285 kilometres (177 mi)
- Inclination: 39.0 degrees
- Period: 90.1 minutes
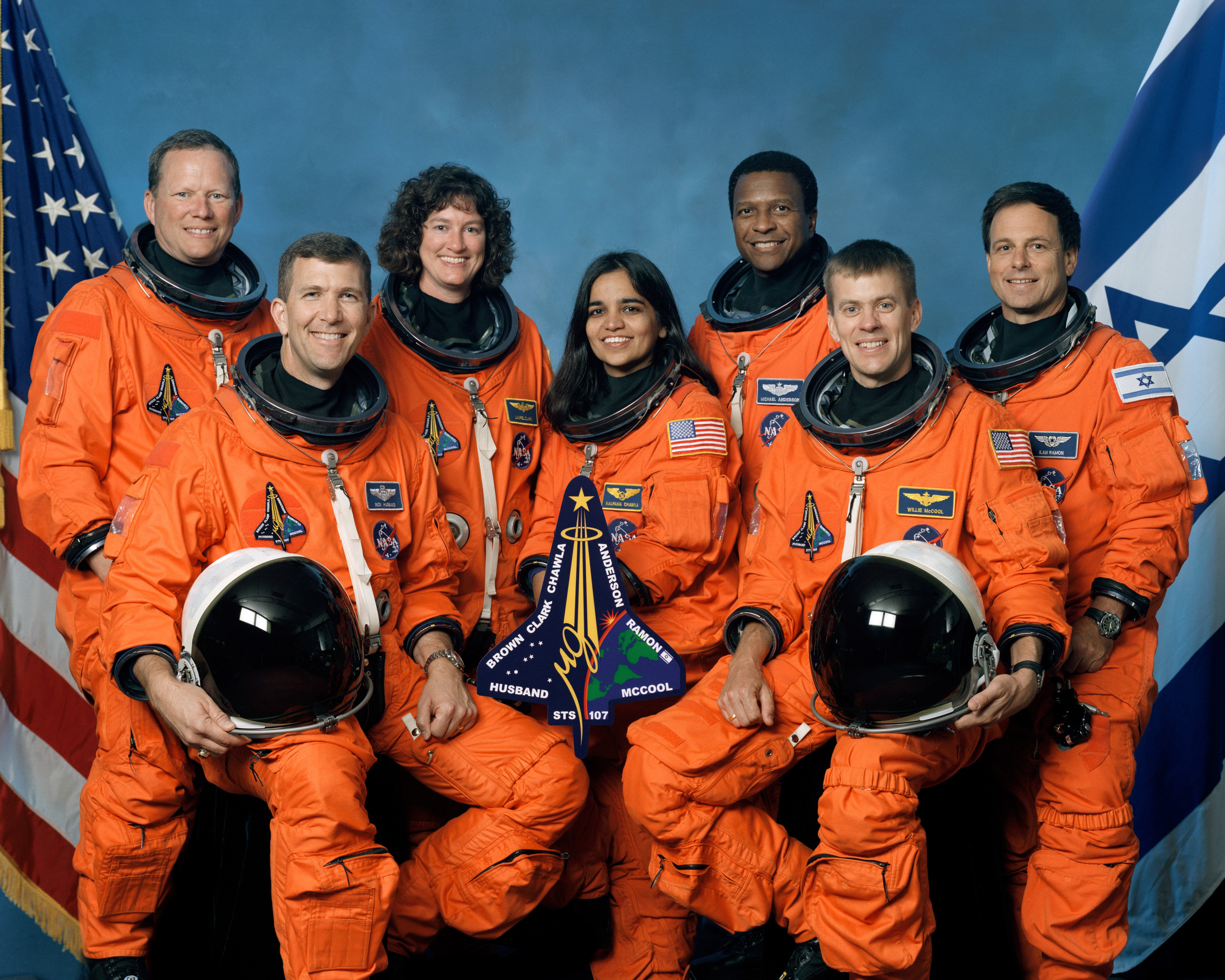
- STS-107 mission patch Rear (L-R): David Brown, Laurel Clark, Michael Anderson, Ilan Ramon; Front (L-R): Rick Husband, Kalpana Chawla, William McCool Space Shuttle program

STS-107 was the 113th flight of the Space Shuttle program, and the 28th and final flight of Space Shuttle Columbia. The mission ended on February 1, 2003, with the Space Shuttle Columbia disaster, in which all seven crew members were killed upon re-entry into the Earth's atmosphere; the shuttle was destroyed along with most of its scientific payloads.

The flight launched from Kennedy Space Center in Florida on January 16, 2003. It spent 15 days, 22 hours, 20 minutes, 32 seconds in orbit. The crew conducted a multitude of international scientific experiments. The disaster occurred during reentry while the orbiter was over Texas.

Immediately after the disaster, NASA convened the Columbia Accident Investigation Board to determine the cause of the disintegration. The source of the failure was determined to have been caused by a piece of foam that broke off during launch and damaged the thermal protection system (reinforced carbon-carbon panels and thermal protection tiles) on the leading edge of the orbiter's left wing. During re-entry the damaged wing slowly overheated and came apart, eventually leading to loss of control and disintegration of the vehicle. The cockpit window frame is now exhibited in a memorial inside the Space Shuttle Atlantis Pavilion at the Kennedy Space Center.

The damage to the thermal protection system on the wing was similar to that of Atlantis which had also sustained damage in 1988 during STS-27, the second mission after the Space Shuttle Challenger disaster. However, the damage on STS-27 occurred at a spot that had more robust metal (a thin steel plate near the landing gear), and that mission survived the re-entry.

== Crew ==
| Position | Astronaut |
|---|---|
| Commander | (United States) Rick Husband; Second and last spaceflight |
| Pilot | (United States) William C. McCool; Only spaceflight |
| Mission Specialist 1 | (United States) David M. Brown; Only spaceflight |
| Mission Specialist 2 Flight Engineer | (United States) / (India) Kalpana Chawla; Second and last spaceflight |
| Mission Specialist 3 | (United States) Michael P. Anderson; Second and last spaceflight |
| Mission Specialist 4 | (United States) Laurel Clark; Only spaceflight |
| Payload Specialist 1 | (Israel) Ilan Ramon, ISA; Only spaceflight |
Member of Blue Team; Member of Red Team

=== Crew seat assignments ===
| Seat | Launch | Landing | Seats 1–4 are on the flight deck. Seats 5–7 are on the mid-deck. |
| 1 | Husband | | Seats 1–4 are on the flight deck. Seats 5–7 are on the mid-deck. |
| 2 | McCool | | Seats 1–4 are on the flight deck. Seats 5–7 are on the mid-deck. |
| 3 | Brown | Clark | Seats 1–4 are on the flight deck. Seats 5–7 are on the mid-deck. |
| 4 | Chawla | | Seats 1–4 are on the flight deck. Seats 5–7 are on the mid-deck. |
| 5 | Anderson | | Seats 1–4 are on the flight deck. Seats 5–7 are on the mid-deck. |
| 6 | Clark | Brown | Seats 1–4 are on the flight deck. Seats 5–7 are on the mid-deck. |
| 7 | Ramon | | Seats 1–4 are on the flight deck. Seats 5–7 are on the mid-deck. |

== Mission highlights ==
STS-107 carried the SPACEHAB Research Double Module (RDM) on its inaugural flight, the Freestar experiment (also known as FREESTAR) (mounted on a Hitchhiker Program rack), and the Extended Duration Orbiter pallet. SPACEHAB was first flown on STS-57.

The primary mission focus was multidisciplinary microgravity research.

On the day of the experiment, a video taken to study atmospheric dust may have detected a new atmospheric phenomenon, dubbed a "TIGER" (Transient Ionospheric Glow Emission in Red).

On board Columbia was a copy of a drawing by Petr Ginz, the editor-in-chief of the magazine Vedem, who depicted what he imagined the Earth looked like from the Moon when he was a 14-year-old prisoner in the Terezín concentration camp. The copy was in the possession of Ilan Ramon and was lost in the disintegration. Ramon also traveled with a dollar bill received from the Lubavitcher Rebbe.

An Australian experiment, created by students from Glen Waverley Secondary College, was designed to test the reaction of zero gravity on the web formation of the Australian garden orb weaver spider.

=== Major experiments ===
STS-107 ignition, launch and lift-off of Columbia.

Examples of some of the experiments and investigations on the mission.

In SPACEHAB RDM:

- 9 commercial payloads with 21 investigations;
- 4 payloads for the European Space Agency with 14 investigations;
- 1 payload for ISS Risk Mitigation;
- 18 payloads NASA's Office of Biological and Physical Research (OBPR) with 23 investigations.

In the payload bay attached to RDM:

- Combined Two-Phase Loop Experiment (COM2PLEX);
- Miniature Satellite Threat Reporting System (MSTRS);
- Star Navigation (STARNAV).

FREESTAR

- Critical Viscosity of Xenon-2 (CVX-2);
- Space Experiment Module (SEM-14);
- Mediterranean Israeli Dust Experiment (MEIDEX)
- Low Power Transceiver (LPT) and Communications and Navigation Demonstration On Shuttle (CANDOS);
- Solar Constant Experiment-3 (SOLCON-3);
- Shuttle Ozone Limb Sounding Experiment (SOLSE-2);

Additional payloads

- Shuttle Ionospheric Modification with Pulsed Local Exhaust Experiment (SIMPLEX);
- Ram Burn Observation (RAMBO).

=== Results and data gained ===
Three experiments performed during the mission examined combustion, soot production, and fire quenching processes in microgravity, which provided new insights into combustion and fire suppression not able to be observed in Earth conditions. Other activities included a granular compression experiment which aided understanding of construction techniques, two separate experiments exploring the biological applications of cell cultures that could be used to combat prostate cancer or increase crop yield, as well as several other experiments that evaluated the commercial usefulness of plant products grown in space.

=== Data recovery ===
Because much of the data was transmitted during the mission, there was still large return on the mission objectives even though Columbia was lost on re-entry. NASA estimated that 30% of the total science data was saved and collected through telemetry back to ground stations. Around 5-10% more data was saved and collected through recovering samples and hard drives intact on the ground after the Space Shuttle Columbia disaster, increasing the total data of saved experiments despite the disaster from 30% to 35-40%.

About five or six Columbia payloads encompassing many experiments were successfully recovered in the debris field. Scientists and engineers were able to recover 99% of the data for one of the six FREESTAR experiments, Critical Viscosity of Xenon-2 (CVX-2), that flew unpressurized in the payload bay during the mission after recovering the viscometer and hard drive damaged but fully intact in the debris field in Texas. NASA recovered a commercial payload, Commercial Instrumentation Technology Associates (ITA) Biomedical Experiments-2 (CIBX-2), and ITA was able to increase the total data saved from STS-107 from 0% to 50% for this payload. This experiment studied treatments for cancer, and the micro-encapsulation experiment part of the payload was completely recovered, increasing from 0% data to 90% data after recovering the samples fully intact for this experiment. In this same payload were numerous crystal-forming experiments by hundreds of elementary and middle school students from all across the United States. Miraculously most of their experiments were found intact in CIBX-2, increasing from 0% data to 100% fully recovered data. The BRIC-14 (moss growth experiment) and BRIC-60 (Caenorhabditis elegans roundworm experiment) samples were found intact in the debris field within a 12-mile (19 km) radius in east Texas. 80-87% of these live organisms survived the catastrophe. The moss and roundworms experiments' original primary mission was not nominal due to the lack of having the samples immediately after landing in their original state (they were discovered many months after the crash), but these samples helped the scientific community greatly in the field of astrobiology and helped form new theories about microorganisms surviving a long trip in outer space while traveling on meteorites or asteroids.

=== Re-entry ===
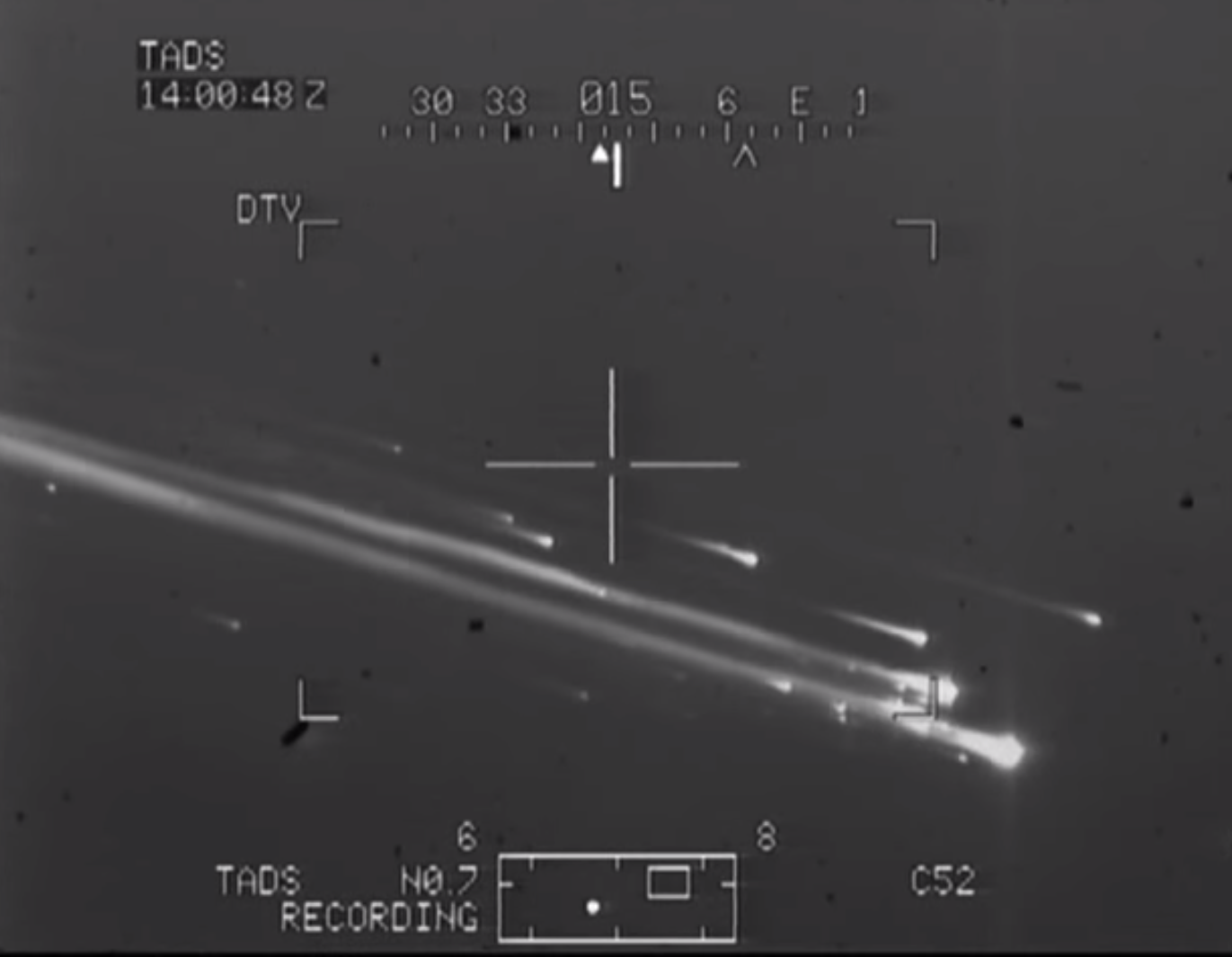
FLIR imaging photograph of Columbia's disintegration captured by an AH-64D Apache's FLIR camera during training with RNLAF (Royal Netherlands Air Force) personnel out of Fort Hood, Texas.

KSC landing was planned for Feb. 1 after a 16-day mission, but Columbia and crew were lost during re-entry over East Texas at about 9 a.m. EST, 16 minutes prior to the scheduled touchdown at KSC.

— NASA

Columbia began re-entry as planned, but the heat shield was compromised due to damage sustained during the ascent during which foam insulation from the external tank struck its left wing. The heat of re-entry was free to spread into the damaged portion of the orbiter, ultimately causing its disintegration and the death of all seven astronauts.

=== Aftermath ===
Upon realizing the tragedy, the Mission Control Center was locked and all of the data was saved for the coming investigation. Within 90 minutes a meeting was convened and the Columbia Accident Investigation Board (CAIB) was formed.

The accident triggered a seven-month investigation and a search for debris, and over 85,000 pieces were collected throughout the initial investigation. This amounted to roughly 38 percent of the orbiter vehicle.

The CAIB investigation confirmed the immediate cause of the accident as a foam strike to the leading edge of the shuttle's left wing during launch and criticized NASA for bad organizational and safety culture.

== Insignia ==
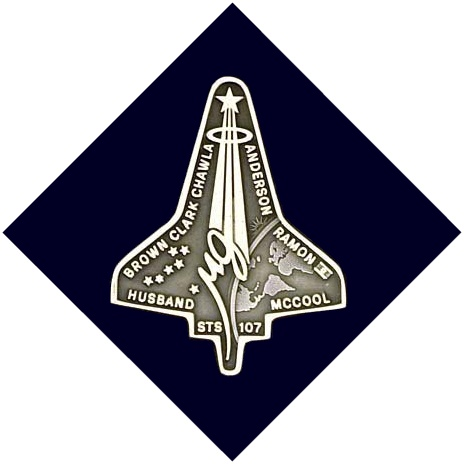
STS-107 Robbins Medallion

The mission insignia itself is the only patch of the shuttle program that is entirely shaped in the orbiter's outline. The central element of the patch is the microgravity symbol, μg, flowing into the rays of the astronaut symbol.

The mission inclination is portrayed by the 39-degree angle of the astronaut symbol to the Earth's horizon. The sunrise is representative of the numerous experiments that are the dawn of a new era for continued microgravity research on the International Space Station and beyond. The breadth of science and the exploration of space is illustrated by the Earth and stars. The constellation Columba (the dove) was chosen to symbolize peace on Earth and the Space Shuttle Columbia. The seven stars also represent the mission crew members and honor the original astronauts who paved the way to make research in space possible. Six stars have five points, the seventh has six points like a Star of David, symbolizing the Israeli Space Agency's contributions to the mission.

An Israeli flag is adjacent to the name of Payload Specialist Ramon, who was the first Israeli in space. The crew insignia or 'patch' design was initiated by crew members Dr. Laurel Clark and Dr. Kalpana Chawla. First-time crew member Clark provided most of the design concepts as Chawla led the design of her maiden voyage STS-87 insignia. Clark also pointed out that the dove in the Columba constellation was mythologically connected to the explorers the Argonauts who released the dove.

== Wake-up calls ==
Throughout the shuttle program, sleeping astronauts were often awakened each morning by songs and short pieces of music chosen by their families, friends, and Mission Control, a tradition dating back to the Gemini and Apollo programs. While the crew of STS-107 worked shifts in "red" and "blue" teams to work around the clock, on this mission each shift was still awoken with a "wake-up call"; the only other two-shift shuttle mission to do so was STS-99.

| Day | Team | Song | Artist/Performer | Played for | Link |
|---|---|---|---|---|---|
| 2 | Blue | "E'mma" | Touré Kunda | David Brown | WAV |
| 2 | Red | "America, the Beautiful" | Texas Elementary Honors Choir (Note: With Rick Husband's daughter Laura.) | Rick Husband | WAV |
| 3 | Blue | "Coming Back to Life" | Pink Floyd | William McCool | WAV |
| 3 | Red | "Space Truckin'" | Deep Purple | Kalpana Chawla | WAV |
| 4 | Blue | "Cultural Exchange" | Not listed | David Brown | WAV |
| 4 | Red | "Hatishma Koli" (התשמע קולי) | The High Windows | Ilan Ramon | WAV |
| 5 | Blue | "Fake Plastic Trees" | Radiohead | William McCool | WAV |
| 5 | Red | "Amazing Grace" | Black Watch and 51st Highland Brigade Band | Laurel Clark | WAV |
| 6 | Blue | "Texan 60" | Not listed | David Brown | WAV |
| 6 | Red | "God of Wonders" | Steve Green | Rick Husband | WAV |
| 7 | Blue | "The Wedding Song" | Paul Stookey | William McCool | WAV |
| 7 | Red | "Prabhati" | Ravi Shankar | Kalpana Chawla | WAV |
| 8 | Blue | "Hakuna Matata" | The Baha Men | Michael Anderson | WAV |
| 8 | Red | "Ma ata oseh kesheata kam baboker? (מה אתה עושה כשאתה קם בבוקר?)" | Arik Einstein | Ilan Ramon | WAV |
| 9 | Blue | "Burning Down The House" | Talking Heads | To honor combustion experiments | WAV |
| 9 | Red | "Kung Fu Fighting" | Carl Douglas | Whole crew | WAV |
| 10 | Blue | "Hotel California" | The Eagles / McCool Family (Note: With Sean McCool on guitar, his then-girlfriend Josee as vocals, and her father Frank also on guitar.) | William McCool | WAV |
| 10 | Red | "The Prayer" | Celine Dion | Rick Husband | WAV |
| 11 | Blue | "I Say a Little Prayer" | Dionne Warwick | Michael Anderson | WAV |
| 11 | Red | "Drops of Jupiter" | Train | Kalpana Chawla | WAV |
| 12 | Blue | "When Day Is Done" | Django Reinhardt and Stephane Grappelli | David Brown | WAV |
| 12 | Red | "Love of My Life" | Queen | Ilan Ramon | WAV |
| 13 | Blue | "Slow Boat to Rio" | Earl Klugh | Michael Anderson | WAV |
| 13 | Red | "Running to the Light" | Runrig | Laurel Clark | WAV |
| 14 | Blue | "I Get Around" | The Beach Boys | David Brown | WAV |
| 14 | Red | "Up On the Roof" | James Taylor | Rick Husband | WAV |
| 15 | Blue | "Imagine" | John Lennon | William McCool | WAV |
| 15 | Red | "Yaar ko hamne ja ba ja dekha" (यार को हमने जा ब जा देखा) | Abita Parveen | Kalpana Chawla | WAV |
| 16 | Blue | "Silver Inches" | Enya | David Brown | WAV |
| 16 | Red | "Shalom lach eretz nehederet" (שלום לך ארץ נהדרת) (Note: In the tune of Arlo Guthrie's "City of New Orleans".) | Yehoram Gaon | Ilan Ramon | WAV |
| 17 | Blue | "If You've Been Delivered" | Kirk Franklin | Michael Anderson | WAV |
| 17 | Red | "Scotland the Brave" | The Black Watch and 51st Highland Brigade Band | Laurel Clark | WAV |

== Gallery ==
Launch video.

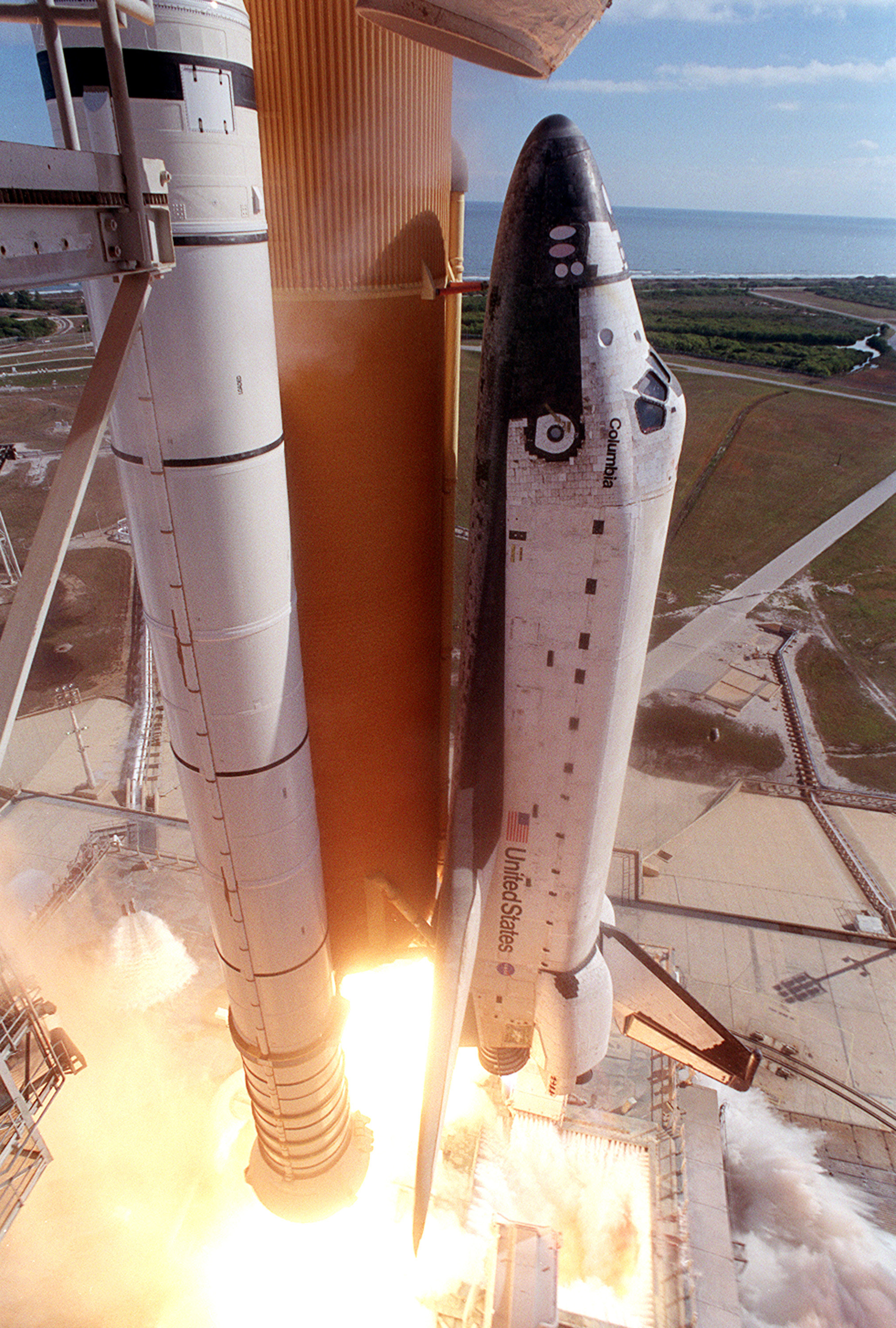
Launch of STS-107 from Launch Pad 39A at Kennedy Space Center.

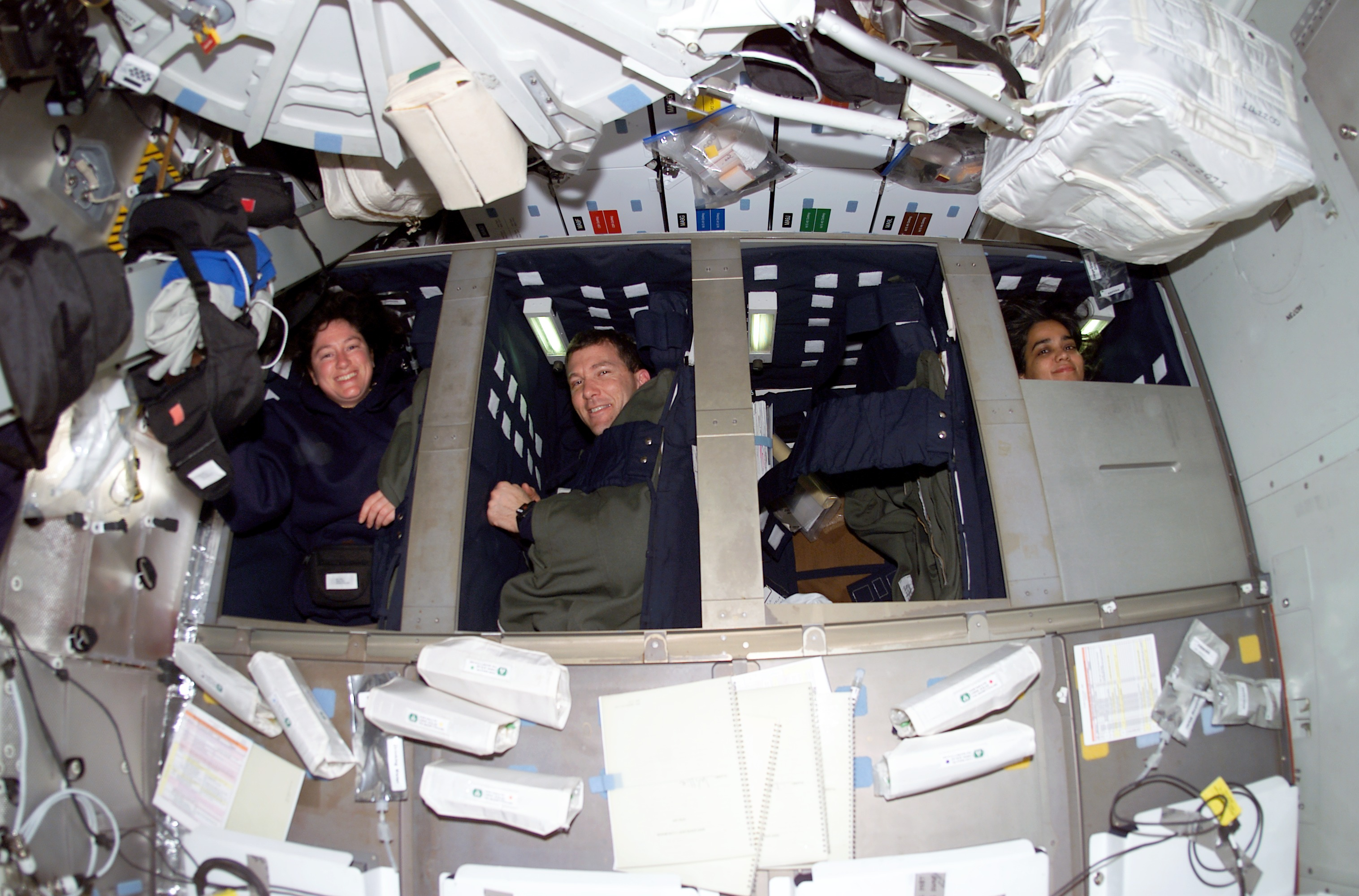
Mission STS-107 crew in bunk beds on the middeck of the Space Shuttle.

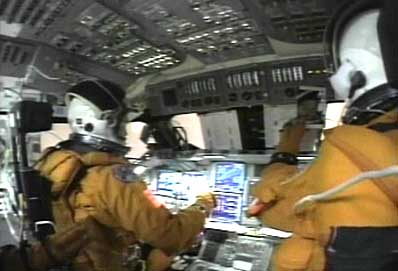
Reentry video frame.

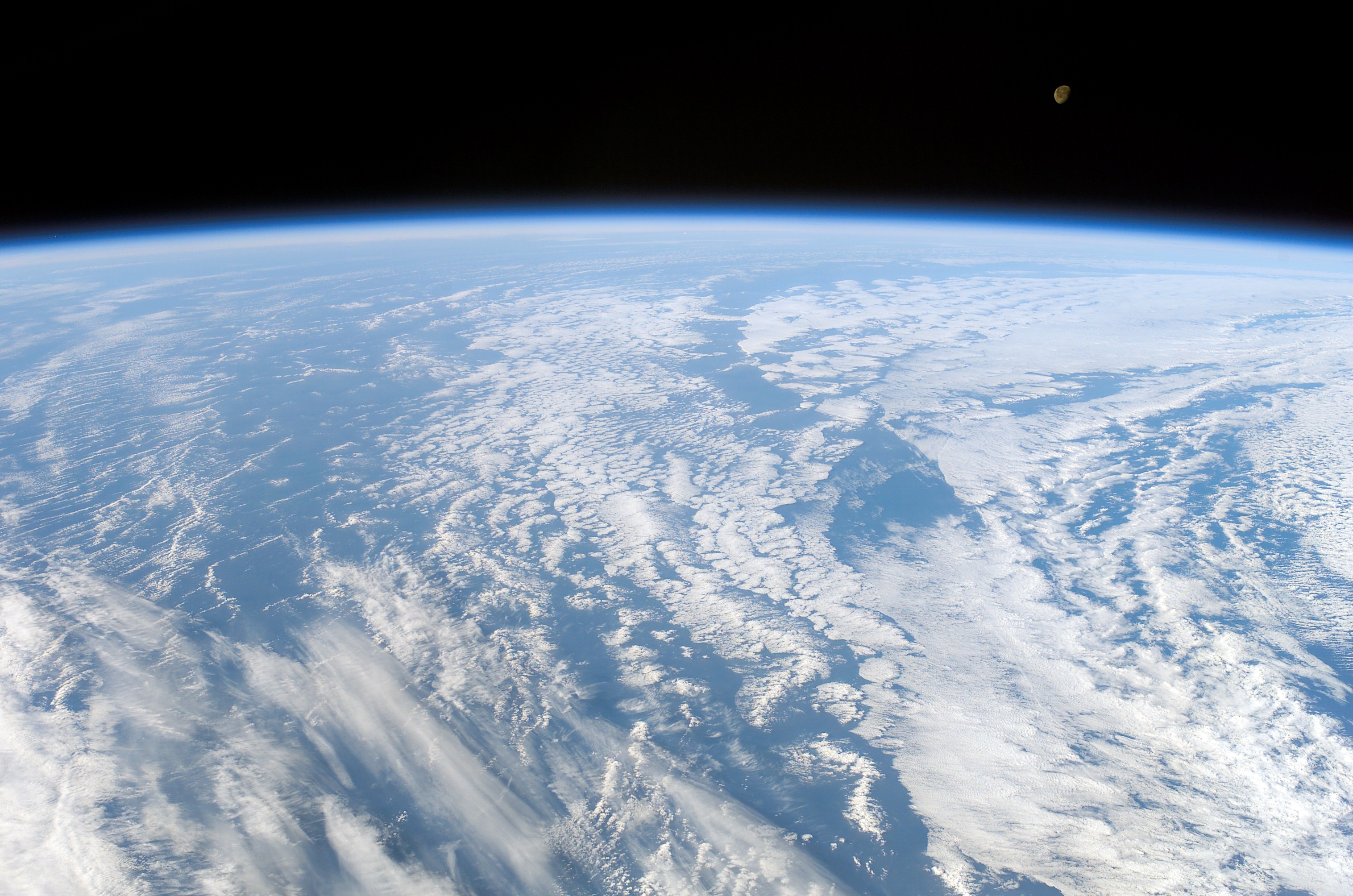
View of the atmosphere and of the Moon.

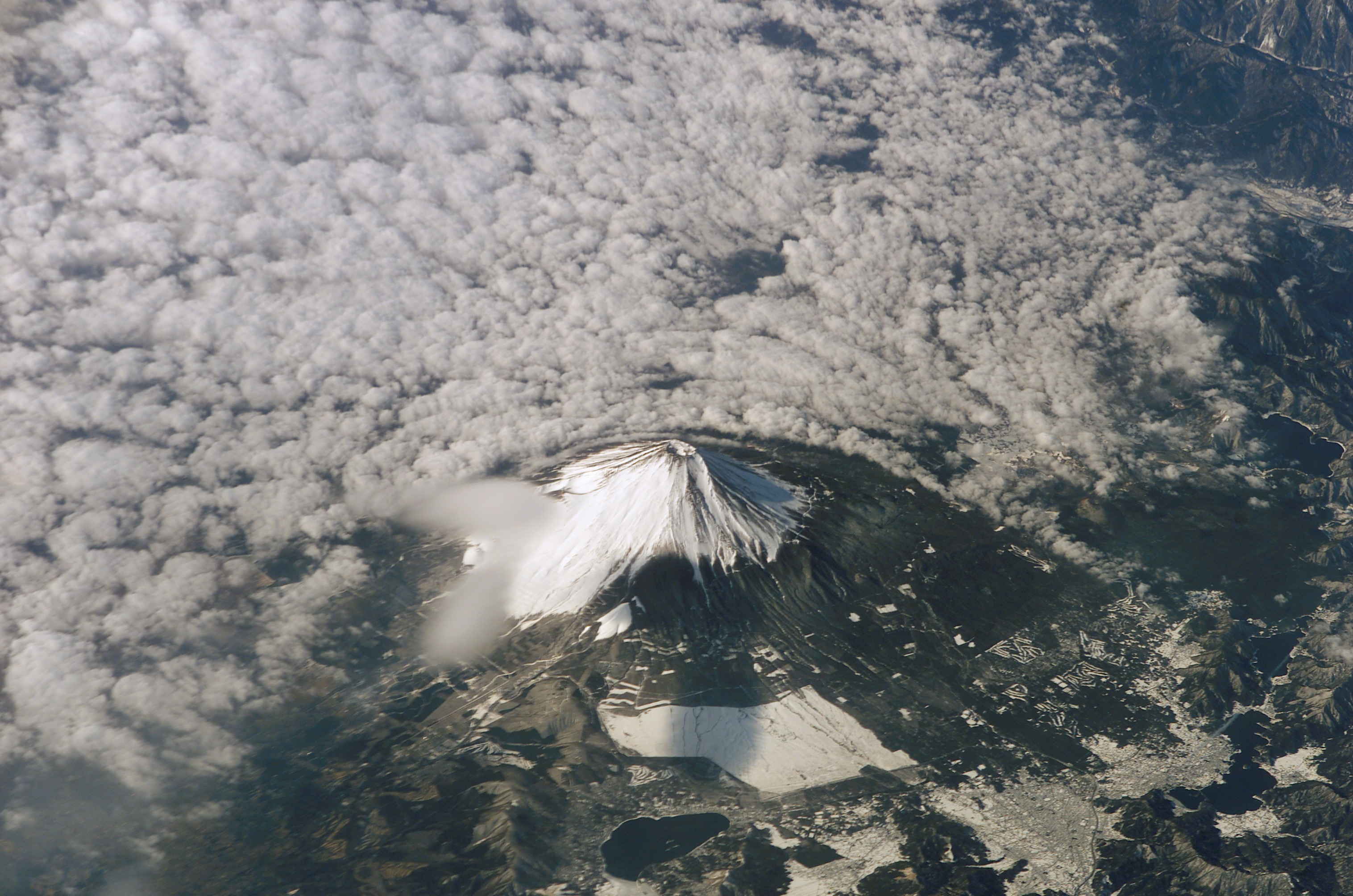
A view of Mount Fuji and the surrounding area from Columbia

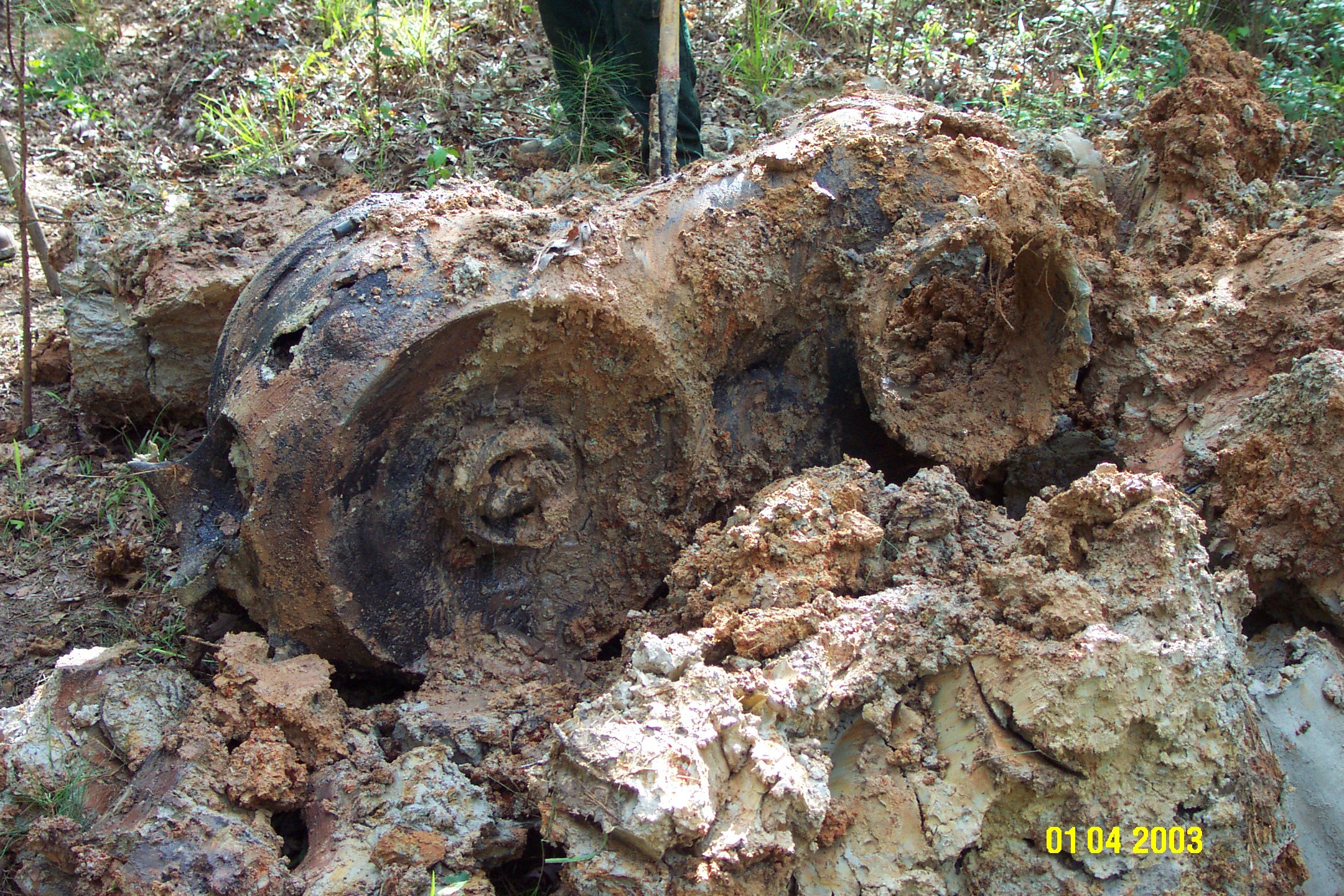
Part of one of Columbia's main engines later recovered.

== See also ==
- Apollo 1
- List of Space Shuttle missions
- Space Shuttle Challenger disaster
  - STS-51-L, Challenger's disastrous mission
- Outline of space science

== Literature ==
- Starbuck, William H.; Farjoun, Moshe, eds. (2005). Organization at the Limit: Lessons from the Columbia Disaster. Malden: Blackwell. ISBN 140513108X.
