= Space Shuttle Columbia =

Space Shuttle orbiter (1981–2003)

Columbia
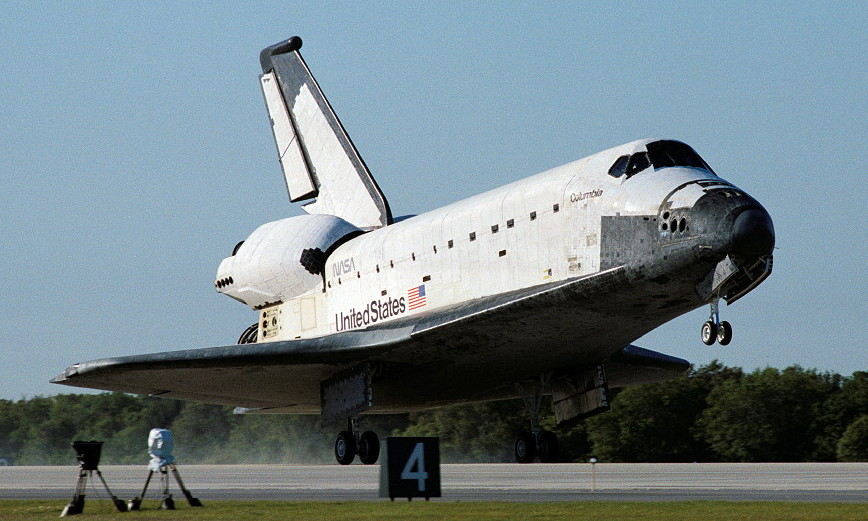
- Columbia landing at Kennedy on March 18, 1994, at the conclusion of STS-62
- Type: Spaceplane
- Class: Space Shuttle orbiter
- Eponym: Columbia Rediviva; Apollo CSM Columbia
- Serial no.: OV-102
- Owner: NASA
- Manufacturer: Rockwell International

Specifications
- Dry mass: 81,600 kg (179,900 lb)
- Rocket: Space Shuttle

History
- First flight: April 12–14, 1981; STS-1
- Last flight: January 16 – February 1, 2003; STS-107
- Flights: 28
- Flight time: 7,218 hours
- Traveled: 201,497,772 km (125,204,911 mi) around Earth
- Orbits: 4,808 around Earth
- Fate: Disintegrated during re-entry

Space Shuttle orbiters

Space Shuttle Columbia (OV-102) was a Space Shuttle orbiter manufactured by Rockwell International and operated by NASA. Named after the first American ship to circumnavigate the globe, and the female personification of the United States, Columbia was the first of five Space Shuttle orbiters to fly in space, debuting the Space Shuttle launch vehicle on its maiden flight on April 12, 1981 and becoming the first spacecraft to be re-used after its first flight when it launched on STS-2 on November 12, 1981. As only the second full-scale orbiter to be manufactured after the Approach and Landing Test vehicle Enterprise, Columbia retained unique external and internal features compared with later orbiters, such as test instrumentation and distinctive black chines. In addition to a heavier aft fuselage and the retention of an internal airlock throughout its lifetime, these made Columbia the heaviest of the five spacefaring orbiters: around 1,000 kilograms (2,200 pounds) heavier than Challenger and 3,600 kilograms (7,900 pounds) heavier than Endeavour when originally constructed. Columbia also carried ejection seats based on those from the SR-71 during its first six flights until 1983, and from 1986 onwards carried an imaging pod on its vertical stabilizer.

During its 22 years of operation, Columbia was flown on 28 missions in the Space Shuttle program, spending over 300 days in space and completing over 4,000 orbits around Earth. NASA's flagship orbiter, Columbia often flew flights dedicated to scientific research in orbit following the loss of Challenger in 1986. Columbia was used for eleven of the fifteen flights of Spacelab laboratories, all four United States Microgravity Payload missions, and the only flight of Spacehab's Research Double Module. Columbia flew many of the longest duration space shuttle missions, all dedicated to scientific research. The only space shuttle that could rival Columbia's long missions was Endeavour, which flew the STS-67 mission that lasted for nearly 17 days. In 1992, NASA modified Columbia to be able to fly some of the longest missions in the Shuttle Program history using the Extended Duration Orbiter pallet. The orbiter used the pallet in thirteen of the pallet's fourteen flights, which aided lengthy stays in orbit for scientific and technological research missions. The longest duration flight of the Shuttle Program, STS-80, was flown with Columbia in 1996, at over 17 days in orbit. Columbia was also used to deploy the first ever satellites into orbit by the Shuttle on STS-5, retrieve the Long Duration Exposure Facility and deploy the Chandra observatory, which was the heaviest payload ever carried by the Space Shuttle. Columbia also carried into space the first female commander of an American spaceflight mission, the first ESA astronaut, the first female astronaut of Indian origin, and the first Israeli astronaut.

At the end of its final flight in February 2003, Columbia disintegrated upon reentry, killing the seven-member crew of STS-107 and destroying most of the scientific payloads aboard. The Columbia Accident Investigation Board convened shortly afterwards concluded that damage sustained to the orbiter's left wing during the launch of STS-107 fatally compromised the vehicle's thermal protection system. The loss of Columbia and its crew led to a refocusing of NASA's human exploration programs and led to the establishment of the Constellation program in 2005 and the eventual retirement of the Space Shuttle program in 2011. Numerous memorials and dedications were made to honor the crew following the disaster; the Columbia Memorial Space Center was opened as a national memorial for the accident, and the Columbia Hills in Mars' Gusev crater, which the Spirit rover explored, were named after the crew. The majority of Columbia's recovered remains are stored at the Kennedy Space Center's Vehicle Assembly Building, though some pieces are on public display at the nearby Visitor Complex.

== History ==
Platform to the Stars: Space Shuttle (1980) Official NASA Space Shuttle program information film reel.

Construction began on Columbia in 1975 at Rockwell International's (formerly North American Aviation/North American Rockwell) principal assembly facility in Palmdale, California, a suburb of Los Angeles. Columbia was named after the American sloop Columbia Rediviva which, from 1787 to 1793, under the command of Captain Robert Gray, explored the US Pacific Northwest and became the first American vessel to circumnavigate the globe. It is also named after the command module of Apollo 11, the first crewed landing on another celestial body. Columbia was also the female symbol of the United States. After construction, the orbiter arrived at Kennedy Space Center on March 25, 1979, to prepare for its first launch. Columbia was originally scheduled to lift off in late 1979, however the launch date was delayed by problems with both the RS-25 engine and the thermal protection system (TPS). On March 19, 1981, during preparations for a ground test, workers were asphyxiated in Columbia's nitrogen-purged aft engine compartment, resulting in (variously reported) two or three fatalities.

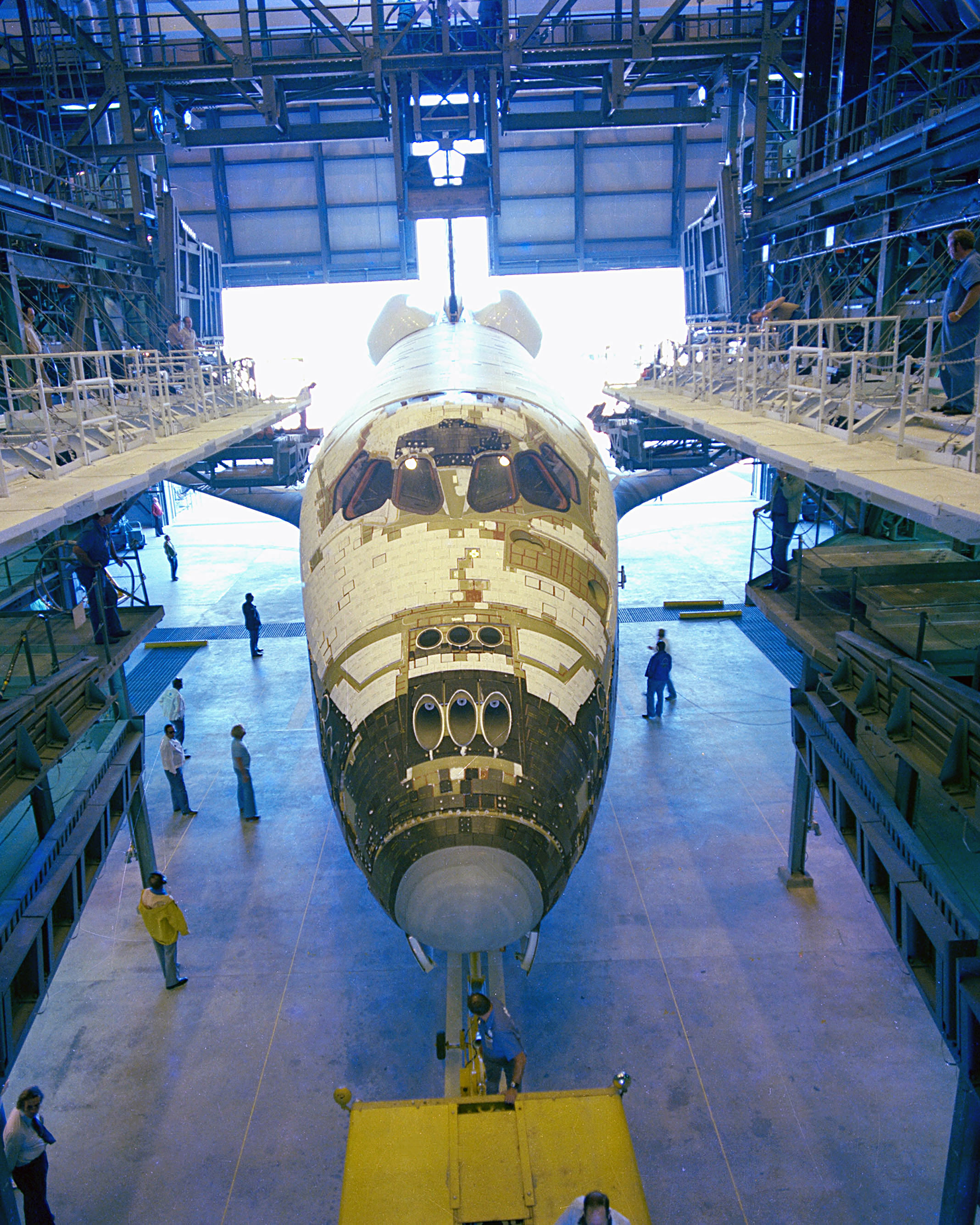
Columbia in the Orbiter Processing Facility after delivery to Kennedy Space Center in 1979. About 8,000 of 30,000 tiles had not yet been installed.

The first flight of Columbia (STS-1) was commanded by John Young, a veteran from the Gemini and Apollo programs who in 1972 had been the ninth person to walk on the Moon; and piloted by Robert Crippen, a rookie astronaut originally selected to fly on the military's Manned Orbital Laboratory (MOL) spacecraft, but transferred to NASA after its cancellation, and served as a support crew member for the Skylab and Apollo-Soyuz missions.

Columbia spent 610 days in the Orbiter Processing Facility (OPF), another 35 days in the Vehicle Assembly Building (VAB), and 105 days on Pad 39A before finally lifting off. It was successfully launched on April 12, 1981, the 20th anniversary of the first human spaceflight (Vostok 1), and returned on April 14, 1981, after orbiting the Earth 36 times, landing on the dry lakebed runway at Edwards Air Force Base in California. It then undertook three further research missions to test its technical characteristics and performance. Its first operational mission, with a four-man crew, was STS-5, which launched on November 11, 1982. At this point Columbia was joined by Challenger, which flew the next three shuttle missions, while Columbia underwent modifications for the first Spacelab mission.

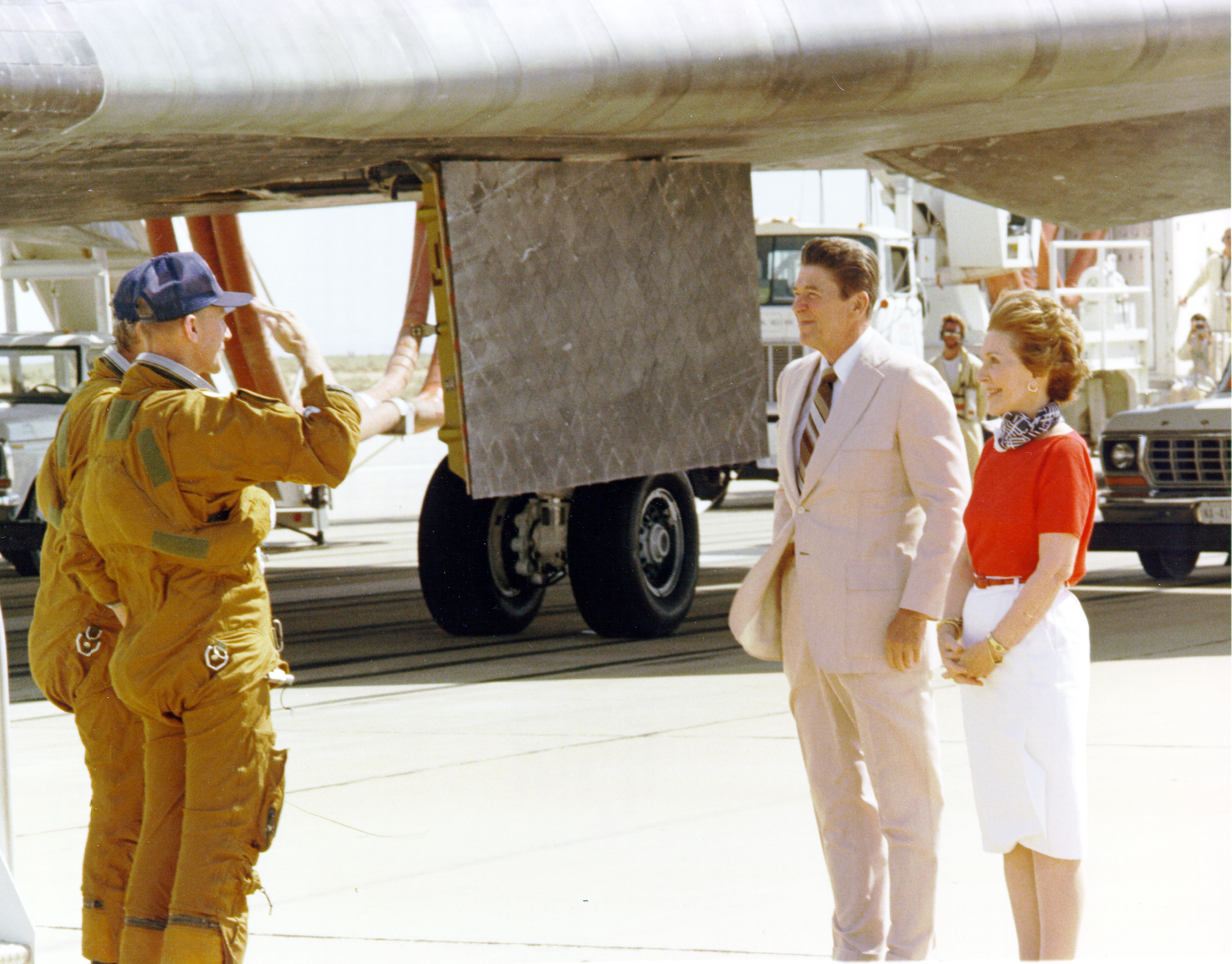
Columbia astronauts Thomas K. Mattingly and pilot Henry Hartsfield salute President Ronald Reagan, standing beside his wife, Nancy, upon landing in 1982

In 1983, Columbia, under the command of John Young on what was his sixth spaceflight, undertook its second operational mission (STS-9), in which the Spacelab science laboratory and a six-person crew was carried, including the first non-American astronaut on a space shuttle, Ulf Merbold. After the flight, it spent 18 months at the Rockwell Palmdale facility beginning in January 1984, undergoing modifications that removed the Orbiter Flight Test hardware and updating it to similar specifications as those of its sister orbiters. At that time the shuttle fleet was expanded to include Discovery and Atlantis.

Columbia returned to space on January 12, 1986, with the launch of STS-61-C. The mission's crew included Franklin Chang-Diaz, and the first sitting member of the House of Representatives to venture into space, Bill Nelson.

The next shuttle mission, STS-51-L, was undertaken by Challenger. It was launched on January 28, 1986, ten days after STS-61-C had landed, and ended in disaster 73 seconds after launch. Prior to the accident, Columbia had been slated to be ferried to Vandenberg Air Force Base to conduct fueling tests and to perform a flight readiness firing at SLC-6 to validate the west coast launch site. In the aftermath, NASA's shuttle timetable was disrupted, and the Vandenberg tests, which would have cost $60 million, were canceled. Columbia was not flown again until 1989 (on STS-28), after which it resumed normal service as part of the shuttle fleet.

STS-93, launched on July 23, 1999, was the first U.S. space mission with a female commander, Lt. Col. Eileen Collins. This mission deployed the Chandra X-ray Observatory.

Columbia's final complete mission was STS-109, the fourth servicing mission for the Hubble Space Telescope. Its next mission, STS-107, culminated in the orbiter's loss when it disintegrated during reentry, killing all seven of its crew.

Consequently, President George W. Bush decided to retire the Shuttle orbiter fleet by 2010 in favor of the Constellation program and its crewed Orion spacecraft. The Constellation program was later canceled with the NASA Authorization Act of 2010 signed by President Barack Obama on October 11.

=== Construction milestones ===
Date	Milestone
July 26, 1972	Contract Awarded to North American Rockwell
March 25, 1975	Start long-lead fabrication aft fuselage
November 17, 1975	Start long-lead fabrication of crew module
June 28, 1976	Start assembly of crew module
September 13, 1976	Start structural assembly of aft fuselage
December 13, 1977	Start assembly upper forward fuselage
January 3, 1977	Start assembly vertical stabilizer
August 26, 1977	Wings arrive at Palmdale from Grumman
October 28, 1977	Lower forward fuselage on dock, Palmdale
November 7, 1977	Start of Final Assembly
February 24, 1978	Body flap on dock, Palmdale
April 28, 1978	Forward payload bay doors on dock, Palmdale
May 26, 1978	Upper forward fuselage mate
July 7, 1978	Complete mate forward and aft payload bay doors
September 11, 1978	Complete forward RCS
February 3, 1979	Complete combined systems test, Palmdale
February 16, 1979	Airlock on dock, Palmdale
March 5, 1979	Complete postcheckout
March 8, 1979	Closeout inspection, Final Acceptance Palmdale
March 8, 1979	Rollout from Palmdale to Dryden
March 12, 1979	Overland transport from Palmdale to Edwards
March 20, 1979	SCA Ferry Flight from DFRC to Biggs AFB, Texas
March 22, 1979	SCA Ferry flight from Biggs AFB to Kelly AFB, Texas
March 24, 1979	SCA Ferry flight from Kelly AFB to Eglin AFB, Florida
March 24, 1979	SCA Ferry flight from Eglin, AFB to KSC
November 3, 1979	Auxiliary Power Unit hot fire tests, OPF KSC
December 16, 1979	Orbiter integrated test start, KSC
January 14, 1980	Orbiter integrated test complete, KSC
February 20, 1981	Flight Readiness Firing
April 12, 1981	First Flight (STS-1)

== First operational orbiter ==
=== Weight ===
As the second orbiter to be constructed and the first able to fly into space, Columbia was roughly 8,000 lb (3,600 kg) heavier than subsequent orbiters such as Endeavour when she was first constructed, which had benefited from advances in materials technology. In part, this was due to heavier wing and fuselage spars, the weight of early test instrumentation that remained fitted to the avionics suite, and an internal airlock that, originally fitted into the other orbiters, was later removed in favor of an external airlock to facilitate Shuttle/Mir and Shuttle/International Space Station dockings..Columbia was not modified for the planned Centaur-G booster (canceled after the loss of Challenger). The retention of the internal airlock allowed NASA to use Columbia for the STS-109 Hubble Space Telescope servicing mission, along with the Spacehab double module used on STS-107. Due to Columbia's higher weight, it was less ideal for NASA to use it for missions to the International Space Station due to the performance decreases needed to carry the heavy payloads to the high inclination orbit, though modifications were made to the Shuttle during its last refit in case the spacecraft was needed for such tasks.

=== Thermal protection system ===
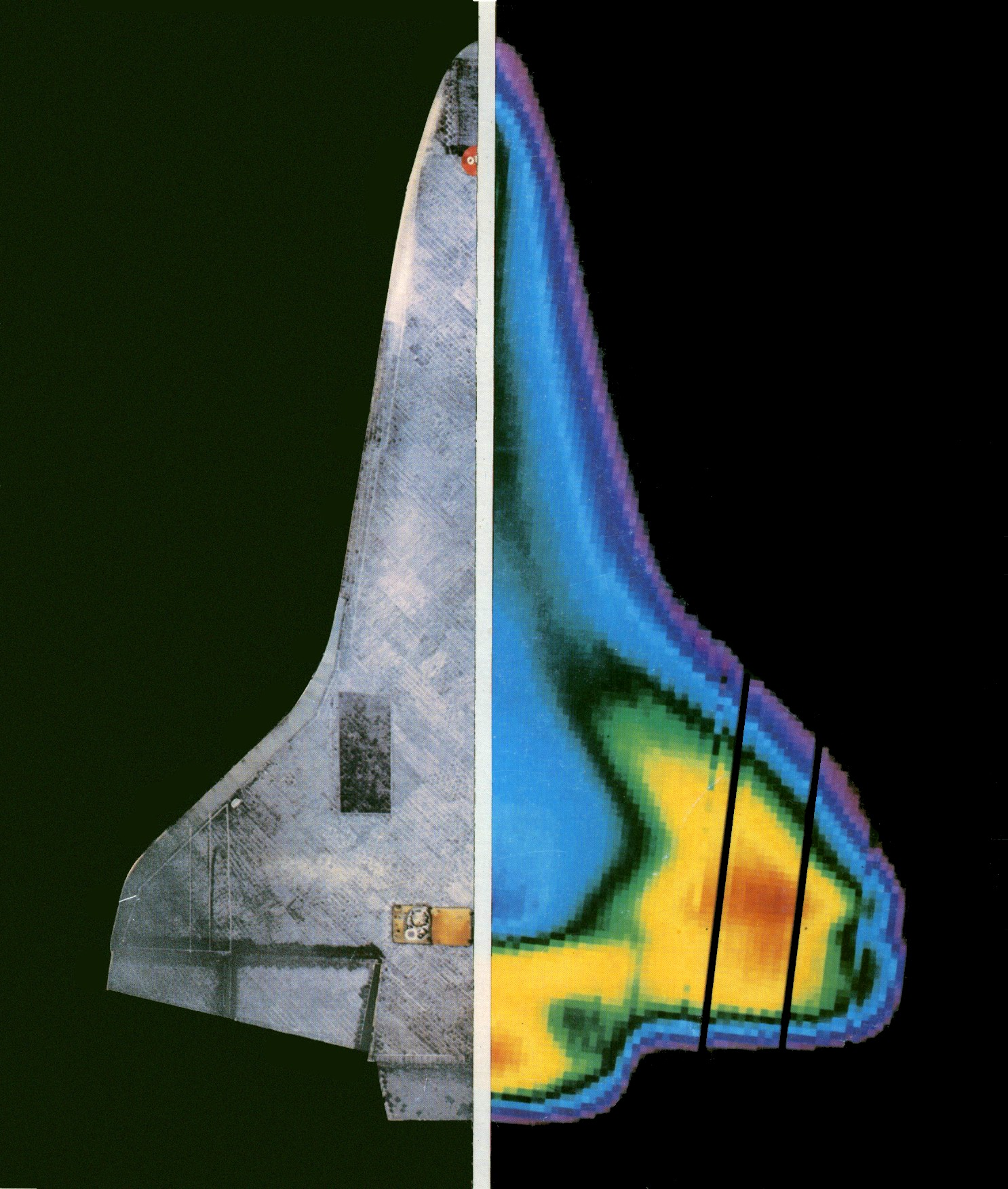
The Space Shuttle thermal protection system in the underside of Columbia as seen in a visible (left side) and infrared (right side) image which was taken by the Kuiper Airborne Observatory on STS-3

Externally, Columbia was the first orbiter in the fleet whose surface was mostly covered with High & Low Temperature Reusable Surface Insulation (HRSI/LRSI) tiles as its main thermal protection system (TPS), with white silicone rubber-painted Nomex – known as Felt Reusable Surface Insulation (FRSI) blankets – in some areas on the wings, fuselage, and payload bay doors. FRSI once covered almost 25% of the orbiter; the first upgrade resulted in its removal from many areas, and in later flights, it was only used on the upper section of the payload bay doors and inboard sections of the upper wing surfaces. The upgrade also involved replacing many of the white LRSI tiles on the upper surfaces with Advanced Flexible Reusable Surface Insulation (AFRSI) blankets (also known as Fibrous Insulation Blankets, or FIBs) that had been used on Discovery and Atlantis.

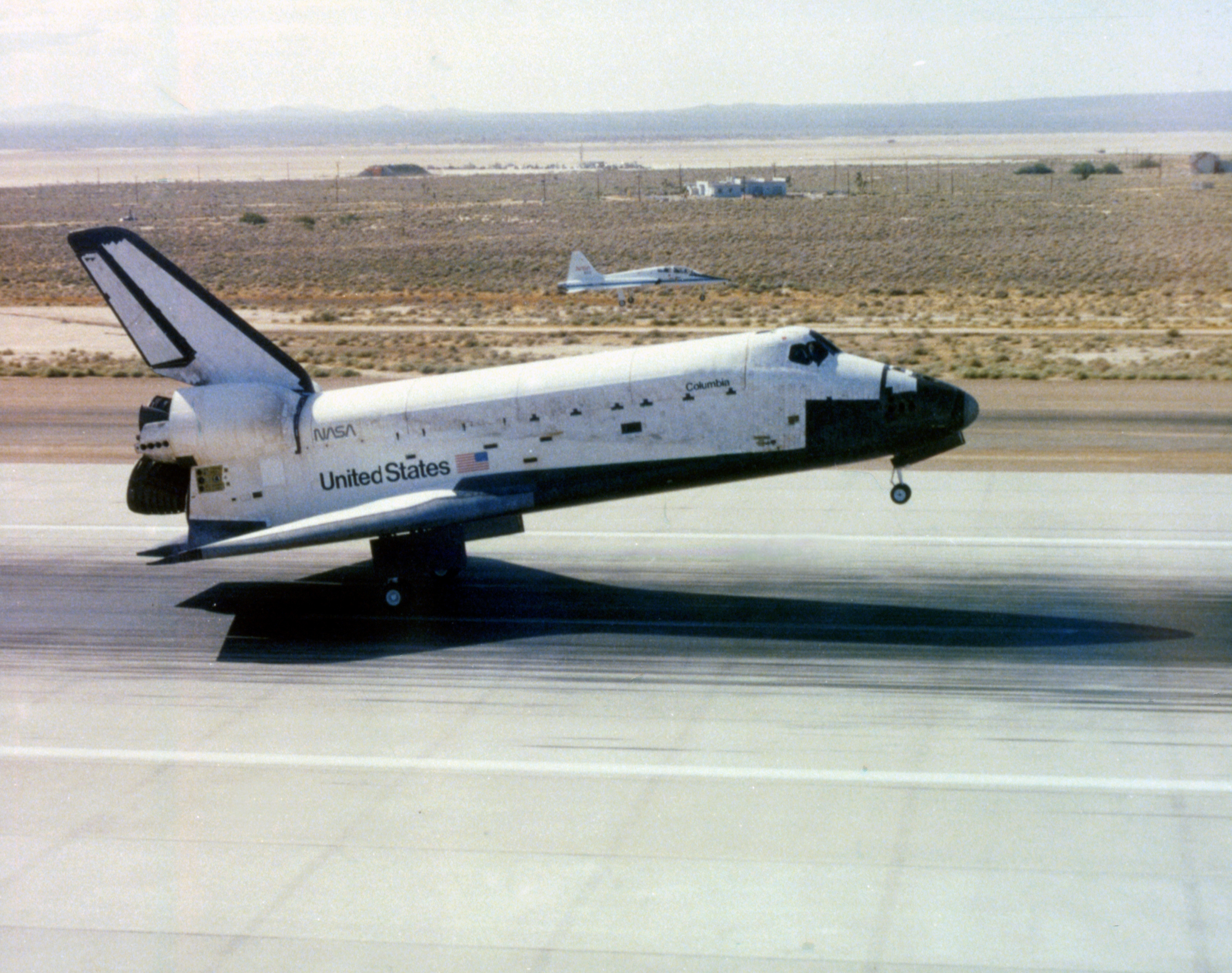
Columbia landing on July 4, 1982, concluding STS-4, accompanied by a T-38 Talon flying in formation.

Originally, Columbia had 32,000 tiles – the upgrade reduced this to 24,300. The AFRSI blankets consisted of layers of pure silica felt sandwiched between a layer of silica fabric on the outside and S-Glass fabric on the inside, stitched together using pure silica thread in a 1-inch grid, then coated with a high-purity silica coating. The blankets were semi-rigid and could be made as large as 30" by 30". Each blanket replaced as many as 25 tiles and was bonded directly to the orbiter. The direct application of the blankets to the orbiter resulted in weight reduction, improved durability, reduced fabrication, and installation cost, and reduced installation schedule time. All of this work was performed during Columbia's first retrofitting and the post-Challenger stand-down.

Though the orbiter's thermal protection system and other enhancements had been refined, Columbia would never weigh as little unloaded as the other orbiters in the fleet. The next-oldest shuttle, Challenger, was also relatively heavy, although 2,200 lb (1,000 kg) lighter than Columbia.

=== Markings and insignia ===
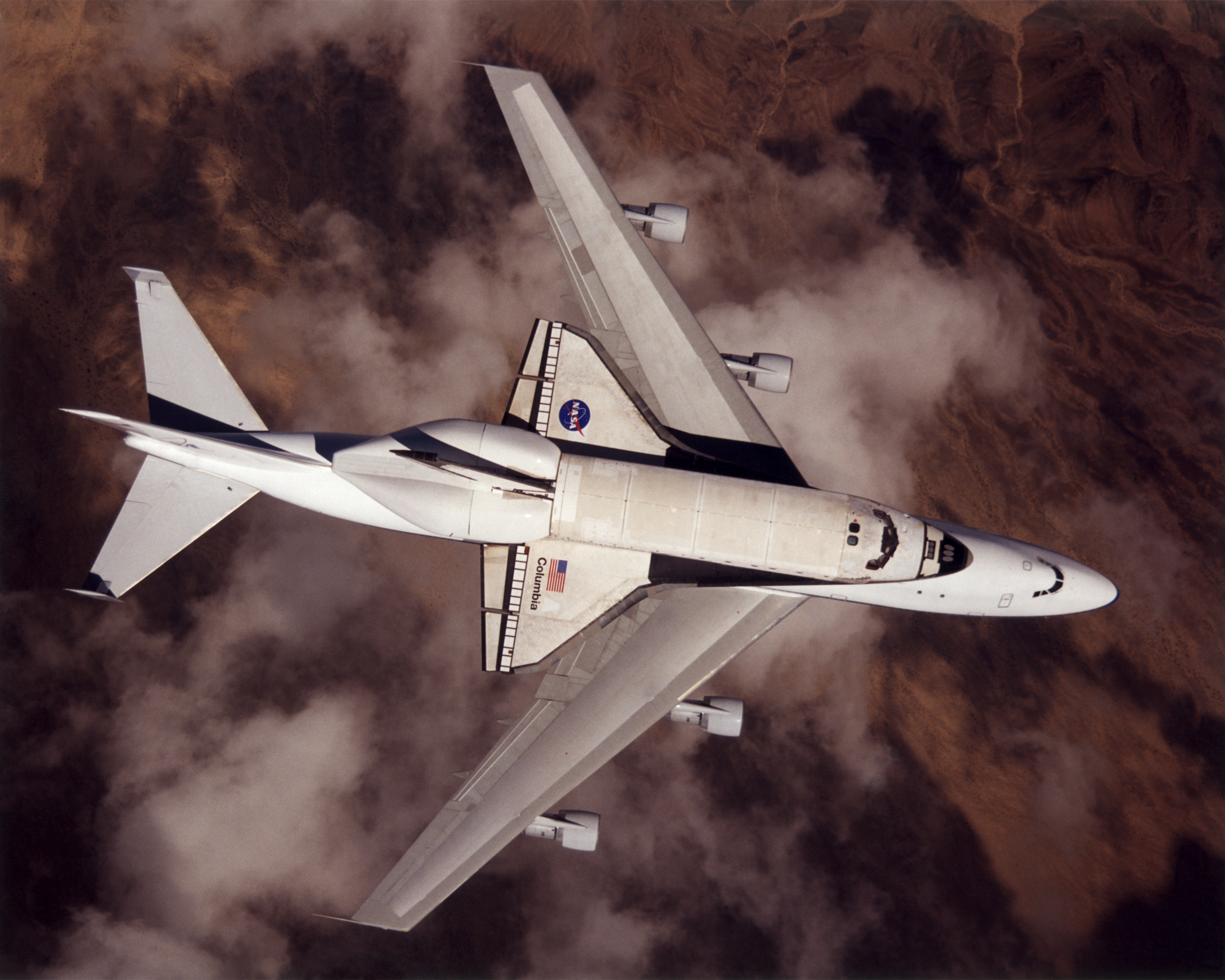

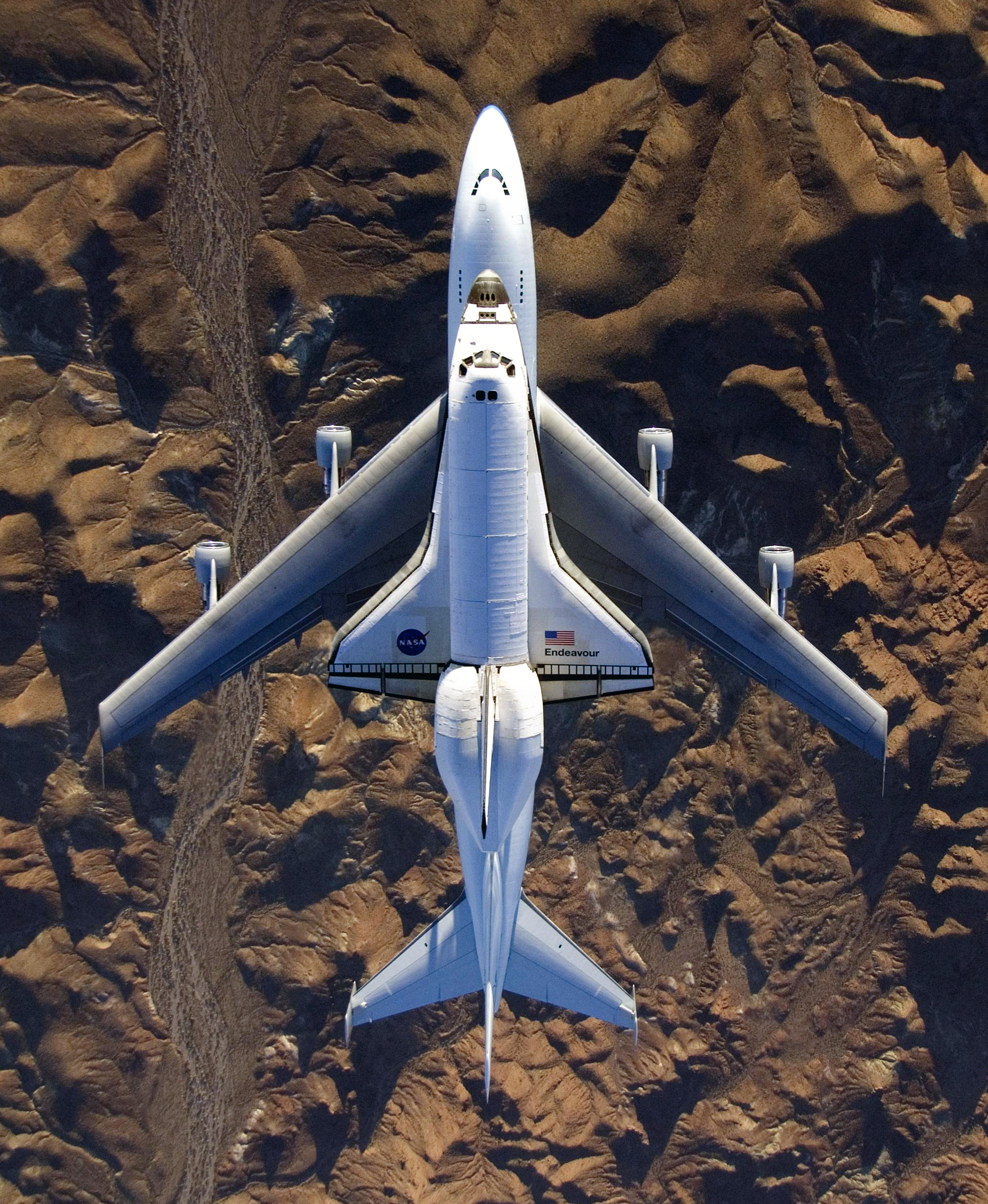
Overhead views of Columbia (top) and Endeavour (bottom)

Columbia was the only operational orbiter with black chines. These were added because at first, shuttle designers did not know how reentry heating would affect the craft's upper wing surfaces. The chines allowed Columbia to be easily recognized at a distance, unlike the subsequent orbiters. The black chines were a late modification and were a high temperature paint over the white FRSI. The chines were modified on Columbia shortly before rollover to the Vehicle Assembly Building in late 1980 for STS-1. The only other orbiter with black chines was Pathfinder, but it was a cosmetic test article and only gained them when it was refurbished.

Additionally, until its last refit, Columbia was the only operational orbiter with wing markings consisting of an American flag on the port (left) wing and the letters "USA" on the starboard (right) wing. Challenger, Discovery, Atlantis, and Endeavour all, until 1998, bore markings consisting of the letters "USA" above an American flag on the left-wing, and the pre-1998 NASA "worm" logotype afore the respective orbiter's name on the right-wing. Enterprise, the test vehicle which was the prototype for Columbia, originally had the same wing markings as Columbia but with white chines and the "USA" letters on the right-wing spaced closer together. Enterprise's markings were modified to match Challenger in 1983. The name of the orbiter was originally placed on the payload bay doors much like Enterprise but was placed on the crew cabin after the Challenger disaster so that the orbiter could be easily identified while in orbit.

From its last refit following the conclusion of STS-93 to its destruction, Columbia bore markings identical to those of its operational sister orbiters–the NASA "meatball" insignia on the left-wing and the American flag afore the orbiter's name on the right-wing. Columbia only flew twice with these markings, STS-109 and STS-107.

=== SILTS pod ===
Another unique external feature, termed the "SILTS" pod (Shuttle Infrared Leeside Temperature Sensing), was located on the top of Columbia's vertical stabilizer, and was installed after STS-9 to acquire infrared and other thermal data. Though the pod's equipment was removed after initial tests, NASA decided to leave it in place, mainly to save costs, along with the agency's plans to use it for future experiments. The vertical stabilizer was later modified to incorporate the drag chute first used on Endeavour in 1992.

=== OEX/MADS "black box" ===
One unique feature that permanently stayed on Columbia from STS-1 to STS-107 was the OEX (Orbiter Experiments) box or MADS (Modular Auxiliary Data System) recorder. On March 19, 2003, this "black box" was found slightly damaged but fully intact by the U.S. Forest Service in San Augustine County in Texas after weeks of search and recovery efforts after the Space Shuttle Columbia disaster. The OEX/MADS was not designed to survive a catastrophic loss like an airplane black box.

=== Other upgrades ===
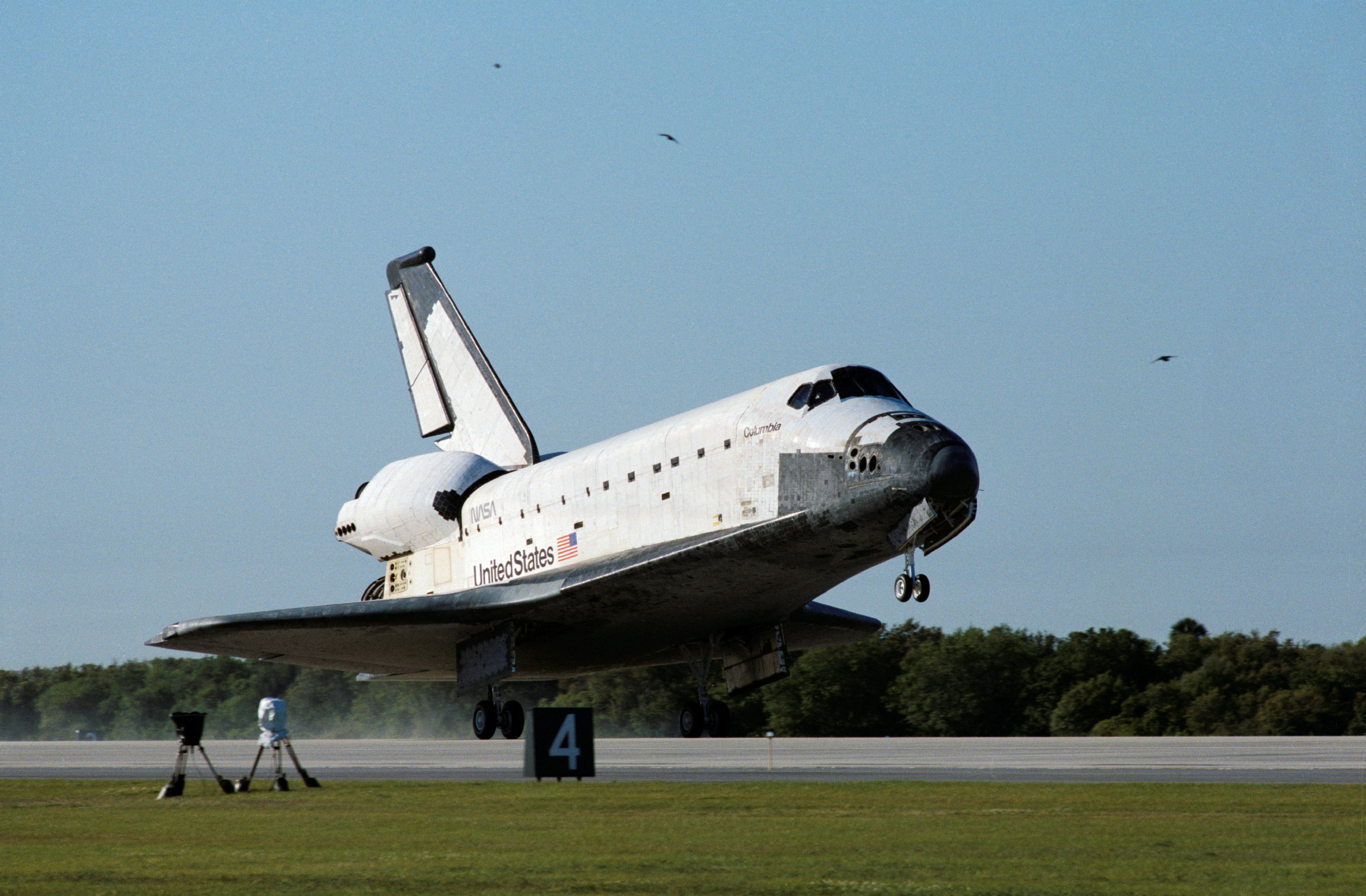
Columbia landing at the SLF Runway 33 (STS-62 mission)

Columbia was originally fitted with Lockheed-built ejection seats identical to those found on the SR-71 Blackbird. These were active for the four orbital test flights, but deactivated after STS-4, and removed entirely after STS-9. Columbia was the only spaceworthy orbiter not delivered with head-up displays for the Commander and Pilot, although these were incorporated after STS-9. Like its sister ships, Columbia was eventually retrofitted with the new MEDS "glass cockpit" display and lightweight seats.

=== Planned future ===
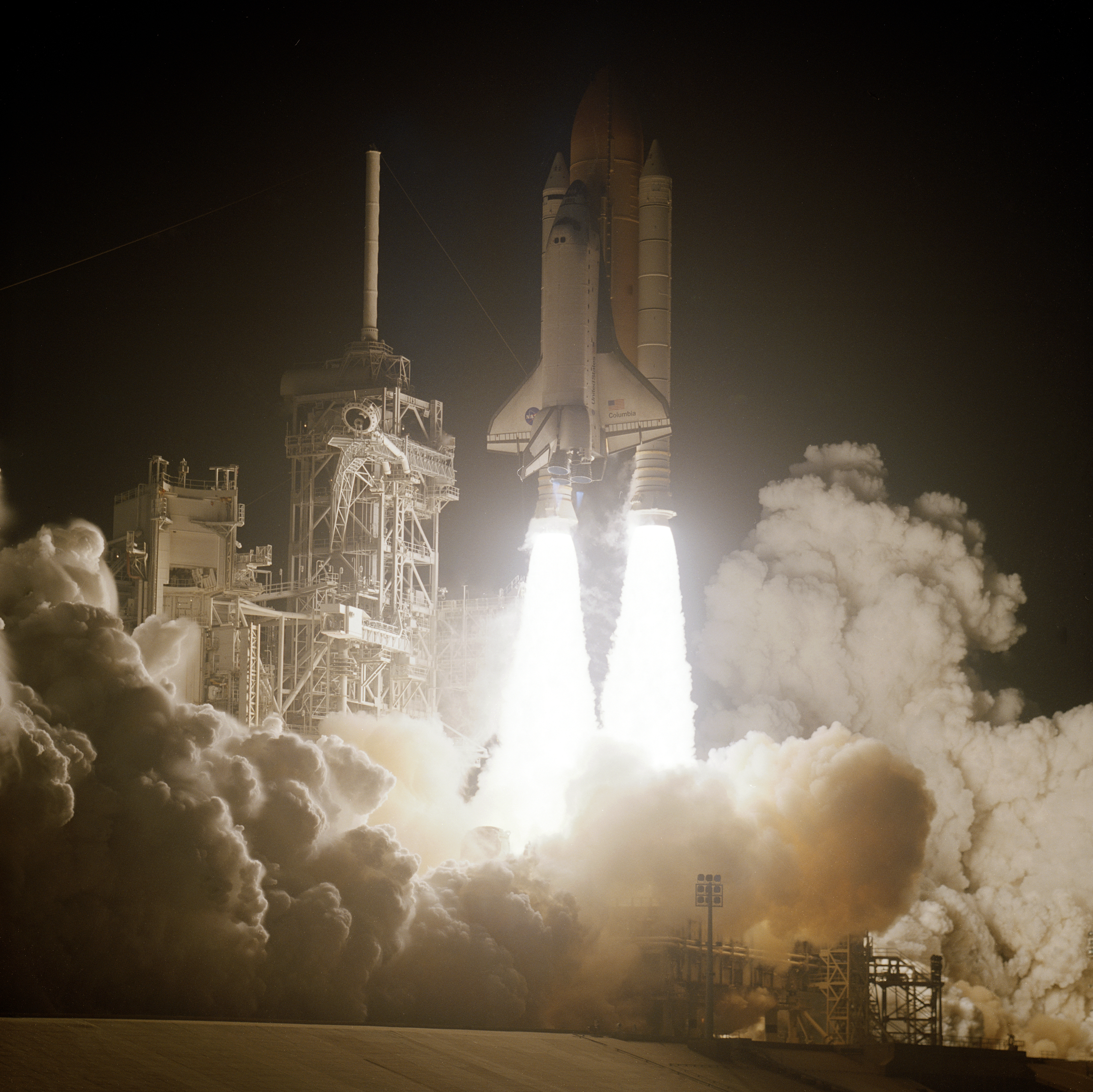
Space Shuttle Columbia STS-109(HST-3B) launch, its final successful mission

Had Columbia not been destroyed, it would have been fitted with the external airlock/docking adapter for STS-118, an International Space Station assembly mission, originally planned for November 2003. Columbia was scheduled for this mission due to Discovery being out of service for its Orbital Major Modification, and because the ISS assembly schedule could not be adhered to with only Endeavour and Atlantis.

Columbia's career would have started to wind down after STS-118. It was to service the Hubble Space Telescope two more times between 2004 and 2005. Following the Columbia accident, NASA flew the STS-125 mission using Atlantis, combining the planned fourth and fifth servicing missions into one final mission to Hubble. Because of the retirement of the Space Shuttle fleet, the batteries and gyroscopes that keep the telescope pointed will eventually fail, which would result in its reentry and breakup in Earth's atmosphere. A "Soft Capture Docking Mechanism", based on the docking adapter that was to be used on the Orion spacecraft, was installed during the last servicing mission in anticipation of this event.

== Flights ==
Columbia flew 28 missions, gathering 300.74 days spent in space with 4,808 orbits and a total distance of 125,204,911.5 miles (201,497,773.1 km) until STS-107.

Though having been in service during the Shuttle-Mir and International Space Station programs, Columbia did not fly any missions that visited a space station. The other three active orbiters at the time had visited both Mir and the ISS at least once. Columbia was built according to a heavier earlier design with a reduced payload for ISS missions, so it was decided not to install a Space Station docking system. This made room for longer science modules such as Spacelab and the Spacehab Research Double Module, so Columbia was used instead for science missions and for Hubble Space Telescope service.

#	Date	Designation	Launch pad	Landing location	Notes
1	April 12, 1981	STS-1	LC-39A	Edwards, Runway 23	First shuttle mission.
2	November 12, 1981	STS-2	LC-39A	Edwards, Runway 23	First re-use of a space vehicle.
3	March 22, 1982	STS-3	LC-39A	White Sands, Runway 17	First mission with an unpainted external tank. First and only space shuttle landing at White Sands.
4	June 27, 1982	STS-4	LC-39A	Edwards, Runway 22	Last shuttle R&D flight
5	November 11, 1982	STS-5	LC-39A	Edwards, Runway 22	First four-person crew, first deployment of commercial satellite.
6	November 28, 1983	STS-9	LC-39A	Edwards, Runway 17	First six-person crew, first Spacelab.
7	January 12, 1986	STS-61-C	LC-39A	Edwards, Runway 22	Rep. Bill Nelson (D-FL) on board the final successful shuttle flight before the Challenger disaster
8	August 8, 1989	STS-28	LC-39B	Edwards, Runway 17	Launched KH-11 reconnaissance satellite; first launch of Columbia from Launch Complex 39-B
9	January 9, 1990	STS-32	LC-39A	Edwards, Runway 22	Retrieved Long Duration Exposure Facility
10	December 2, 1990	STS-35	LC-39B	Edwards, Runway 22	Carried multiple X-ray and UV telescopes
11	June 5, 1991	STS-40	LC-39B	Edwards, Runway 22	5th Spacelab – Life Sciences-1
12	June 25, 1992	STS-50	LC-39A	Kennedy, Runway 33	U.S. Microgravity Laboratory 1 (USML-1)
13	October 22, 1992	STS-52	LC-39B	Kennedy, Runway 33	Deployed Laser Geodynamic Satellite II
14	April 26, 1993	STS-55	LC-39A	Edwards, Runway 22	German Spacelab D-2 Microgravity Research
15	October 18, 1993	STS-58	LC-39B	Edwards, Runway 22	Spacelab Life Sciences
16	March 4, 1994	STS-62	LC-39B	Kennedy, Runway 33	United States Microgravity Payload-2 (USMP-2)
17	July 8, 1994	STS-65	LC-39A	Kennedy, Runway 33	International Microgravity Laboratory (IML-2)
18	October 20, 1995	STS-73	LC-39B	Kennedy, Runway 33	United States Microgravity Laboratory (USML-2)
19	February 22, 1996	STS-75	LC-39B	Kennedy, Runway 33	Tethered Satellite System Reflight (TSS-1R)
20	June 20, 1996	STS-78	LC-39B	Kennedy, Runway 33	Life and Microgravity Spacelab (LMS)
21	November 19, 1996	STS-80	LC-39B	Kennedy, Runway 33	Third flight of Wake Shield Facility (WSF) and longest Shuttle flight
22	April 4, 1997	STS-83	LC-39A	Kennedy, Runway 33	Microgravity Science Laboratory (MSL), cut short
23	July 1, 1997	STS-94	LC-39A	Kennedy, Runway 33	Microgravity Science Laboratory (MSL), reflight
24	November 19, 1997	STS-87	LC-39B	Kennedy, Runway 33	United States Microgravity Payload (USMP-4)
25	April 13, 1998	STS-90	LC-39B	Kennedy, Runway 33	Neurolab – Spacelab
26	July 23, 1999	STS-93	LC-39B	Kennedy, Runway 33	Deployed Chandra X-ray Observatory; first female Shuttle Commander Eileen Collins; last launch of Columbia from Launch Complex 39-B
27	March 1, 2002	STS-109	LC-39A	Kennedy, Runway 33	Hubble Space Telescope service mission (HSM-3B)
28	January 16, 2003	STS-107	LC-39A	Did not land (Planned to land at Kennedy, Runway 33)	A multi-disciplinary microgravity and Earth science research mission. Shuttle destroyed during re-entry on February 1, 2003, and all seven astronauts on board killed.

=== Mission and tribute insignias ===
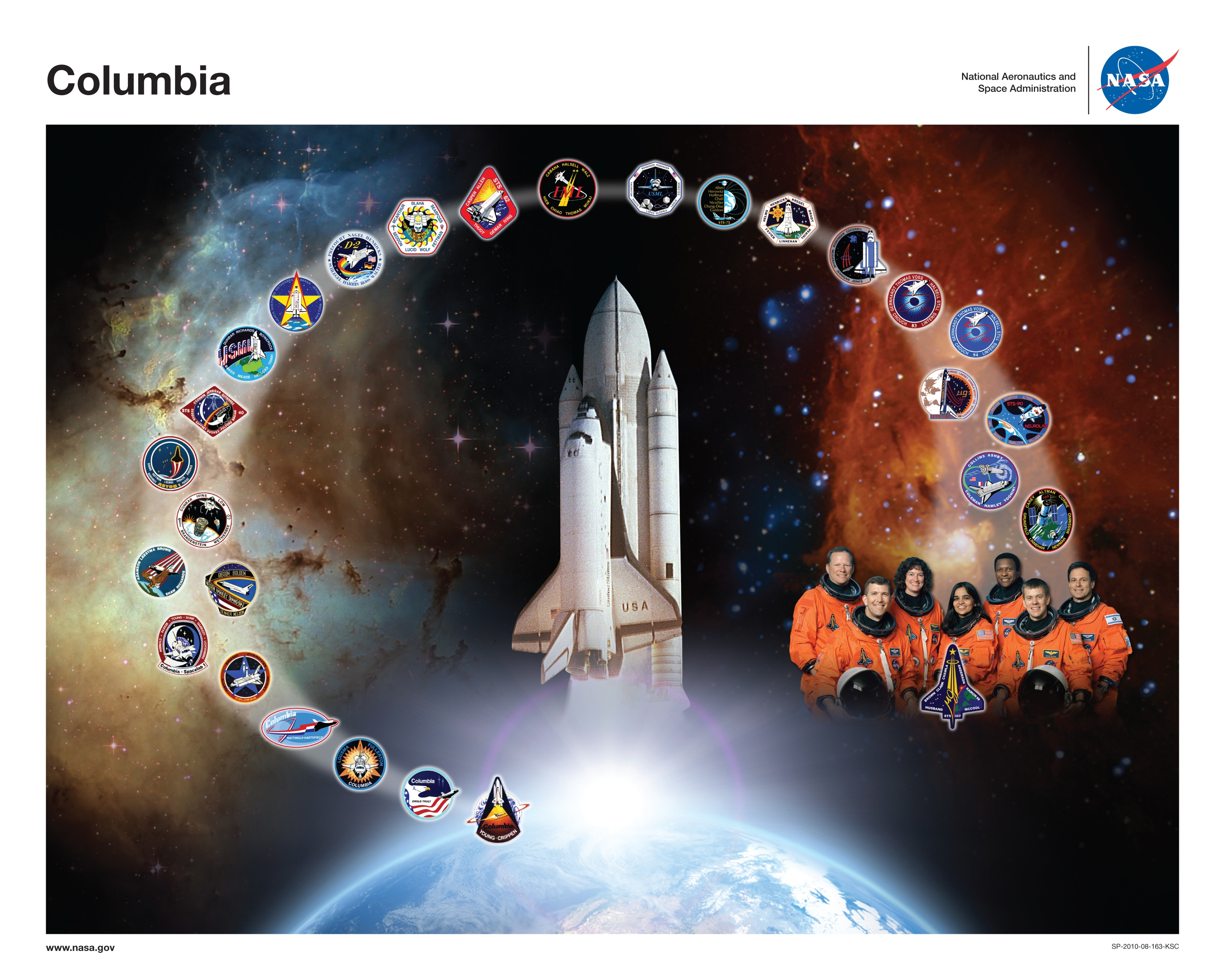
NASA Orbiter Tribute for Space Shuttle Columbia

Mission insignia for Columbia flights
STS-1	STS-2	STS-3	STS-4	STS-5	STS 9	STS-61-C	
STS-28	STS-32	STS-35	STS-40	STS-50	STS-52	STS-55	STS-58
STS-62	STS-65	STS-73	STS-75	STS-78	STS-80	STS-83	STS-94
STS-87	STS-90	STS-93	STS-109	STS-107	STS-118*		

* Mission flown by Endeavour due to loss of Columbia on STS-107.

== Final mission and disaster ==
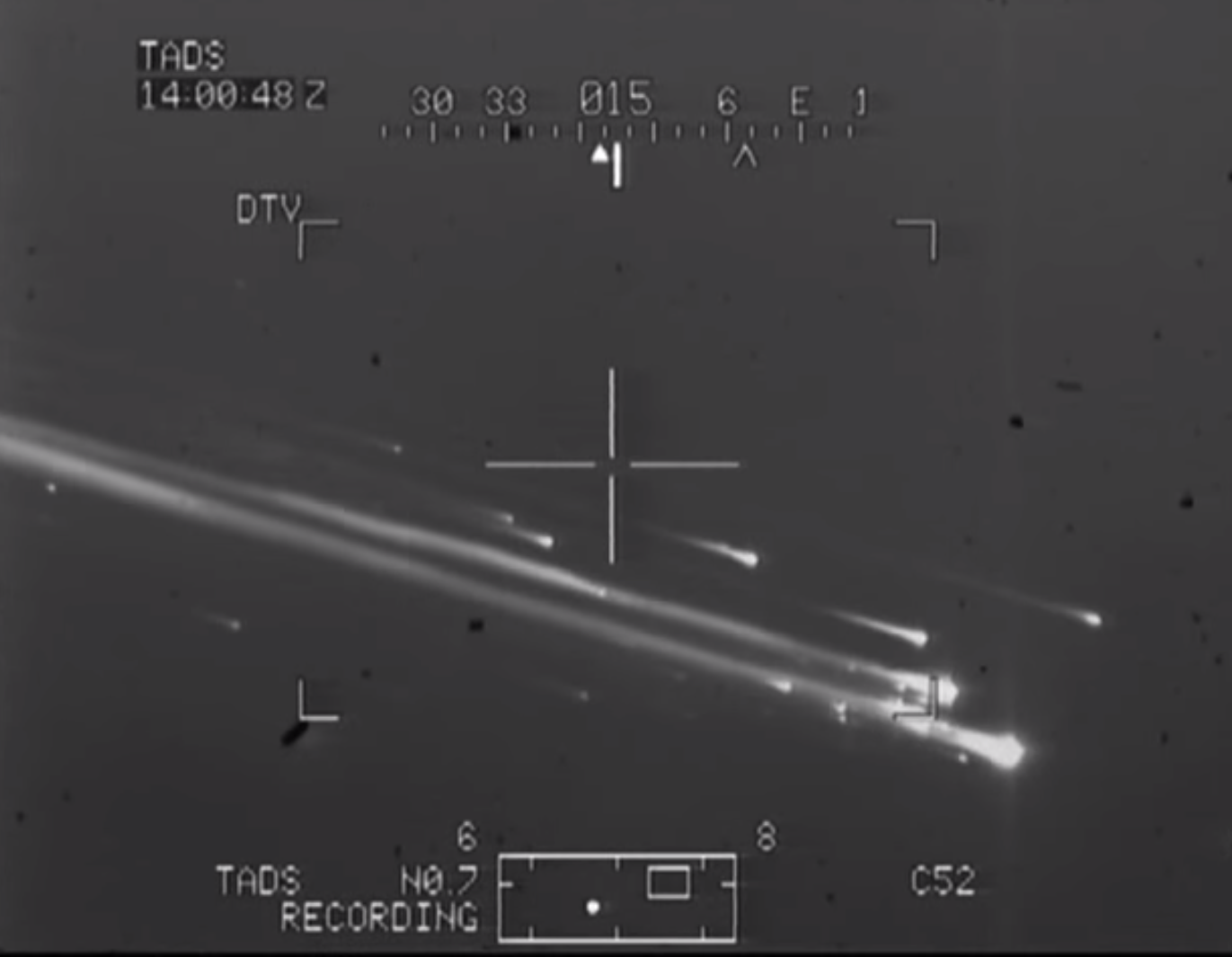
Rare Day TV (DTV) imaging photograph of Columbia's disintegration captured by an AH-64D Apache's gun camera during training with RNLAF (Royal Netherlands Air Force) personnel out of Fort Hood, Texas

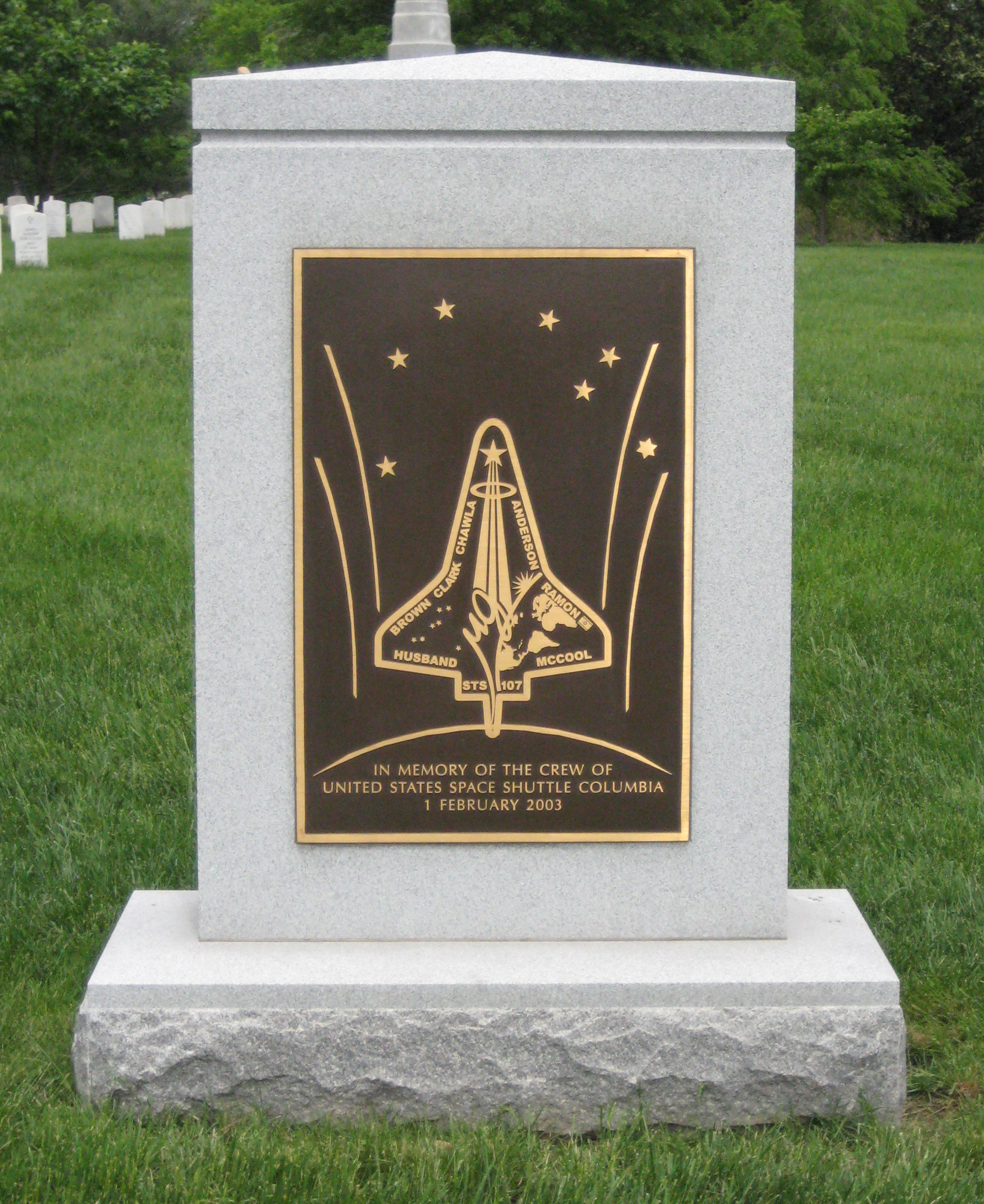
Columbia memorial in Arlington National Cemetery

Columbia disintegrated on February 1, 2003, around 09:00 EST during atmospheric re-entry after a 16-day scientific mission. The Columbia Accident Investigation Board has determined that one of Columbia's wings, made of a carbon composite, had been punctured 16 days earlier. A hole had formed when the external fuel tank shed material that peeled off during the launch, and struck the shuttle's left wing. During the intense heat of re-entry, hot gases penetrated the interior of the wing. The likely result was a compromise of the hydraulic system, leading to failure of the linkage to control surfaces. The resulting loss of control would have exposed minimally protected areas of the orbiter to full-entry heating and dynamic pressures that ultimately led to break up of the entire spacecraft.

The report delved deeply into the underlying organizational and cultural issues the board believed contributed to the accident. The report was highly critical of NASA's decision-making and risk-assessment processes. Further, the report outlined several potential options for saving the crew which NASA had not considered during the mission, such as a potential rescue with the shuttle Atlantis (then being prepared for launch for STS-114), or in-flight repairs for the damaged wing. The nearly 84,000 pieces of collected debris of the vessel are stored in a large room on the 16th-floor of the Vehicle Assembly Building at the Kennedy Space Center. The collection was opened to the media once and has since been open only to researchers. Unlike Challenger, for which a replacement orbiter was built, Columbia was not replaced.

The seven crew members who died aboard this final mission were: Rick Husband, Commander; William C. McCool, Pilot; Michael P. Anderson, Payload Commander/Mission Specialist 3; David M. Brown, Mission Specialist 1; Kalpana Chawla, Mission Specialist 2; Laurel Clark, Mission Specialist 4; and Ilan Ramon, Payload Specialist 1.

== Tributes and memorials ==
=== Patricia Huffman Smith Museum ===
The debris field encompassed hundreds of miles across Texas extending into Louisiana and Arkansas. The nose cap and remains of all seven crew members were found in Sabine County, East Texas. The Patricia Huffman Smith NASA Museum "Remembering Columbia" was opened in Hemphill, Sabine County. The museum documents Columbia explorations throughout all its missions, including the final STS-107. Its exhibits also show the efforts of local citizens during the recovery period of the Columbia shuttle debris and its crew's remains. An area is dedicated to each STS-107 crew member, and also to the Texas Forest Service helicopter pilot who died in the recovery effort. The museum houses many objects and artifacts from NASA and its contractors, the families of the STS-107 crew and other individuals. The crew's families contributed personal items of the crew members to be on permanent display. The museum features two interactive simulator displays that emulate activities of the shuttle and orbiter, and the digital learning center and its classroom provide educational opportunities.

=== Columbia Memorial Space Center ===
The Columbia Memorial Space Center is the U.S. national memorial for the Space Shuttle Columbia's seven crew members. It is located in Downey, California on the site of the Space Shuttle's origin and production, the former North American Aviation plant in Los Angeles County, California. The facility is also a hands-on learning center with interactive exhibits, workshops, and classes about space science, astronautics, and the Space Shuttle program's legacy—providing educational opportunities for all ages.

=== Naming dedications ===
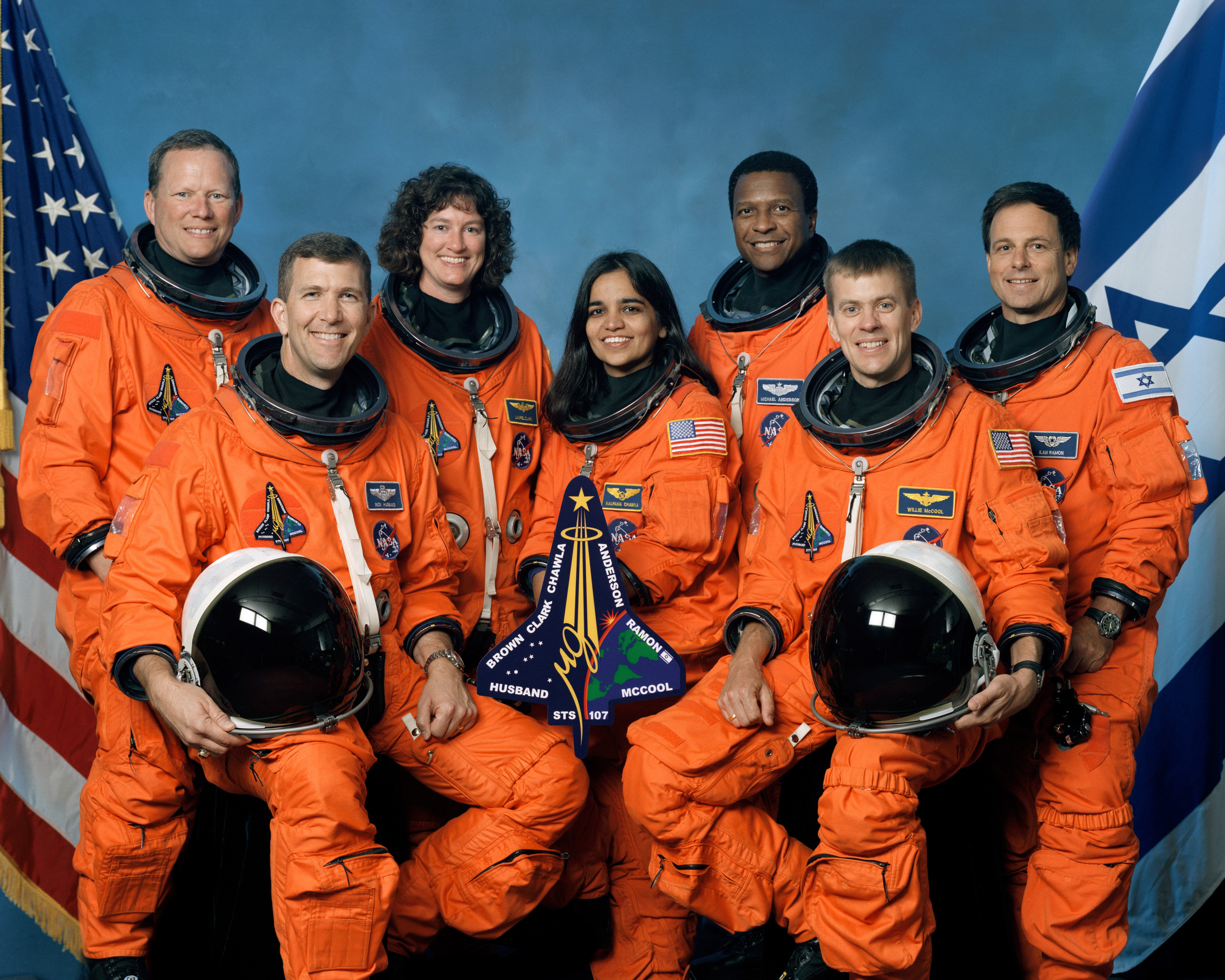
The crew of STS-107 in October 2001, from left to right: Brown, Husband, Clark, Chawla, Anderson, McCool, Ramon

The Shuttle's final crew was honored in 2003 when the United States Board on Geographic Names approved the name Columbia Point for a 13,980-foot (4,260 m) mountain in Colorado's Sangre de Cristo Mountains, less than a half-mile from Challenger Point, a peak named after America's other lost Space Shuttle. The Columbia Hills on Mars were also named in honor of the crew, and a host of other memorials were dedicated in various forms.

The Columbia supercomputer at the NASA Advanced Supercomputing (NAS) Division located at Ames Research Center in California was named in honor of the crew lost in the 2003 disaster. Built as a joint effort between NASA and technical partners SGI and Intel in 2004, the supercomputer was used in scientific research of space, the Earth's climate, and aerodynamic design of space launch vehicles and aircraft. The first part of the system, built in 2003, was dedicated to STS-107 astronaut and engineer Kalpana Chawla, who prior to joining the Space Shuttle program worked at Ames Research Center.

A female bald eagle at the National Eagle Center in Wabasha, Minnesota is named in tribute to the victims of the disaster.

== In popular culture ==
A refurbished Columbia features prominently in a 1999 episode of Cowboy Bebop, being used to rescue series protagonist Spike from burning up in Earth's atmosphere after his ship runs out of fuel. Columbia is depicted taking off horizontally with the aid of small boosters mounted near its nose. After capturing the stray craft in its cargo bay, Columbia encounters trouble on its return to Earth, including a failure of the heat shielding, finally crash landing in a desert with its occupants unharmed. Following the real-world disaster, Adult Swim temporarily removed the episode from its rotation.

In response to the loss of Columbia, guitarist Steve Morse of the rock band Deep Purple wrote the instrumental "Contact Lost", which was featured as the closing track on their 2003 album Bananas. It was dedicated to the astronauts who died in the disaster, and Morse's songwriting royalties were donated to the families of the lost astronauts. Astronaut and mission specialist engineer Kalpana Chawla, one of the victims of the accident, was a fan of Deep Purple and had exchanged e-mails with the band during the flight, making the tragedy even more personal for the group. She took three CDs into space with her, two of which were Deep Purple albums Machine Head and Purpendicular. Both CDs survived the destruction of the shuttle and the 39-mile plunge.

Several songs in popular music give minor tribute to Columbia, and some are dedicated. The Eric Johnson instrumental "Columbia" from his 2005 album Bloom was written as a commemoration and tribute to the lives that were lost. Johnson said "I wanted to make it more of a positive message, a salute, a celebration rather than just concentrating on a few moments of tragedy, but instead the bigger picture of these brave people's lives." The Canadian Band Rush made a song 'Countdown' on their album 'Signals' which is about the first Space Shuttle launch by Columbia. The Scottish band Runrig pays tribute to Clark on the 2016 album The Story. The final track, "Somewhere," ends with a recording of her voice. Clark was a Runrig fan and had a wake up call with Runrig's "Running to the Light". She took a CD copy of the band's eleventh album The Stamping Ground into space with her. When the shuttle broke up, the CD was found back on Earth and was presented to the band by her family.

The Columbia appears as an exhibit within the Pewter City Museum in Pokémon Red and Blue.

== See also ==
- List of human spaceflights
- List of Space Shuttle crews
- List of Space Shuttle missions
- List of spaceflight-related accidents and incidents
- Timeline of Space Shuttle missions
