= Astrotech Corporation =

Technology incubator based in Texas, US

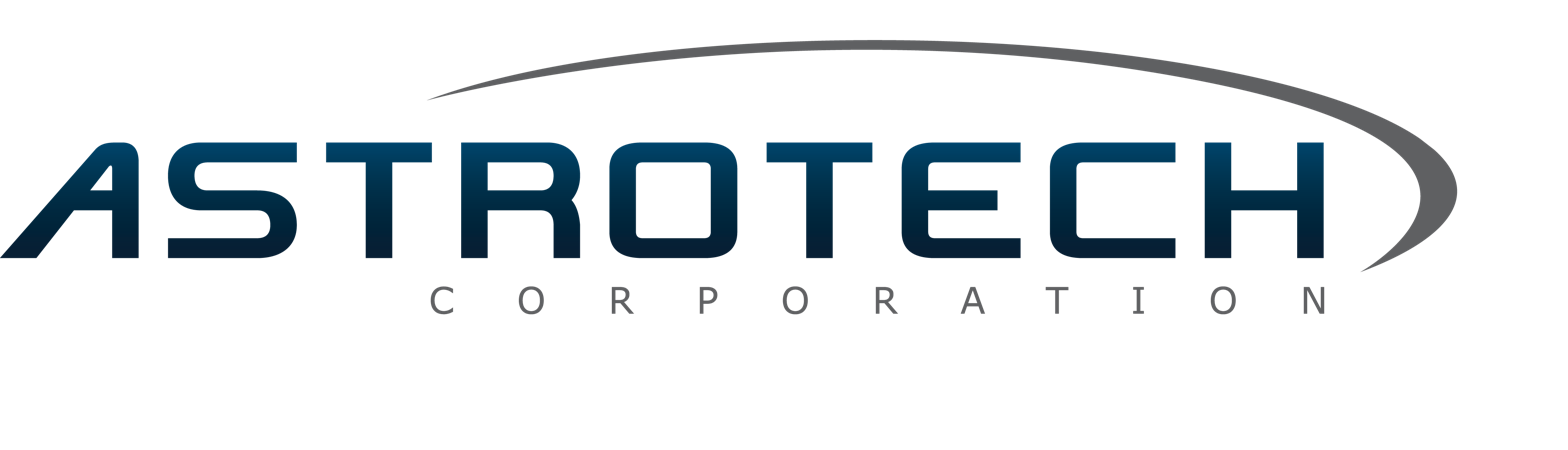
- Traded as: Nasdaq: ASTC
- Industry: Science & Technology
- Founded: 1984; 42 years ago
- Headquarters: Austin, Texas, U.S.
- Number of locations: 3
- Key people: Thomas Pickens, CEO
- Services: Technology Incubator
- Number of employees: 71

Astrotech Corporation, formerly Spacehab Inc., is a technology incubator headquartered in Austin, Texas. Astrotech uses technology sourced internally and from research institutions, government laboratories, and universities to fund, manage and sell start-up companies. Astrotech Corporation's subsidiaries provide commercial products and services to NASA, the U.S. Department of Defense, national space agencies, and global commercial customers.

Astrotech Corporation was established in 1984. Prior to 2009, it was known as SPACEHAB, Inc., a company that provided space habitat microgravity experimentation equipment and services to NASA during the Space Shuttle era. As the Shuttle program came to an end, the company put more focus on its spacecraft processing business, Astrotech Space Operations, Inc. (ASO), its mass spectrometer instrumentation business, 1st Detect, Inc. and its microgravity vaccine development company, Astrogenetix, Inc. In August 2014, the company sold Astrotech Space Operations. In February 2015, the company acquired defect correction software and Astral Images Corp. was created to commercialize government funded satellite imagery processing technology and research into automated image correction and enhancement.

== Spacehab (1984–2009) ==
Former logo of Spacehab Inc.

Spacehab Research Double Module (RDM) in the Space Shuttle

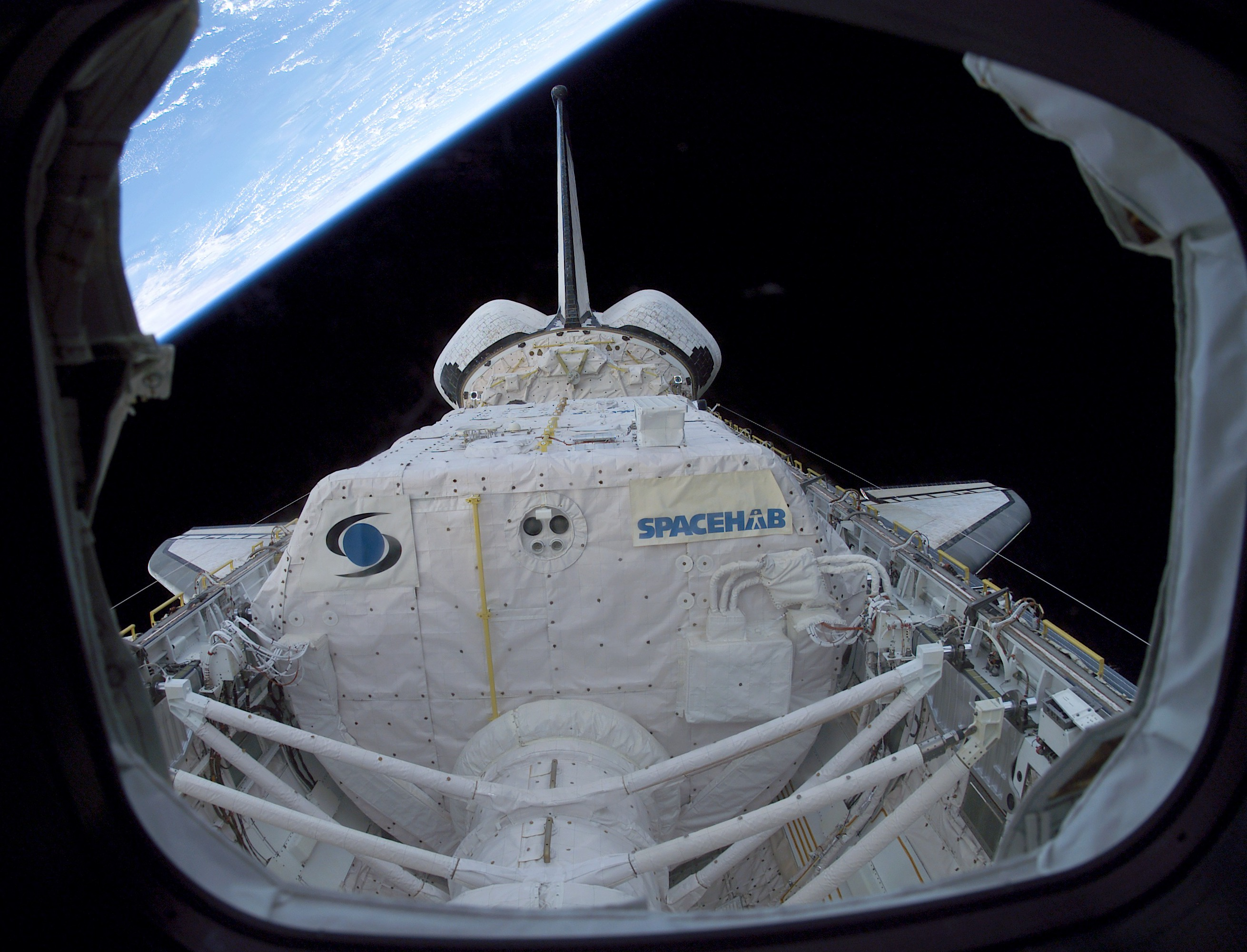
Spacehab Research Double Module on board STS-107

Spacehab was founded in 1984 by Bob Citron with the help and support of CSP Associates from Cambridge, Massachusetts. The team from CSP Associates included founder David W. Lippy along with his partners Brad Meslin and Marc Oderman. It was one of CSP's consultants, Dr. David Williamson who conceived of the idea to increase the cargo space on the Shuttles as the primary focus of the Spacehab mission. Early venture capital was supplied by Al Zesiger of BEA Associates in New York City as well as Dr. Shelley Harrison also from New York. CSP Associates and its venture contacts were responsible for raising most of the early seed money to get the company off the ground and funded. Throughout its more than 20-year history, Spacehab has contracted over $1 billion dollars in total sales.

=== Spacehab hardware for Space Shuttle missions ===
Spacehab hardware consisted of:

- Integrated Cargo Carrier (ICC), unpressurized
- External Stowage Platform (ESP-2 and ESP-3), an ICC variant
- Logistics Single Module (LSM) and Logistics Double Module (LDM)
- Single Module (SM) and Research Double Module (RDM), pressurized

The Spacehab hardware was designed to be nestled inside the cargo bay of the Space Shuttles and flew on 22 Space Shuttle missions, including seven to the Russian space station Mir and eight to the International Space Station (ISS). The Single Module flew on seven missions, and the Research Double Module flew only on the ill-fated Columbia STS-107 mission, in which it was destroyed.

The inaugural flight of Spacehab's research double module, which launched January 2003 on STS-107, ended when the Space Shuttle Columbia broke up during re-entry. In February 2003 Spacehab received $17.7 million from its commercial insurance policy. In January 2004, Spacehab filed a formal claim against NASA for the amount of $87.7 million for the loss caused by the Columbia disaster and in October 2004 NASA paid the company $8.2 million. In February 2007, Spacehab dropped all litigation against NASA.

Spacehab's ICC hardware was further developed into the External Stowage Platform (ESP-2 and ESP-1), which are permanently deployed on the ISS. The ESP-2 is attached to the International Space Station's airlock, providing the only permanent, commercial "spare parts" facility for the ISS crew. ESP-3 was deployed during Space Shuttle mission STS-118, on August 8, 2007.

==== Flights ====
Flight	Date	Orbiter	Mission	Elements
STS-57	June/July 1993	Endeavour	Research	SM
STS-60	February 1994	Discovery	Wake Shield Facility	SM
STS-63	February 1995	Discovery	Mir rendezvous	SM
STS-76	March 1996	Atlantis	Mir docking	SM
STS-77	May 1996	Endeavour	SPARTAN	SM
STS-79	September 1996	Atlantis	Mir docking	LDM
STS-81	January 1997	Atlantis	Mir docking	LDM
STS-84	May 1997	Atlantis	Mir docking	LDM
STS-86	September/October 1997	Atlantis	Mir docking	LDM
STS-89	January 1998	Endeavour	Mir docking	LDM
STS-91	June 1998	Discovery	Mir docking	SM
STS-95	October/November 1998	Discovery	SPARTAN	SM
STS-96	May/June 1999	Discovery	ISS docking	LDM + ICC
STS-101	May 2000	Atlantis	ISS docking	LDM + ICC
STS-106	September 2000	Atlantis	ISS docking	LDM + ICC
STS-102	March 2001	Discovery	ISS docking	ICC + ESP-1
STS-105	August 2001	Discovery	ISS docking	ICC
STS-107	January/February 2003	Columbia	Research	RDM
STS-114	July/August 2005	Discovery	ISS docking	ESP-2
STS-121	July 2006	Discovery	ISS docking	ICC
STS-116	December 2006	Discovery	ISS docking	LSM + ICC
STS-118	August 2007	Endeavour	ISS docking	LSM + ESP-3

Legend:

- ESP - External Stowage Platform
- ICC - Integrated Cargo Carrier
- LDM - Logistics Double Module
- LSM - Logistics Single Module
- SM - Single Module
- RDM - Research Double Module

== Astrotech Corporation (2009–present) ==
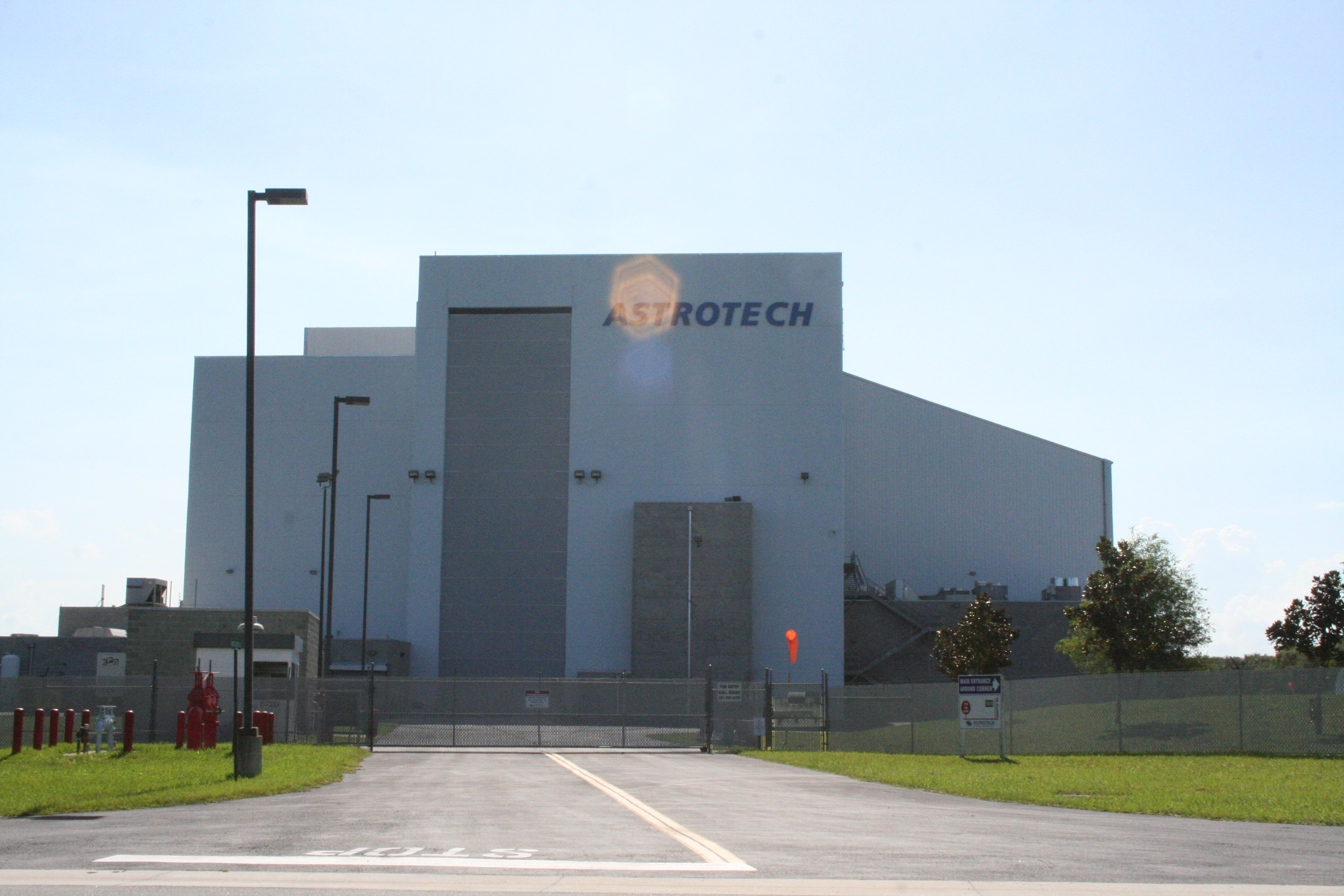
Astrotech Titusville spacecraft processing facility

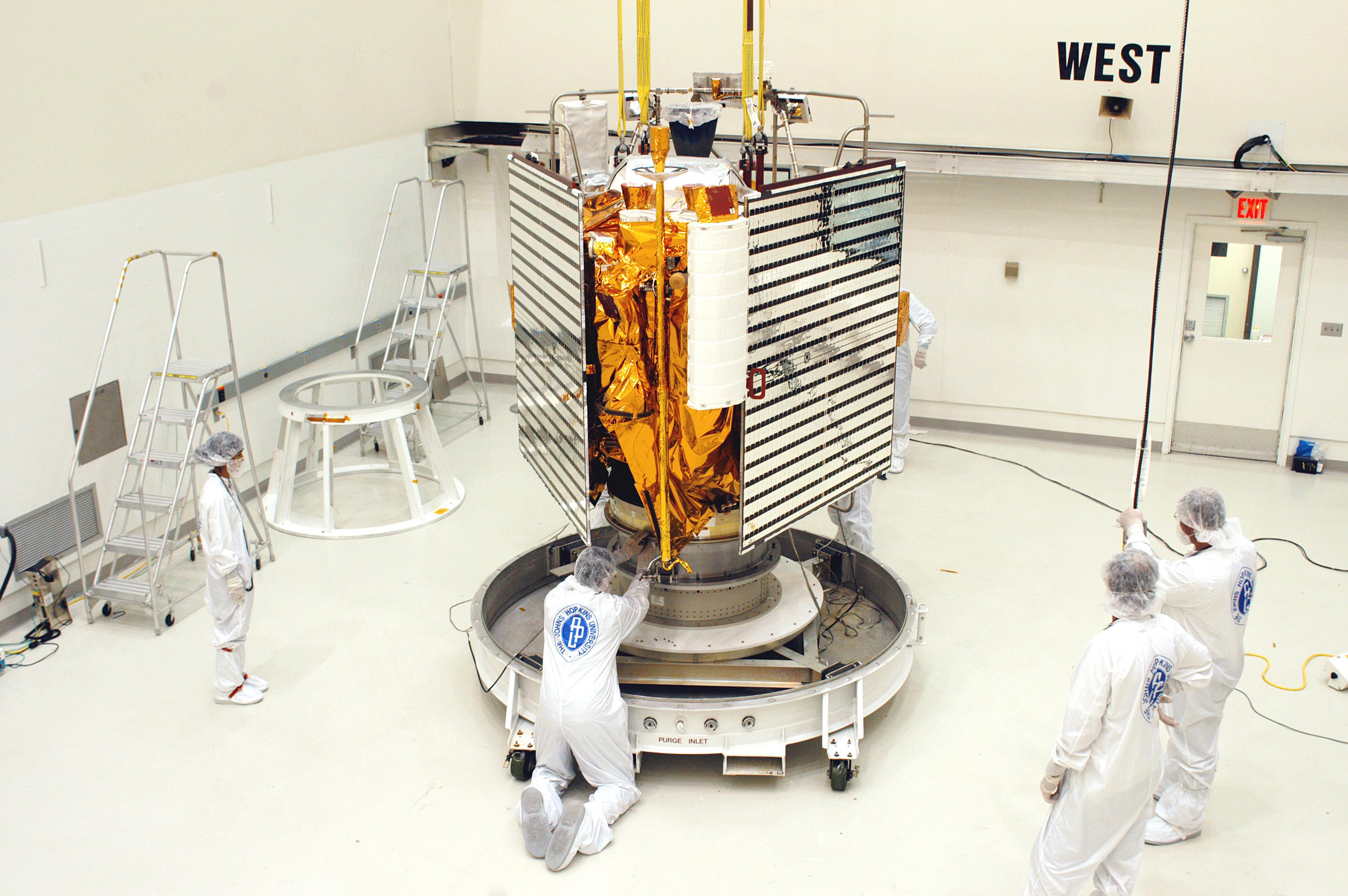
MESSENGER assembly at Astrotech

The Company changed its name to Astrotech Corporation in 2009 to align the corporate name with the company's core business offering, Astrotech Space Operation. ASO provides all support necessary for government and commercial customers to successfully process their satellite hardware for launch–including planning; construction and use of unique equipment and facilities; and spacecraft checkout, encapsulation, fueling, and transport. Astrotech Corporation management sold ASO, its state-of-the-art satellite servicing operations, to Lockheed Martin in August 2014.

=== Chemical detection and analysis ===
1st Detect, an Astrotech subsidiary, develops, manufactures, and sells mass spectrometers that can be used in explosive and chemical warfare detection for the Department of Homeland Security and the military. 1st Detect's miniature mass spectrometer technology was sourced from Oak Ridge National Laboratory's chemical analyzer research.

The company Astrotech Corporation (NASDAQ: ASTC) announced that its Astrotech Technologies, Inc. subsidiary had entered into an agreement with Sanmina Corporation to manufacture its mass spectrometry products. As part of the relationship, Sanmina will manufacture 1st Detect's TRACER 1000. They also agreed to manufacture AgLAB's AgLAB-1000 and BreathTech's BreathTest-1000 once those products are released.

=== Film restoration, correction, and enhancement ===
Astral Images sells conversion of film to digital images, using defect removal and color correction software, and post processing services, providing economically feasible conversion of television and feature 35mm and 16mm films to the new 4K ultra-high definition (UHD), high-dynamic range (HDR) format necessary for the new generation of digital distribution. Astral Images' core technology is sourced from decades of image research from the laboratories of IBM and Kodak combined with classified satellite technology from government laboratories.

=== Vaccine development ===
Sourced from NASA's extensive microgravity research, Astrogenetix is applying a fast-track on-orbit discovery platform using the International Space Station to develop vaccines and other therapeutics.

=== Space operations ===
Prior to the 2014 Lockheed Martin acquisition, Astrotech provided both the government and commercial space markets with satellite processing services through its Astrotech Space Operations (ASO) subsidiary located in Titusville, Florida, three miles (5 km) from the Kennedy Space Center. It has more than 150,000 square feet (14,000 m^{2}) of clean room processing space, and services payloads, or satellites, for United Launch Alliance's Atlas and Delta rocket families, Orbital Sciences' Taurus and Pegasus, and SpaceX's Falcon 9 launch vehicles. Astrotech owned and operated processing facilities located on Vandenberg Space Force Base at the Western Range in California. Also in California, ASO provided payload processing and facilities management support for the ocean-going Sea Launch program at the Home Port Facilities in Long Beach.

=== ARCTUS ===
On December 10, 2007, Spacehab released details about its planned Advanced Research and Conventional Technology Utilization Spacecraft designed to deliver cargo to, and return cargo from, the International Space Station. The project was later shelved.
