= McCool Hill =

Tallest of the Columbia Hills in Gusev crater, Mars

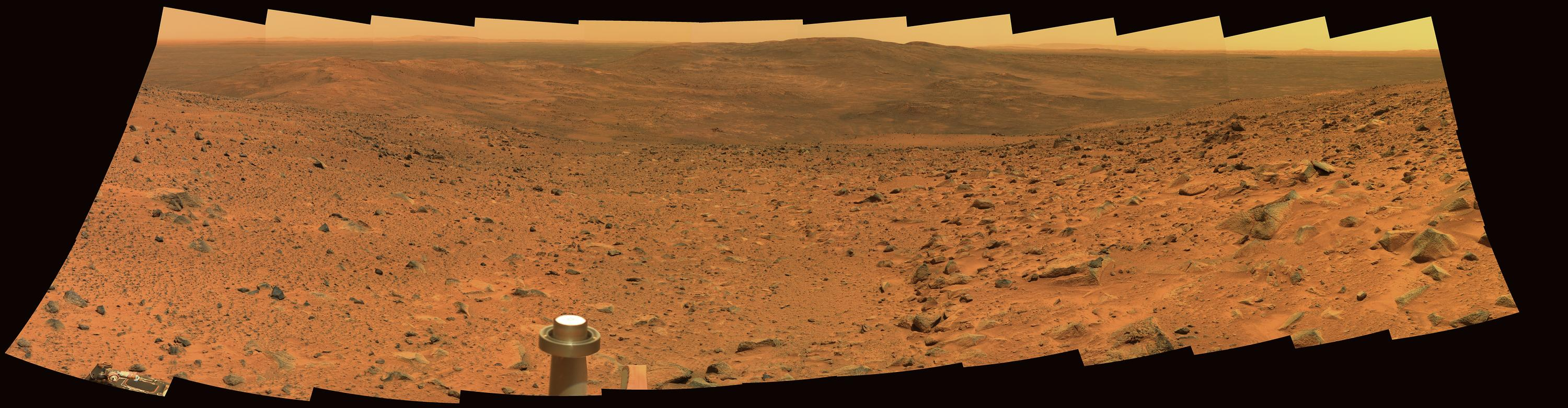
- McCool Hill, as seen from the summit of Husband Hill.
- Location: Columbia Hills
- Coordinates: 15°S 175°E
- Peak: approx. 130 m
- Discoverer: Spirit rover
- Eponym: William C. McCool

McCool Hill is the tallest of the Columbia Hills in Gusev crater, Mars. It was named in honor of William C. McCool, an astronaut of the Space Shuttle Columbia during its final mission where it disintegrated during atmospheric reentry (see Space Shuttle Columbia disaster).

== Spirit Rover ==
The hill was to be Spirit rover's next target. She was expected to reach significant north-facing slopes on the hill in mid-April 2006, and spend her second winter on Mars there. However, on the way to the slopes on "McCool Hill" between outcrops nicknamed "Oberth" and "Korolev," Spirit ran into an impassable sandy area. To increase solar power output, Spirit's handlers redirected the rover to a closer north-facing slope in an area known as "Low Ridge" or "Low Ridge Haven," about 20 meters away from the rover's position on sol 802 (April 5, 2006). Spirit spent the rest of the Martian winter here, operating from a fixed position for long periods of time, attempting to observe very small changes that would not be noticeable otherwise because the rover was moving much more often. Mission directors were undecided on where to go in the spring, either to re-attempt the climb of McCool Hill, go back to Home Plate, or elsewhere. In the end they decided to go to Low Ridge Haven.

Husband Hill was originally thought to be the highest of the Columbia Hills as seen from Columbia Memorial Station until surveying by Spirit updated elevation levels, placing McCool as the highest.

== See also ==
- Husband Hill
- Geography of Mars
