= Bonneville (crater) =

Crater on Mars

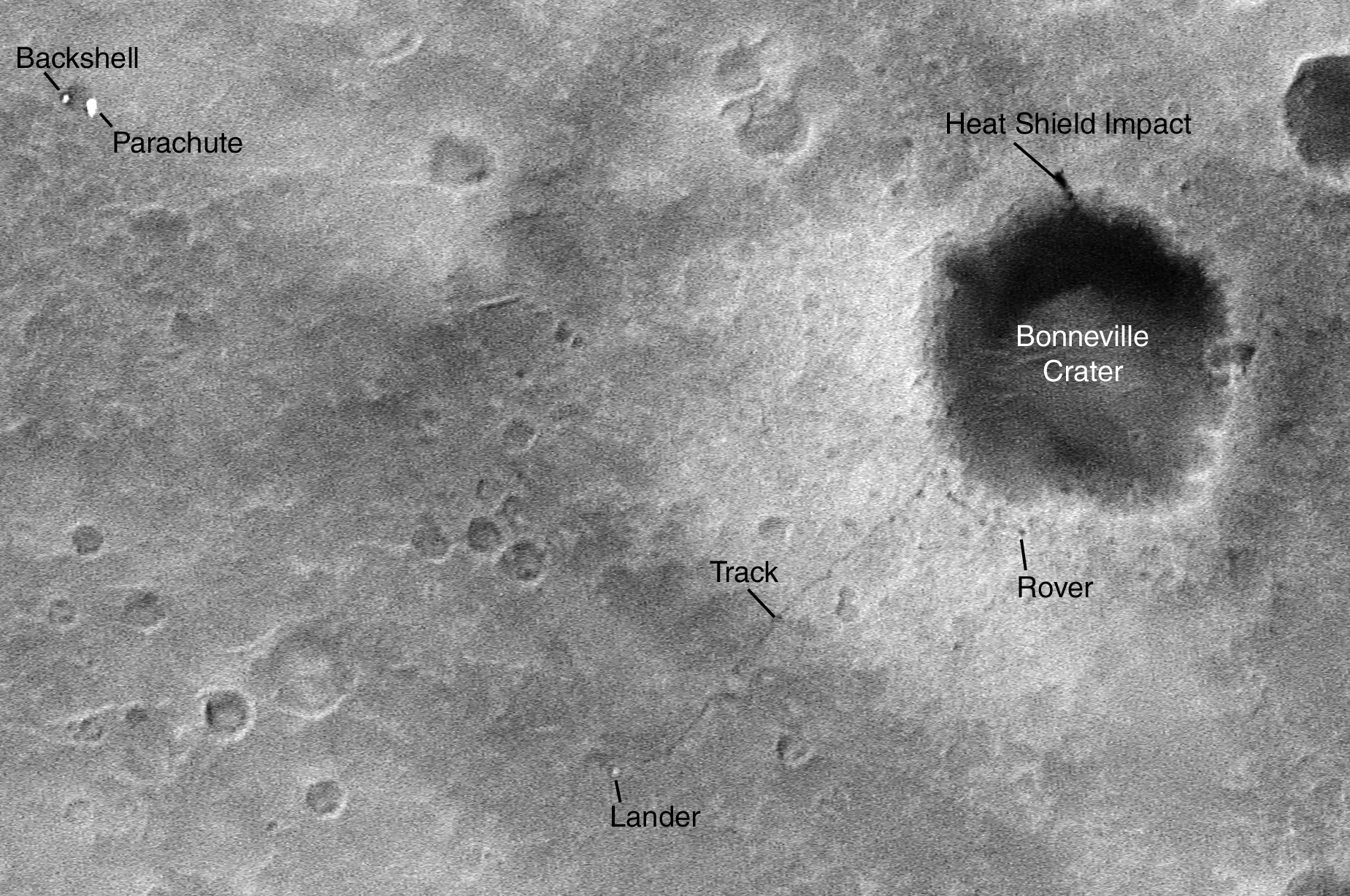
- Overhead view from Mars Global Surveyor on 20 December 2004 with the Spirit rover, its lander, parachute, heatshield impact, backshell and the rover tracks
- Planet: Mars
- Region: Gusev crater
- Coordinates: 14.6°S 175.5°E
- Quadrangle: Aeolis
- Diameter: 210 m
- Depth: 14 m
- Discoverer: Spirit rover
- Eponym: Lake Bonneville

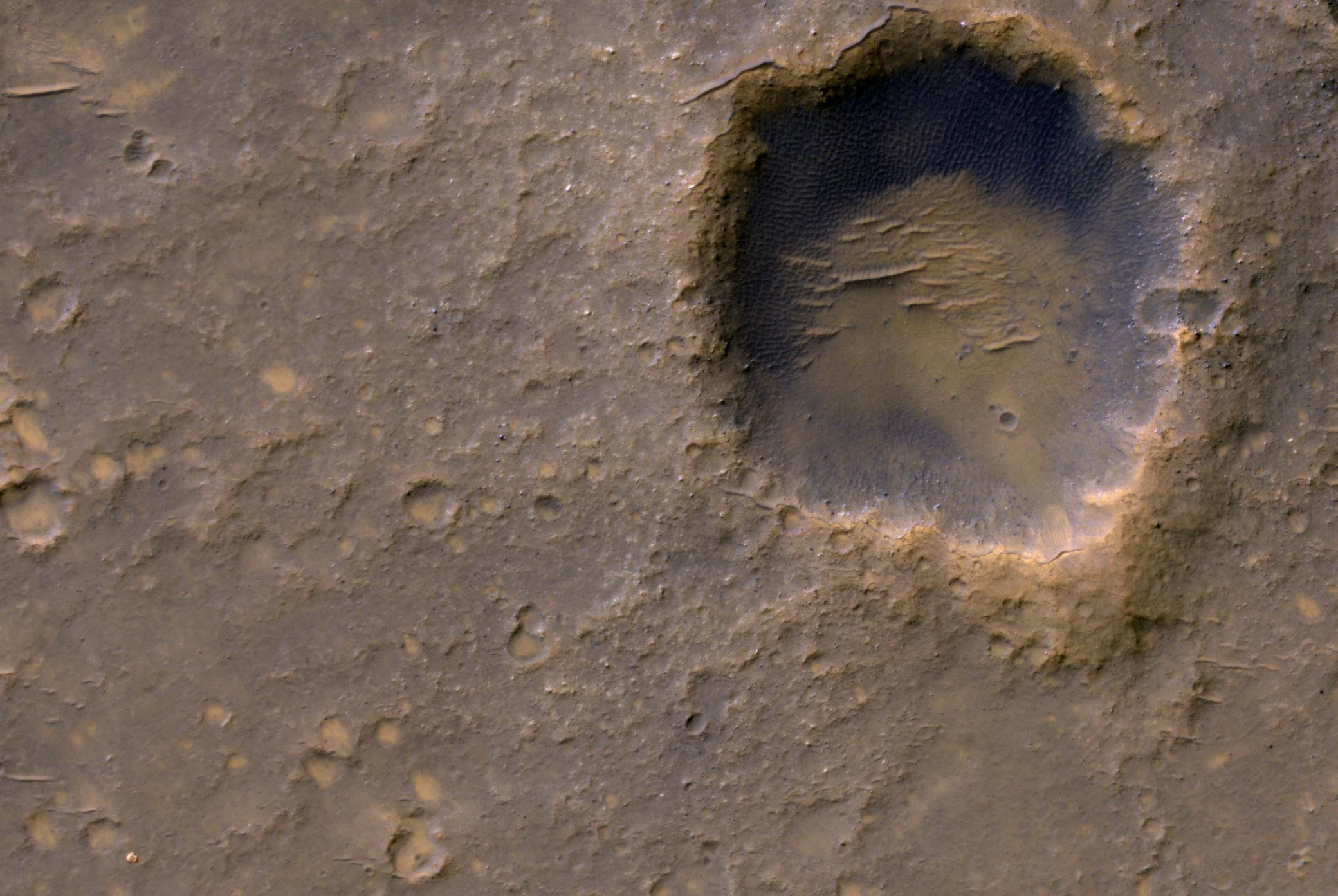
Bonneville crater and Spirit rover's lander as seen by HiRise-MRO in 2012

Bonneville is an impact crater on Mars. It is located within the much larger crater Gusev. Bonneville was visited by the Mars Exploration Rover Spirit in 2004, during its exploration of the floor of Gusev. Bonneville is also the final resting place of Spirit's heat shield, jettisoned during the landing procedure; the heat-shield could be seen glinting on the opposite wall when Spirit photographed the crater. The crater is 210 metres in diameter, 14 meters deep and its rim rises 6.4 metres above the surrounding terrain.

Bonneville is named after Benjamin Bonneville and Lake Bonneville, an ancient lake in Utah.

== Formation and geology ==
The strata into which Bonneville formed is thought to be loose debris, although some of the ejecta may have originated from more competent rocks. No underlying bedrock was exposed in the crater or the numerous craterlets in Bonneville's walls. The crater is relatively pristine and in particular has not been affected by water based erosion.

It is likely that Bonneville is a secondary crater, given its low depth to diameter ratio.

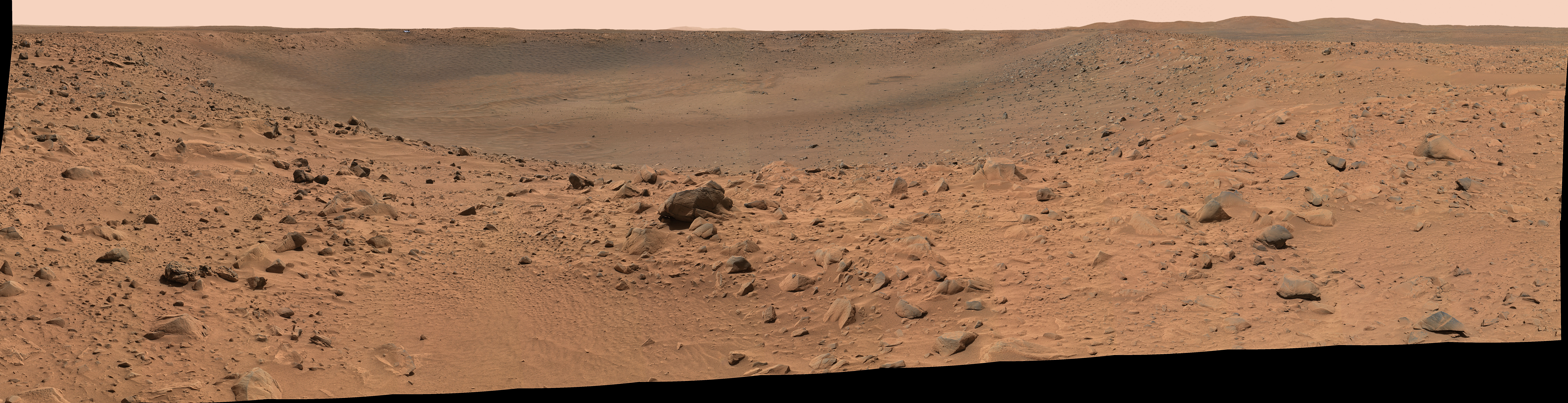
Panorama view of Bonneville crater, the Columbia Hills to the right, the heatshield visible at the horizon. This image was made from multiple images recorded in March 2004 by the rover using 750 nanometers, 530 nanometers, and 480 nanometers filters
