= Fumarole =

Volcanic opening that emits hot gases

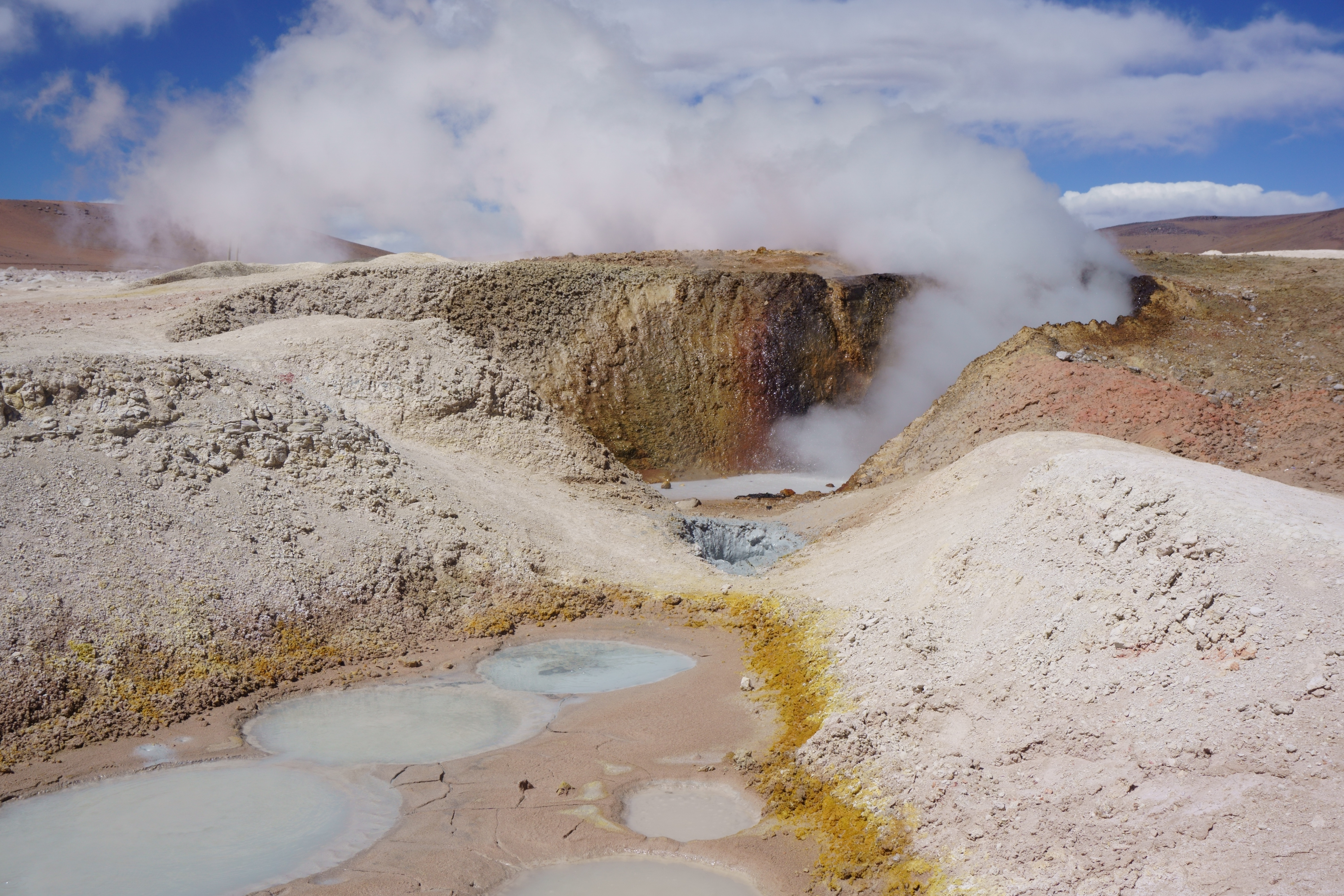
Fumarole at Sol de Mañana, Bolivia

A fumarole (/ˈfjuːməˌroʊl/; also spelled fumerole) is a vent through the surface of Earth or another terrestrial planet from which hot volcanic gases and vapors are emitted, without any accompanying liquids or solids. Fumaroles are characteristic of the late stages of volcanic activity, but fumarole activity can also precede a volcanic eruption and has been used for eruption prediction. Most fumaroles die down within a few days or weeks of the end of an eruption, but a few are persistent, lasting for decades or longer. An area containing fumaroles is known as a fumarole field.

The predominant vapor emitted by fumaroles is steam, formed by the circulation of groundwater through heated rock. This is typically accompanied by volcanic gases given off by magma cooling deep below the surface. These volcanic gases include sulfur compounds, such as various sulfur oxides and hydrogen sulfide, and sometimes hydrogen chloride, hydrogen fluoride, and other gases. A fumarole that emits significant sulfur compounds is sometimes called a solfatara.

Fumarole activity can break down rock around the vent, while simultaneously depositing sulfur and other minerals. Valuable hydrothermal mineral deposits can form beneath fumaroles. However, active fumaroles can be a hazard due to their emission of hot, poisonous gases.

== Description ==
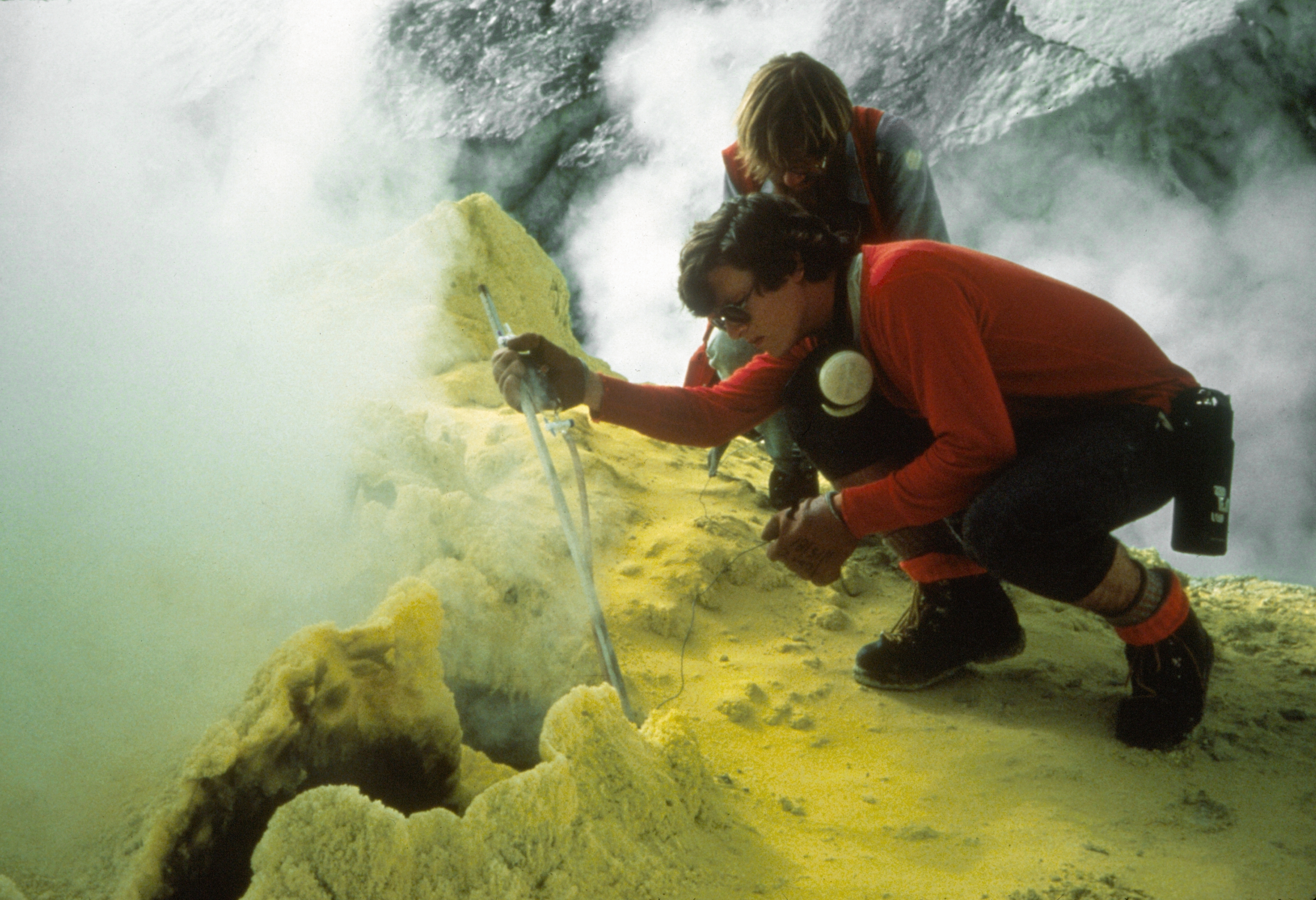
Sampling gases at a fumarole on Mount Baker in Washington, United States

Fumaroles at Vulcano, Sicily, Italy

A fumarole (or fumerole; from French fumerolle, a domed structure with lateral openings, built over a kitchen to permit the escape of smoke) is an opening in a planet's crust which emits steam and gases, but no liquid or solid material. The temperature of the gases leaving the vent ranges from about 100 to 1,000 °C (210 to 1,800 °F). The steam forms when groundwater is superheated by hot rock, then flashes (boils due to depressurization) as it approaches the surface.

In addition to steam, gases released by fumaroles include carbon dioxide, sulfur oxides, hydrogen sulfide, hydrogen chloride, and hydrogen fluoride. These have their origin in magma cooling underground. Not all these gases are present in all fumaroles; for example, fumaroles of Kilauea in Hawaii, US, contain almost no hydrogen chloride or hydrogen fluoride. The gases may also include traces of carbonyl sulfide, carbon disulfide, hydrogen, methane, or carbon monoxide. A fumarole that emits sulfurous gases can be referred to as a solfatara (from old Italian solfo, "sulfur"). Acid-sulfate hot springs can be formed by fumaroles when some of the steam condenses at the surface. Rising acidic vapors from below, such as CO_{2} and H_{2}S, will then dissolve, creating steam-heated low-pH hot springs.

Fumaroles are normally associated with the late stages of volcanic activity, although they may also precede volcanic activity and have been used to predict volcanic eruptions. In particular, changes in the composition and temperature of fumarole gases may point to an imminent eruption. An increase in sulfur oxide emissions is a particularly robust indication that new magma is rising from the depths, and may be detectable months to years before the eruption. Continued sulfur oxide emissions after an eruption is an indication that magma is continuing to rise towards the surface.

Fumaroles may occur along tiny cracks, along long fissures, or in chaotic clusters or fields. They also occur on the surface of lava flows and pyroclastic flows. A fumarole field is an area of thermal springs and gas vents where shallow magma or hot igneous rocks release gases or interact with groundwater. When they occur in freezing environments, fumaroles may cause fumarolic ice towers.

Fumaroles may persist for decades or centuries if located above a persistent heat source; or they may disappear within weeks to months if they occur atop a fresh volcanic deposit that quickly cools. The Valley of Ten Thousand Smokes, for example, was formed during the 1912 eruption of Novarupta in Alaska. Initially, thousands of fumaroles occurred in the cooling ash from the eruption, but over time most of them have become extinct. Persistent fumaroles are found at Sulfur Bank on the northern edge of the Kilauea caldera, but most fumaroles in Hawaii last no more than a few months. There are still numerous active fumaroles at Yellowstone National Park, US, some 70,000 years after the most recent eruption.

== Economic resources and hazards ==
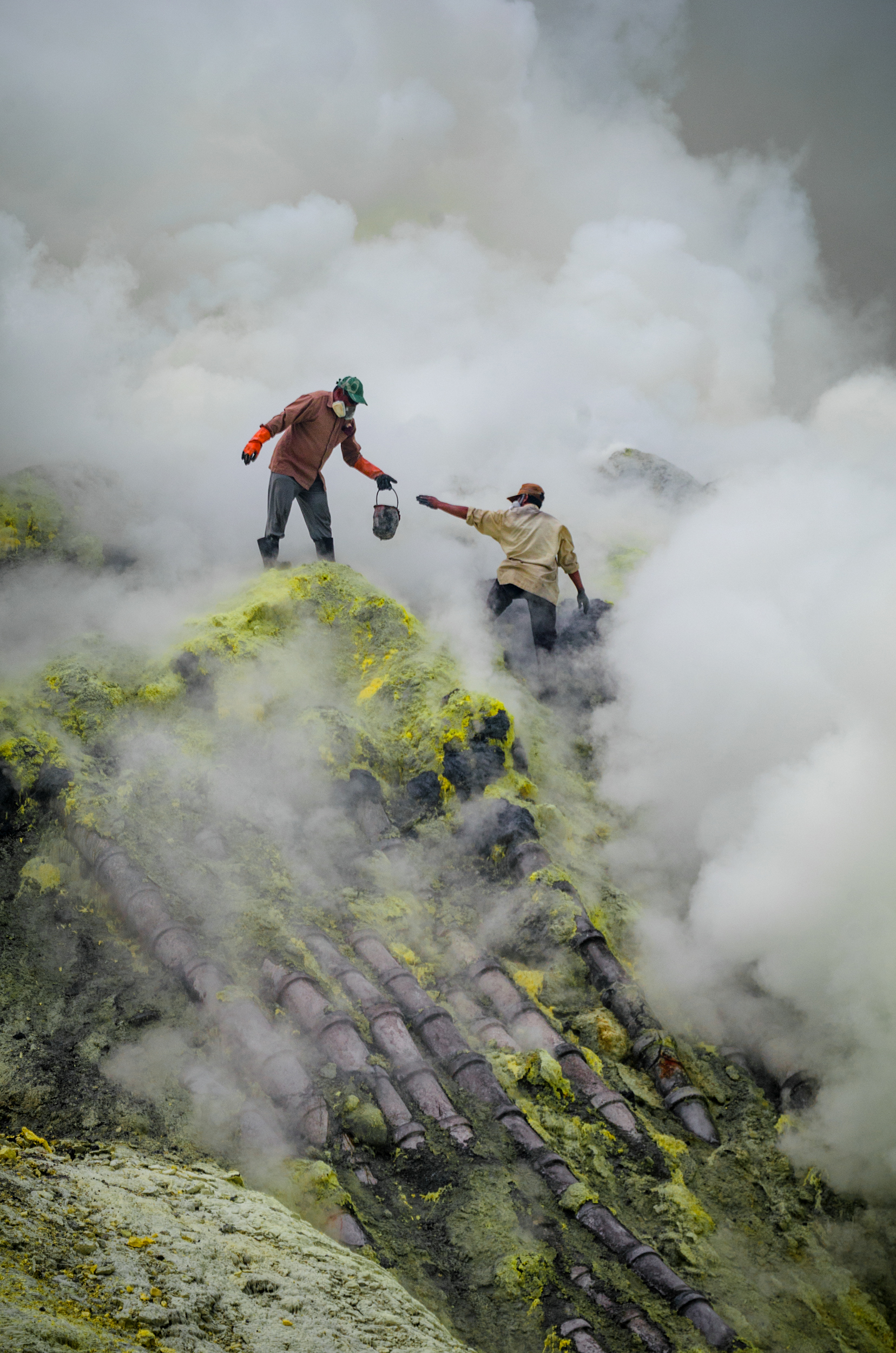
Traditional sulfur mining at Kawah Ijen.

The acidic fumes from fumaroles can break down the rock around the vents, producing brightly colored alteration haloes. At Sulphur Banks near Kilauea in Hawaii, mild alteration reduces the rock to gray to white opal and kaolinite with the original texture of the rock still discernible. Alteration begins along joints in the rock and works inwards until the entire joint block is altered. More extreme alteration (at lower pH) reduces the material to clay minerals and iron oxides to produce red to reddish-brown clay. The same process can produce valuable hydrothermal ore deposits at depth.

Fumaroles emitting sulfurous vapors form surface deposits of sulfur-rich minerals and of fumarole minerals. Sulfur crystals at Sulfur Banks near Kilauea can grow to 2 centimeters (0.8 in) in length, and considerable sulfur has been deposited at Sulfur Cone within Mauna Loa caldera. Places in which these deposits have been mined include:

- Kawah Ijen and Arjuno-Welirang, Indonesia
- Purico Complex near San Pedro de Atacama in Chile
- Mount Tongariro in the central North Island, New Zealand (mined by Māori until 1950)
- Whakaari / White Island in the Bay of Plenty, New Zealand (mined from the 1880s to the 1930s)
- Sicily, which had a near-monopoly on sulfur prior to development of the Frasch process for mining sulfur from salt domes.

Sulfur mining in Indonesia is sometimes done for low pay, by hand, without respirators or other protective equipment.

In April 2006 fumarole emissions killed three ski-patrol workers east of Chair 3 at Mammoth Mountain Ski Area in California. The workers died of an accumulation of toxic fumes (a mazuku) in a crevasse they had fallen into.

== Occurrences ==
Fumaroles are found around the world in areas of volcanic activity. A few notable examples include:

- Campi Flegrei, Italy, known since ancient times and regarded as the entrance to Hell, which is now closely monitored because of the hazard it poses to nearby urbanization.
- Central Volcanic Zone, South America
- Corbetti Caldera, Ethiopia, where a geothermal power station is under construction
- Taupō Volcanic Zone, New Zealand, where fumaroles support a unique and critically endangered ecosystem
- Mount Usu, Japan
- Valley of Desolation in Morne Trois Pitons National Park in Dominica
- Furnas, São Miguel Island, Azores (Portugal)
- Yellowstone National Park has thousands of fumaroles, including Black Growler at Norris Geyser Basin and numerous fumaroles dotting Roaring Mountain.

=== On Mars ===
The formation known as Home Plate at Gusev Crater on Mars, which was examined by the Mars Exploration Rover (MER) Spirit, is suspected to be the eroded remains of an ancient and extinct fumarole.

== See also ==
- Boiling Lake
- Cold seep
- Hydrothermal vent
- Mofetta
- Mudpot
- Mud volcano
