= William C. McCool =

American astronaut (1961–2003)

Willie McCool
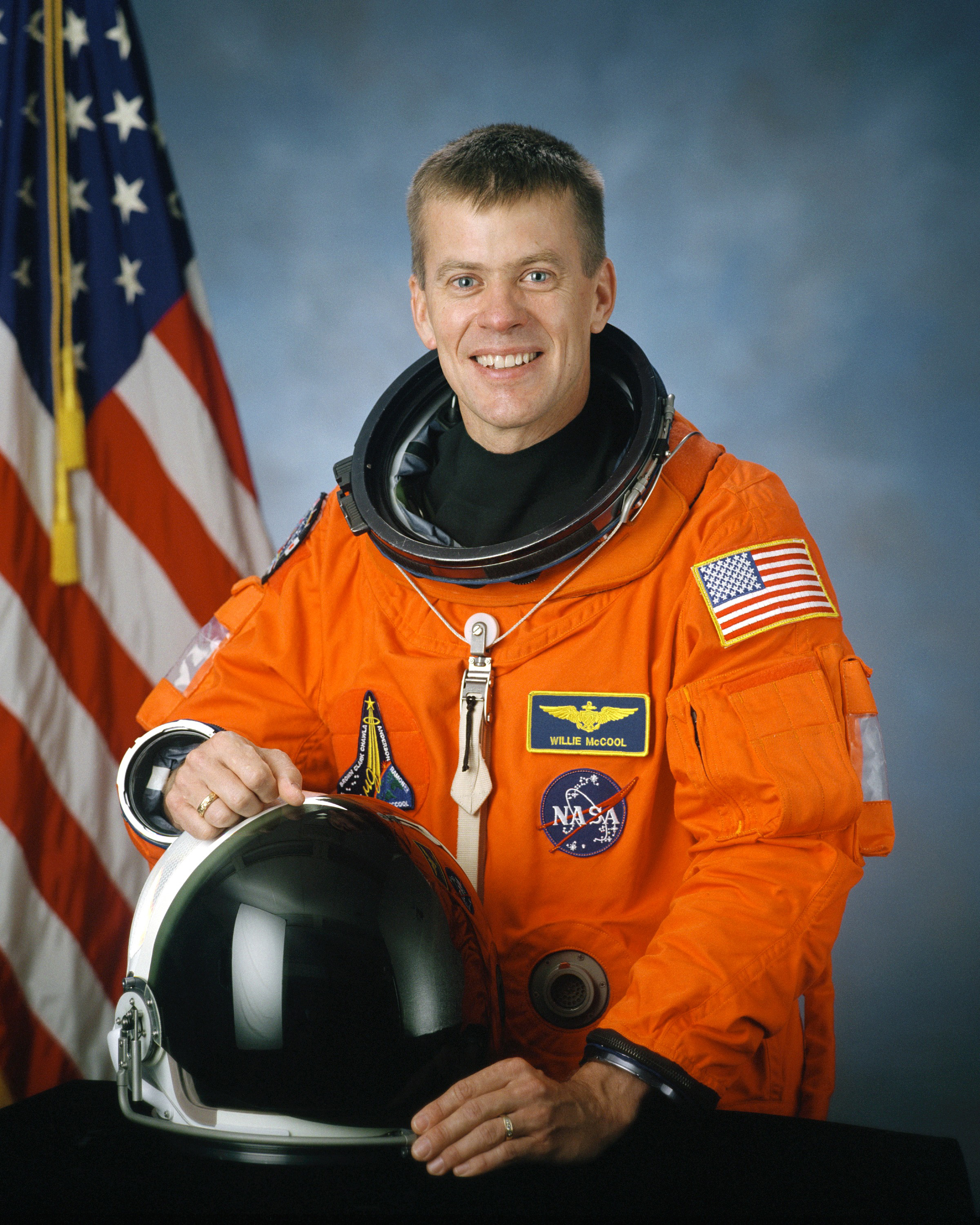
- McCool in 2001
- Born: William Cameron Graham; September 23, 1961; San Diego, California, U.S.
- Died: February 1, 2003 (aged 41); Over Texas, U.S.
- Education: United States Naval Academy (BS); University of Maryland, College Park (MS); Naval Postgraduate School (MS)
- Awards: Congressional Space Medal of Honor; NASA Distinguished Service Medal
- Space career

NASA astronaut
- Rank: Captain, USN
- Time in space: 15d 22h 20m
- Selection: NASA Group 16 (1996)
- Mission: STS-107
- Mission insignia

William Cameron "Willie" McCool (né Graham; September 23, 1961 – February 1, 2003) was an American naval officer and aviator, test pilot, aeronautical engineer, and NASA astronaut, who was the pilot of Space Shuttle Columbia mission STS-107. He and the rest of the crew of STS-107 were killed when Columbia disintegrated during reentry into the atmosphere. McCool was posthumously awarded the Congressional Space Medal of Honor.

== Early life and education ==
McCool was born on September 23, 1961, in San Diego, California. His parents divorced when McCool was young, and in 1969, his mother married Barent McCool, a Naval aviator. McCool was active in the Boy Scouts of America, where he became an Eagle Scout. McCool attended John F. Kennedy High School in Tamuning, Guam from 1967 to 1977. His family relocated to Lubbock, Texas, where he graduated from Coronado High School in 1979.

McCool then enrolled at the United States Naval Academy, where he served as team captain of the U.S. Naval Academy Cross Country team his senior year. He received a Bachelor of Science degree in Applied Science in 1983, graduating second of 1,083 in his class. After graduating, he became a member of the U.S. Naval Academy Alumni Association. McCool received a Master of Science degree in Computer Science from the University of Maryland, College Park in 1985. Six years later, McCool graduated from the United States Naval Test Pilot School, Naval Air Station Patuxent River in Class 101, and he was presented the "Outstanding Student" and "Best DT-II Thesis" awards as a graduate. In 1992, he received a Master of Science in Aeronautical Engineering from the U.S. Naval Postgraduate School.

== Flight experience ==
McCool completed flight training and was designated a Naval Aviator in August 1986. He was assigned to Tactical Electronic Warfare Squadron 129 (VAQ-129) at NAS Whidbey Island, Washington, for initial EA-6B Prowler training. McCool's first operational tour was with Tactical Electronic Warfare Squadron 133 (VAQ-133), where he made two deployments aboard the aircraft carrier USS Coral Sea to the Mediterranean Sea and received designation as a wing-qualified landing signal officer (LSO). In November 1989, McCool was selected for the U.S. Naval Postgraduate School/Test Pilot School (TPS) Cooperative Education Program.

After graduating from TPS in June 1992, McCool worked as a TA-4J and EA-6B test pilot in Flight Systems Department of Strike Aircraft Test Directorate at NAS Patuxent River, Maryland. He was responsible for the management and conduct of a wide variety of projects, ranging from airframe fatigue life studies to numerous avionics upgrades. However, McCool's primary efforts were dedicated to flight test of the Advanced Capability (ADVCAP) EA-6B. Following his Patuxent River tour, McCool returned to Whidbey Island, and was assigned to Tactical Electronic Warfare Squadron 132 (VAQ-132) aboard the carrier USS Enterprise. He served as Administrative and Operations Officer with the squadron through their work-up cycle, receiving notice of his NASA selection while embarked on Enterprise for her final pre-deployment at sea period.

McCool accumulated over 2,800 flight hours in 24 aircraft as well as more than 400 carrier arrestments, also known as "traps".

== NASA experience ==
Selected by NASA in April 1996, McCool reported to the Johnson Space Center the following August. He completed two years of training and evaluation, and was qualified for flight assignment as a pilot. Initially assigned to the Computer Support Branch, McCool also served as technical assistant to the director of flight crew operations, and worked Shuttle cockpit upgrade issues for the Astronaut Office.

=== Spaceflight experience ===
McCool was the pilot of Space Shuttle mission STS-107, January 16 to February 1, 2003, logging 15 days, 22 hours, and 20 minutes in space. The 16-day flight was a dedicated science and research mission. Working 24 hours a day in two alternating shifts, the crew successfully conducted approximately 80 experiments. According to NASA, McCool said of the unique view he and his crewmates had from Columbia:

From our orbital vantage point, we observe an earth without borders, full of peace, beauty and magnificence, and we pray that humanity as a whole can imagine a borderless world as we see it and strive to live as one in peace.

— William Cameron McCool, 29 January 2003 onboard Columbia

STS-107's mission ended abruptly on February 1, 2003, when Space Shuttle Columbia broke up over the southern United States during re-entry, 16 minutes before scheduled landing. All seven crew members were killed.

McCool was posthumously awarded the NASA Space Flight Medal, the NASA Distinguished Service Medal, the Defense Distinguished Service Medal (DDSM), and the Congressional Space Medal of Honor.

== Personal life ==
McCool's favorite song was "Imagine" by John Lennon, which was played during the STS-107 mission. His favorite band was Radiohead, and the song "Fake Plastic Trees" was played by Mission Control as a wake-up call.

McCool was survived by his wife, Lani, and their three sons. McCool was a convert to Roman Catholicism. McCool is buried in Anacortes, Washington, where he lived at the time of his death.

== Honors ==
- Awarded Navy Commendation Medal (2)
- Awarded Navy Achievement Medal (2)
- Posthumously promoted to Captain by Secretary of the Navy Carlos Del Toro October 7, 2023

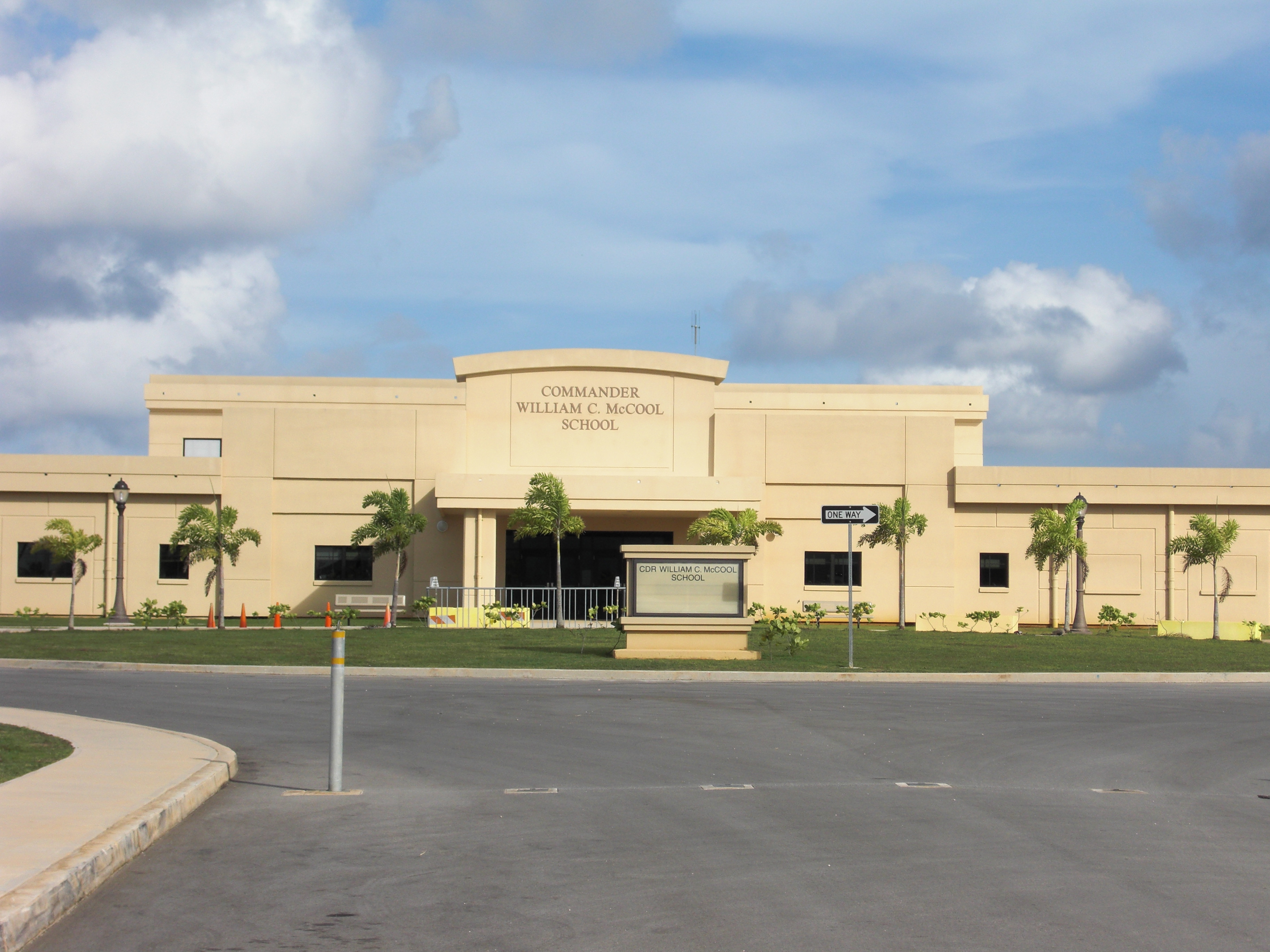
Commander William C. McCool School in Sånta Rita-Sumai, Guam

- Asteroid 51829 Williemccool was posthumously named for McCool.
- Lunar crater McCool is named after him.
- McCool Hill in the Columbia Hills on Mars was posthumously named for McCool.
- McCool Hall, in the Columbia Village apartments at the Florida Institute of Technology, is named after him.
- Guam South Elementary/Middle School, a DoDEA school in Santa Rita, Guam, was renamed CDR William C. McCool Elementary/Middle School on August 29, 2003.
- Willie McCool Track and Field at Coronado High School in Lubbock, Texas, was posthumously named for McCool.
- Willie McCool Memorial with Bronze Sculpture was dedicated on Saturday, May 7, 2005, at Huneke Park at 82nd and Quaker Avenue in Lubbock, Texas.
- Commander William C. McCool Academy, opened in the fall of 2020, is a STEM middle school in Lubbock Texas
- The William McCool Science Center, located on the campus of the Frank Lamping Elementary School in Henderson, Nevada, is a facility where elementary students throughout the Clark County School District have an opportunity to learn about space and other fields of science.
- A Gawad Kalinga village in Moncada, Tarlac, Philippines, will be named "USN Commander Willie McCool GK Village".
- In the Star Trek book Mirror Universe – Glass Empires, the shuttlecraft of the U.S.S. Defiant in the short story "Age of the Empress" is named the McCool.
- McCool Track at the Naval Academy Preparatory School, Naval Station Newport, Rhode Island is named after him.
- The spacefaring game Elite: Dangerous contains a starport in the Jaroua system named "McCool City".
- The Willie McCool Monument was dedicated on December 2, 2007, at the U.S. Naval Academy Golf Course. The monument stands where Willie would have been 16 minutes from the finish line during his fastest race on Navy's home course.
- The Willie McCool Memorial Model Air Field park located in North Las Vegas, Nevada was posthumously named for McCool on October 23, 2004.
- McCool Hall, located on Tinker AFB, Oklahoma is a Navy Bachelors Enlisted Quarters named after McCool.
- Camp McCool, located in Bagram Airfield, was the home of rotating EA-6B Prowler Squadrons supporting ISAF in Afghanistan.
- The FAA named a Fix/Waypoint MCCUL near Naval Air Station Whidbey Island (also near Anacortes, WA) located at 48 13.11N, 123 07.03W. Navy pilots are routinely vectored to the McCool waypoint.
- The McCool Breakthrough Award is named after Willie McCool and is given to an individual who has made a significant breakthrough in the spirit of ICHRIE's mission.
- The Commander William C. McCool Academy is Lubbock ISD’s newest magnet middle school.

== See also ==
- List of Eagle Scouts
- List of spaceflight-related accidents and incidents
- Space Shuttle Columbia disaster
