= Rick Husband =

American astronaut (1957–2003)

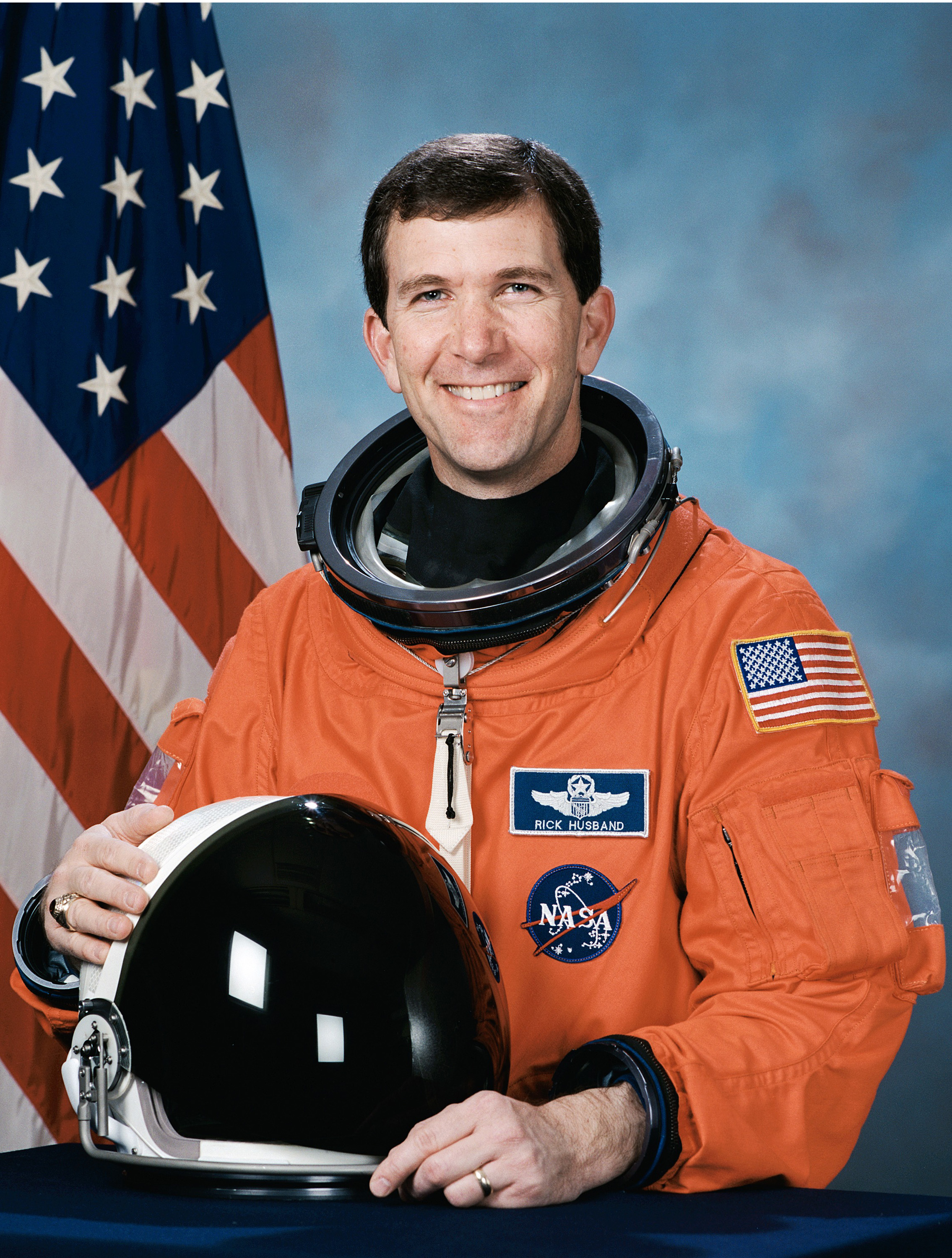
- Official portrait, 1999
- Born: Rick Douglas Husband; July 12, 1957; Amarillo, Texas, U.S.
- Died: February 1, 2003 (aged 45); Over Texas, U.S.
- Cause of death: Space Shuttle Columbia disaster
- Education: Texas Tech University (BS); California State University, Fresno (MS)
- Awards: Congressional Space Medal of Honor; NASA Distinguished Service Medal
- Space career

NASA astronaut
- Rank: Colonel, USAF
- Time in space: 25d 17h 33m
- Selection: NASA Group 15 (1994)
- Missions: STS-96; STS-107
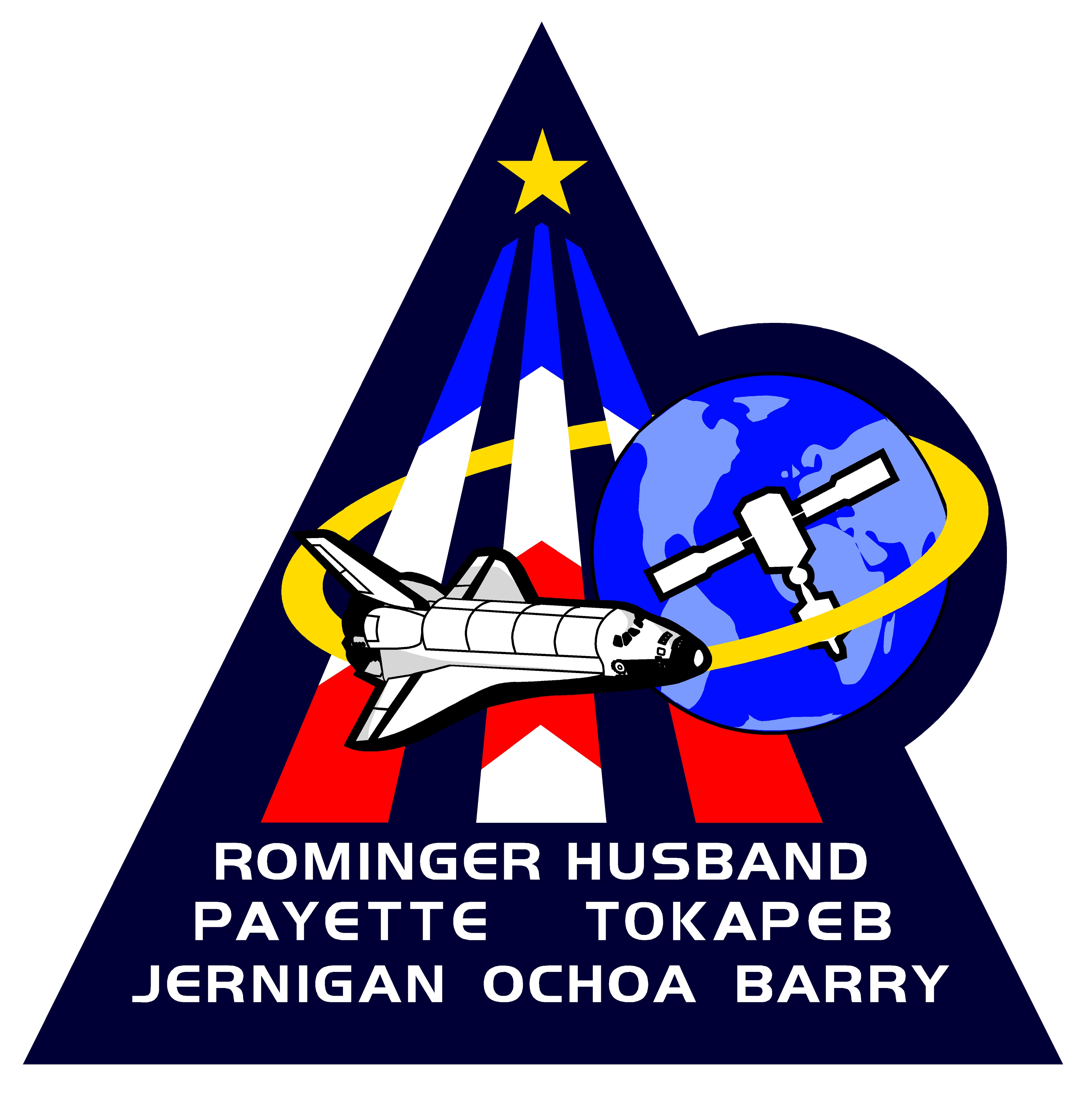
- Mission insignia

Rick Douglas Husband (July 12, 1957 – February 1, 2003) was an American astronaut and fighter pilot. He traveled into space twice: as pilot of STS-96 and commander of STS-107. Husband and the rest of the crew of STS-107 were killed when Columbia disintegrated during reentry into the Earth's atmosphere. He is also a recipient of the Congressional Space Medal of Honor.

== Early life, education and training ==
Husband was born on July 12, 1957, in Amarillo, Texas. At age 17, he earned his pilot's license while flying out of Tradewind Airport. Husband graduated with honors from Amarillo High School in 1975.

Husband earned a Bachelor of Science degree in mechanical engineering from Texas Tech University in 1980 after five years of study. He earned his Master of Science degree from Fresno State University. Upon graduation, Husband was commissioned as a pilot in the United States Air Force, having been enrolled in ROTC his last two years of college. Husband underwent pilot training at Vance Air Force Base, in Enid, Oklahoma. This was followed by Land Survival School at Fairchild Air Force Base, in Spokane, Washington, and Fighter Lead-in School in New Mexico. After he got married on February 27, 1982, Husband trained in the F-4 at Homestead Air Force Base next.

== U.S. Air Force career ==
Husband was assigned to a squadron at Moody Air Force Base in Valdosta, Georgia, flying the F-4E. He then transferred to George AFB, in Victorville, California in December 1985, where Husband became an F-4 instructor. By then, he had accumulated 1000 hours of flying time.

In December 1987, Husband was assigned to Edwards Air Force Base in California, where he attended the USAF Test Pilot School class 88A along with future Canadian Space Agency astronaut Chris Hadfield. Upon completion of test pilot school, Husband served as a test pilot flying the F-4 and all five models of the F-15 Eagle. In the F-15 Combined Test Force, he was the program manager for the Pratt & Whitney F100-PW-229 increased performance engine and also served as the F-15 Aerial Demonstration Pilot.

In June 1992, Husband was assigned to the Aircraft and Armament Evaluation Establishment at Boscombe Down, England, as an exchange test pilot with the Royal Air Force. At Boscombe Down, he was the Tornado GR1 and GR4 Project Pilot and served as a test pilot in the Hawk, Hunter, Buccaneer, Jet Provost, Tucano, and Harvard.

Husband logged over 3,800 hours of flight time in more than 40 different types of aircraft.

== NASA career ==
Husband was selected as an astronaut candidate by NASA in December 1994, the same week he was promoted to lieutenant colonel. Husband reported to the Johnson Space Center in March 1995 to begin a year of training and evaluation. Upon completion of training, he was named the Astronaut Office representative for Advanced Projects at Johnson Space Center, working on Space Shuttle Upgrades, the Crew Return Vehicle (CRV) and studies to return to the Moon and travel to Mars. Husband eventually served as Chief of Safety for the Astronaut Office. In 1999, he flew as pilot on STS-96 and logged 235 hours and 13 minutes in space. Husband was later assigned to command the crew of STS-107, which was launched early in 2003. Along with the rest of the STS-107 crew, he was killed upon reentry when the shuttle disintegrated over Texas.

== Shuttle missions ==
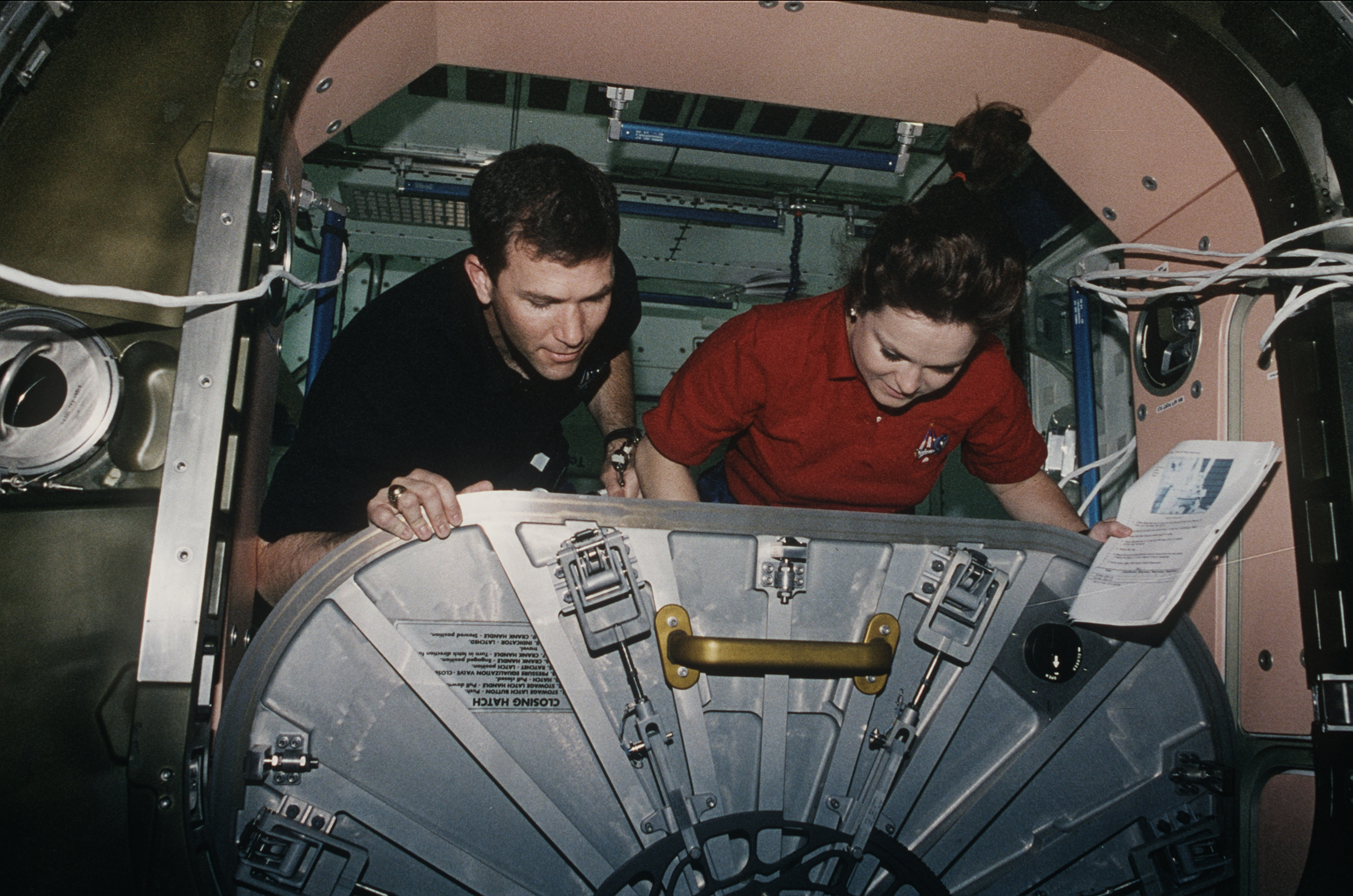
Pilot (PLT) Rick D. Husband (left) and EVA Specialist Tamara E. Jernigan (right) during STS-96

- STS-96 (May 27 to June 6, 1999) aboard the Space Shuttle Discovery was a 10-day mission during which the crew performed the first docking with the International Space Station and delivered four tons of logistics and supplies in preparation for the arrival of the first crew to live on the station early the following year. The mission was accomplished in 153 Earth orbits, traveling 4 million miles in 9 days, 19 hours and 13 minutes.

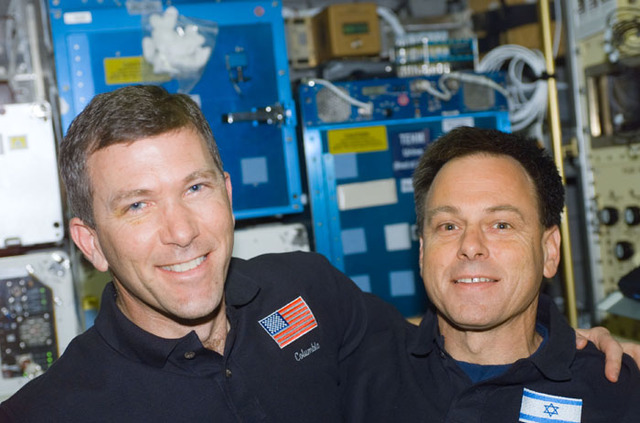
Commander (CDR) Rick D. Husband (left) and Payload Specialist (PS) Ilan Ramon (right) during STS-107

- STS-107 (January 16 to February 1, 2003) aboard the Space Shuttle Columbia was a 16-day mission during which the crew performed over 80 experiments testing applications of microgravity to gain insight into the environment of space and improve life on Earth as well as enable future space exploration. The mission ended on the morning of February 1 when the shuttle disintegrated upon reentry killing all crew members, including Husband (see Space Shuttle Columbia disaster).

== Awards and decorations ==
US Air Force Command Astronaut Badge

Defense Distinguished Service Medal (posthumous)
Meritorious Service Medal with two bronze oak leaf clusters
Aerial Achievement Medal
Air Force Commendation Medal
Congressional Space Medal of Honor (posthumous)
NASA Distinguished Service Medal (posthumous)
NASA Space Flight Medal (posthumous)
National Defense Service Medal
Air Force Longevity Service Award with two oak leaf clusters
Air Force Training Ribbon

Two NASA Group Achievement Awards.

== Tributes ==
- Husband Hall, in the Columbia Village apartments, at the Florida Institute of Technology.
- Husband Mission, one of the projects in the educational SpaceLab Program, run by the Ramon Foundation in memory of Ilan Ramon. Involves the writing of new Wikipedia entries on a variety of space and STEM related topics.
- Husband Hill, one of the Columbia Hills on Mars.
- Asteroid 51823 Rickhusband.
- Rick Husband Amarillo International Airport, in his hometown of Amarillo, Texas.
- Husband Auditorium, Squadron Officer School building, Maxwell AFB, Alabama.
- Rick Husband Boulevard Howardwick, Texas.
- Rick Husband Drive, El Paso, Texas.
- Husband-Boeing Engineering Honors Program at California State University, Fresno
- S.S. Rick Husband, the Cygnus CRS OA-6 uncrewed resupply spacecraft.
- The lunar crater Husband is named after Husband.

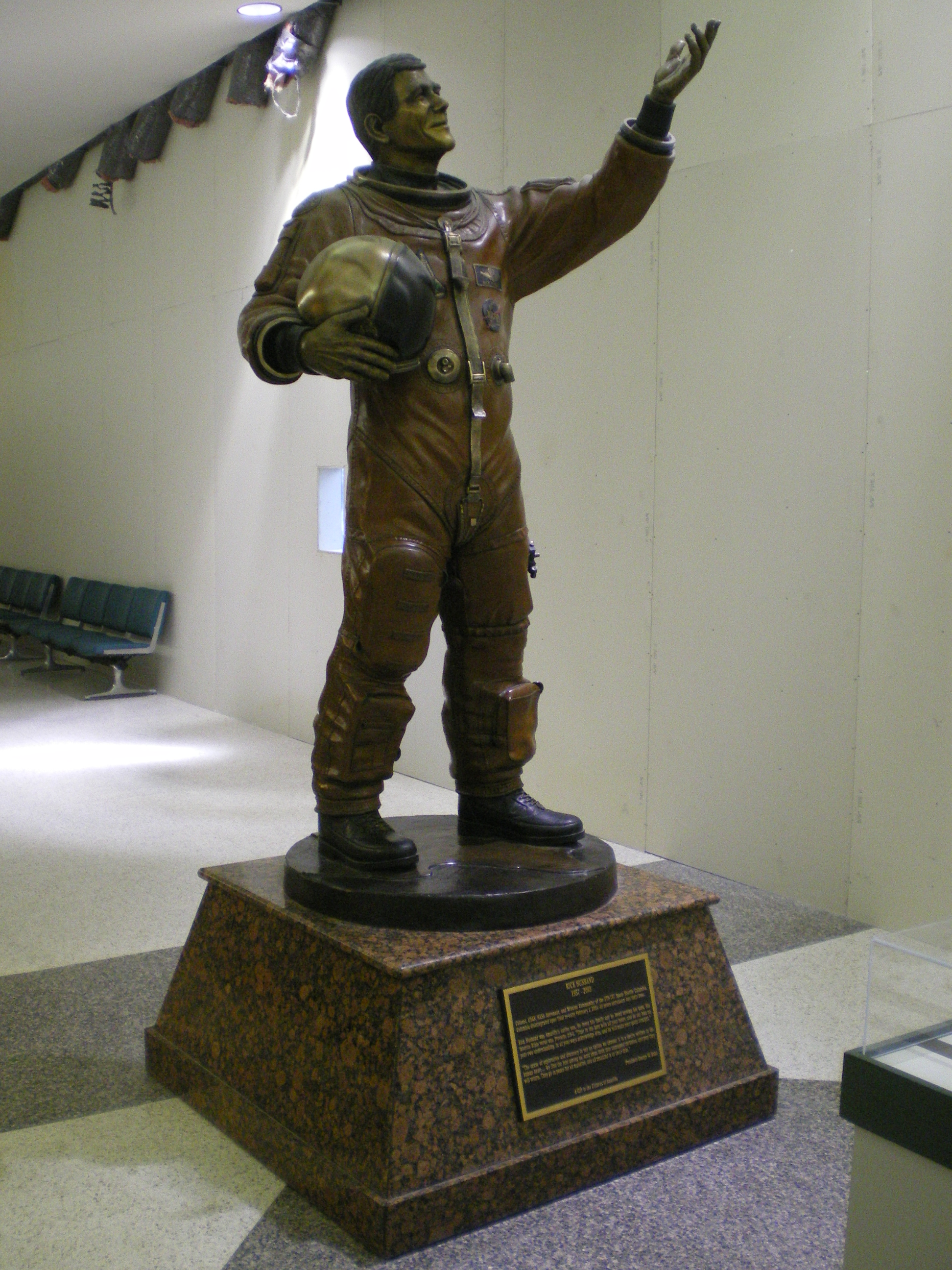
Statue of Rick Husband at Amarillo International Airport

== Personal life ==
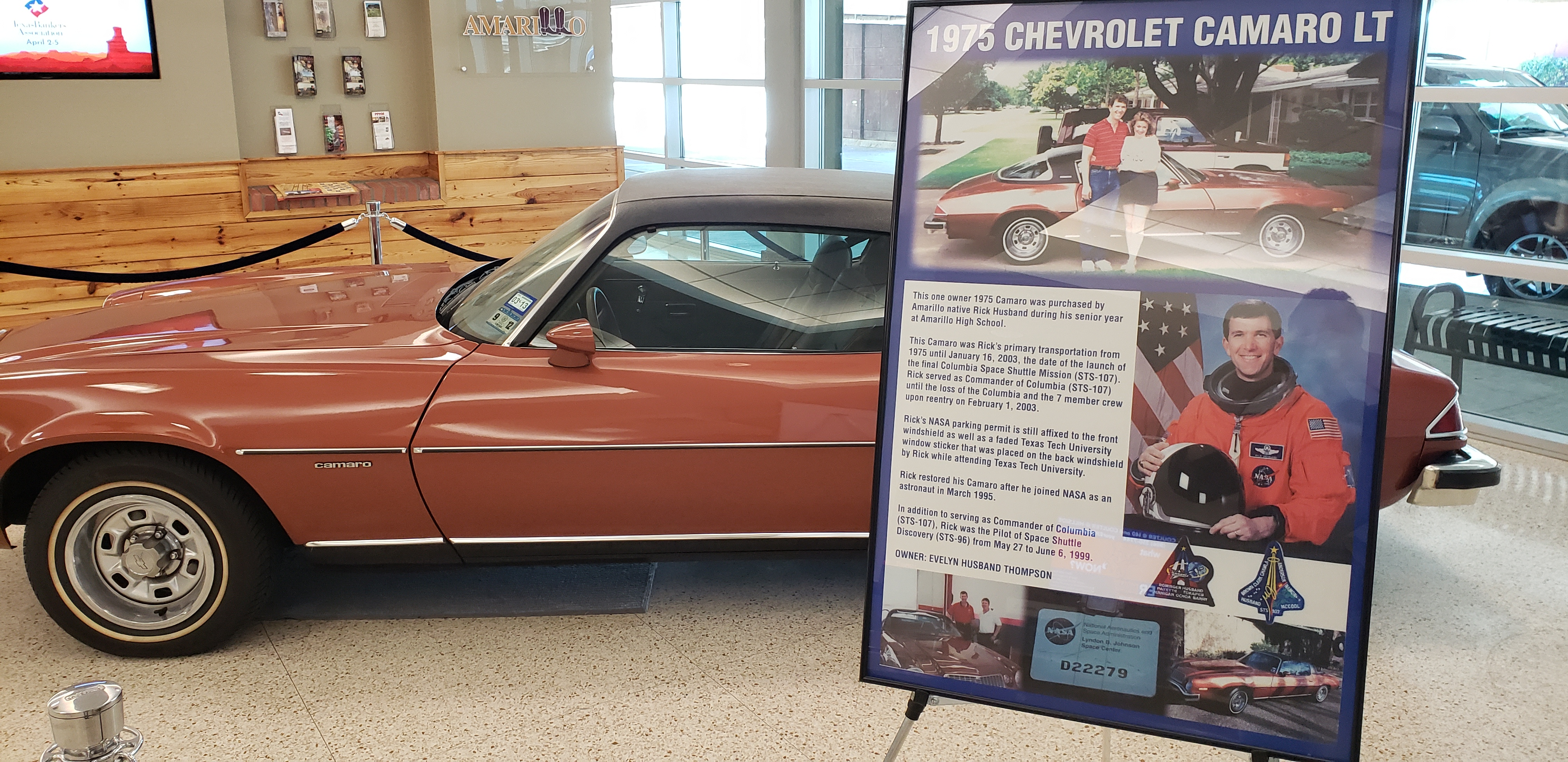
Husband's Camaro on display at Rick Husband Amarillo International Airport

Husband's wife, Evelyn (born September 18, 1958), details her Christian life with Rick and his struggles to fulfill his lifelong dream to become an astronaut in the 2004 book High Calling: The Courageous Life and Faith of Space Shuttle Columbia Commander Rick Husband co-written with Donna VanLiere. They had two children together: Laura Marie (born October 5, 1990) and Matthew (born August 3, 1995). Evelyn married Bill Thompson in January 2008 and was the keynote speaker for the memorial ceremony at the Astronaut Memorial "Space Mirror" at the Kennedy Space Center in Florida, five years after the Space Shuttle Columbia tragedy.

== In popular culture ==
- American actor Brian David portrayed Rick Husband in the American TV series Seconds from Disaster Season 2: Episode 1 (2005) called "Space Shuttle Columbia".

== See also ==
- Space science
