= Apollo 1 Hills =

Hills on Mars

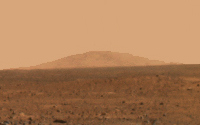
Grissom Hill

The Apollo 1 Hills are three hills on Mars named to memorialize the crew of Apollo 1. The three hills were some of the first landmarks sighted following the January 7, 2004, landing of the Spirit rover on Mars.

== Background ==
NASA astronauts Gus Grissom, Roger Chaffee, and Ed White perished in a flash fire which engulfed their command module on January 27, 1967, while training for the first of the crewed Apollo missions, initially designated as Apollo Saturn-204 (AS-204). Their capsule stood atop the Saturn-1B rocket which was at the time docked to the launchpad gantry at Cape Canaveral's Launch Complex 34, while they performed an in-capsule training for what was to be a low Earth orbit shake-out mission for the United States' Apollo Space Program. The craft was set to launch three weeks later, on February 21, 1967. Following the fire, the mission was renamed Apollo 1 to honor the crew's work.

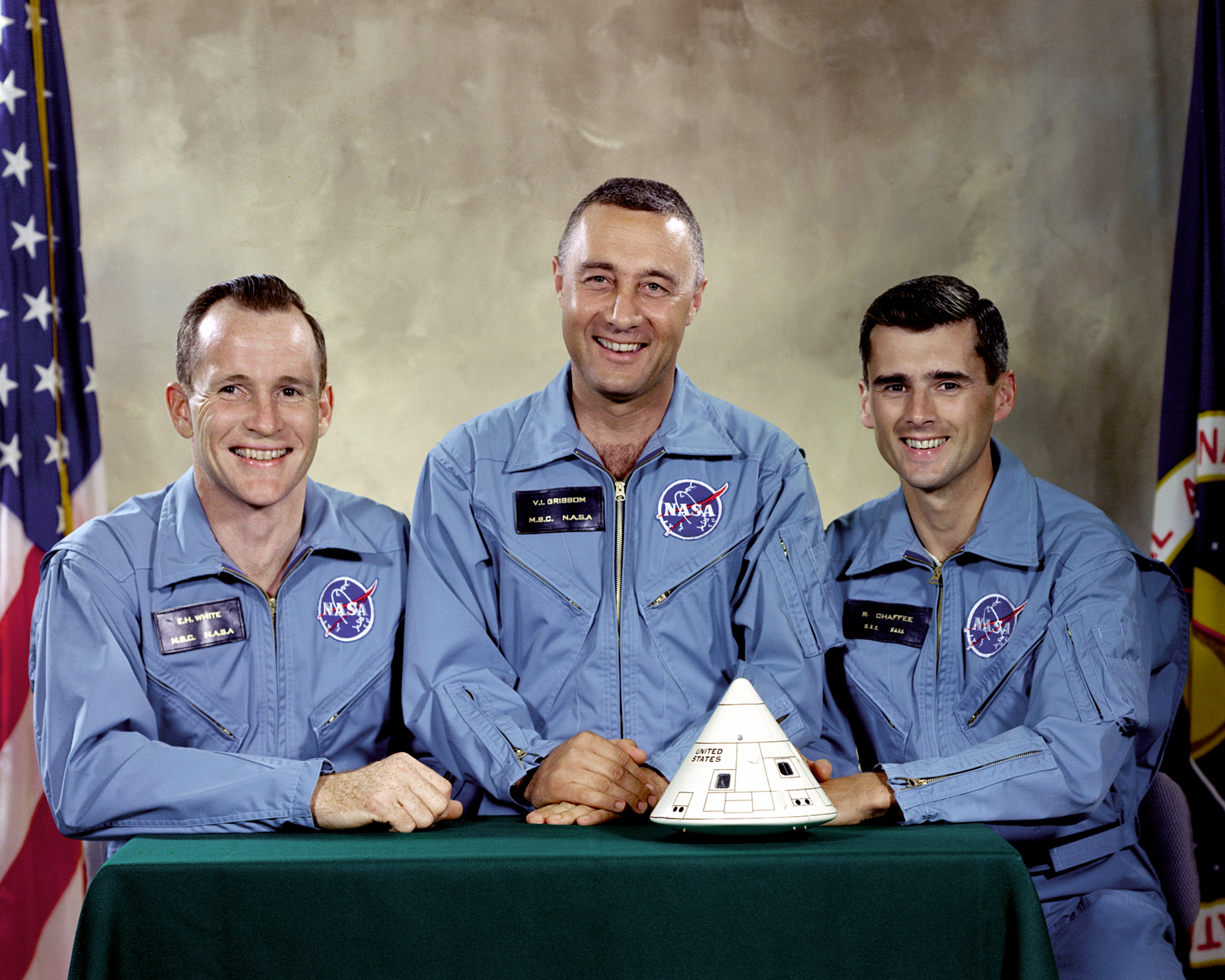
The memorialized crew (l to r: White, Grissom, Chaffee)

Mission Command Pilot Grissom had flown in both Mercury and Gemini programs. Chaffee, at 31, was the youngest member of the astronaut corp ever chosen and was prepping for his first flight. White had been the first American to perform a spacewalk during the Gemini program.

== Location ==
The three vastly separated hills are located in the Gusev crater, part of the Aeolis quadrangle on Mars. They were photographed from Spirit's landing site, designated as the Columbia Memorial Station, shortly after the descent and soft landing on the Martian surface of the rover. The Columbia station and the nearby Columbia Hills are themselves named in honor of the seven crew members of the fatal Columbia spacecraft breakup.

The hills are named in memory of the three Apollo 1 astronauts. Grissom Hill is located 7.5 km (4.7 mi) southwest of the Columbia Memorial Station (at Martian co-ordinates 14.5718°S 175.4785°E); while 11.2 km (7.0 mi) to the northwest lies White Hill; and Chaffee Hill is located 14.3 km (8.9 mi) south-southwest of the station. As of January 2020, however, the International Astronomical Union has not officially designated the hills with the names of the astronauts.

"Through recorded history, explorers have had both the honor and responsibility of naming significant landmarks. Gus, Ed, and Roger's contributions, as much as their sacrifice, helped make our giant leap for mankind possible … as America strides towards our next giant leap, NASA, and the Mars Exploration Rover team created a fitting tribute to these brave explorers and their legacy." – written statement by former NASA Administrator, Sean O'Keefe

== Panoramic view ==
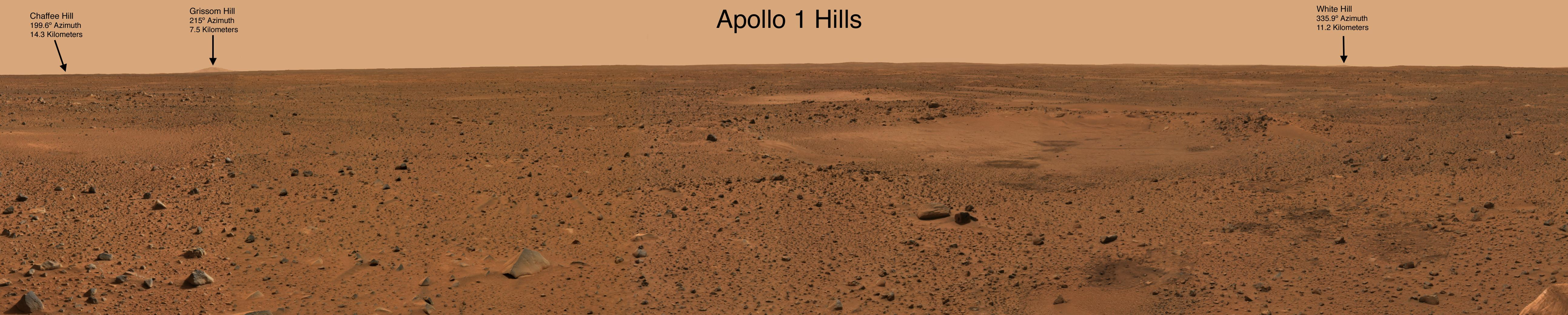
Apollo Hills panorama from the MER-A landing site

== See also ==
- Geography of Mars
