= Gusev (Martian crater) =

Crater on Mars

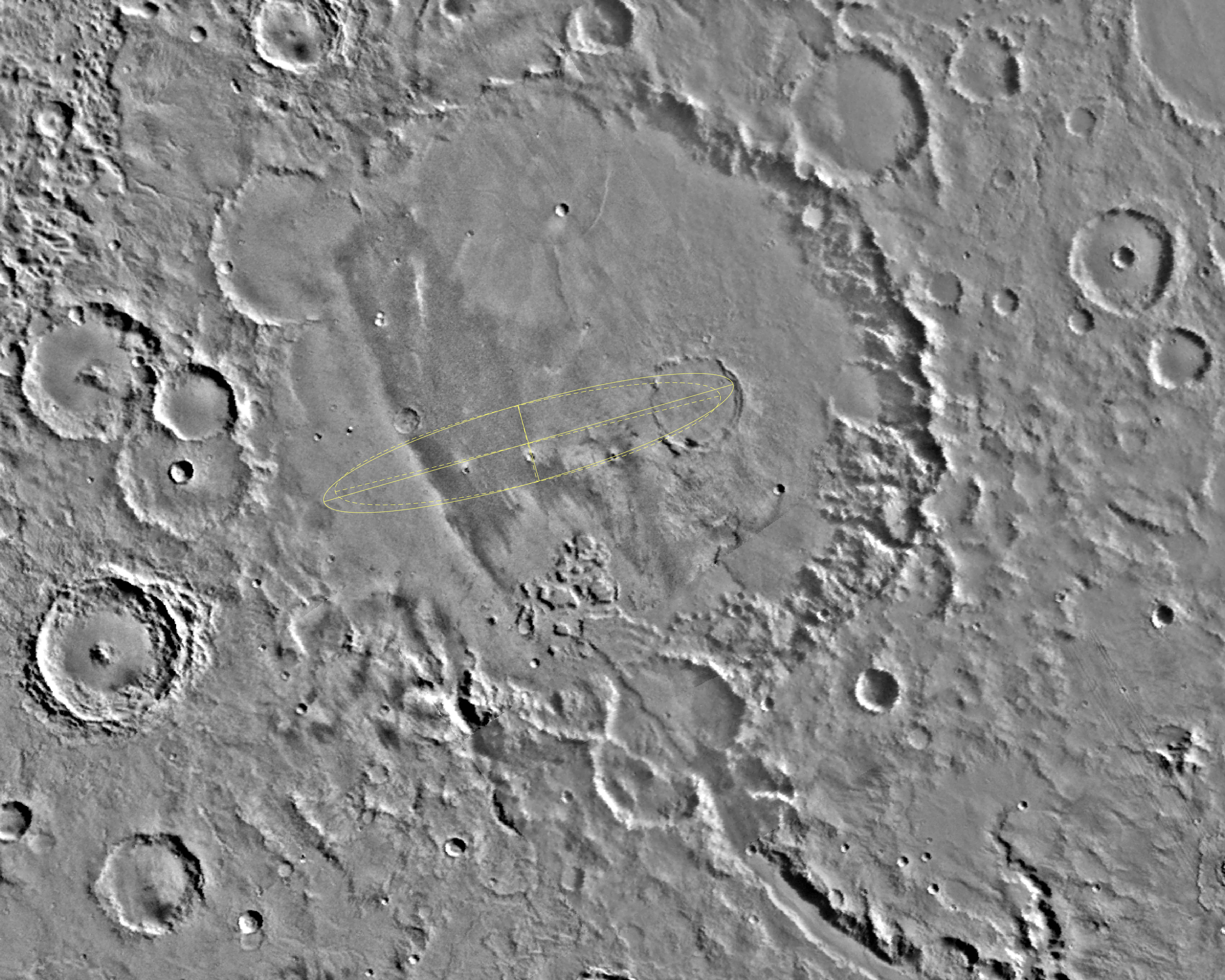
- The Martian crater Gusev, with Ma'adim Vallis snaking into it
- Planet: Mars
- Region: Aeolis quadrangle
- Coordinates: 14.5°S 175.4°E
- Quadrangle: Aeolis
- Diameter: 166 km
- Eponym: Matvey Gusev

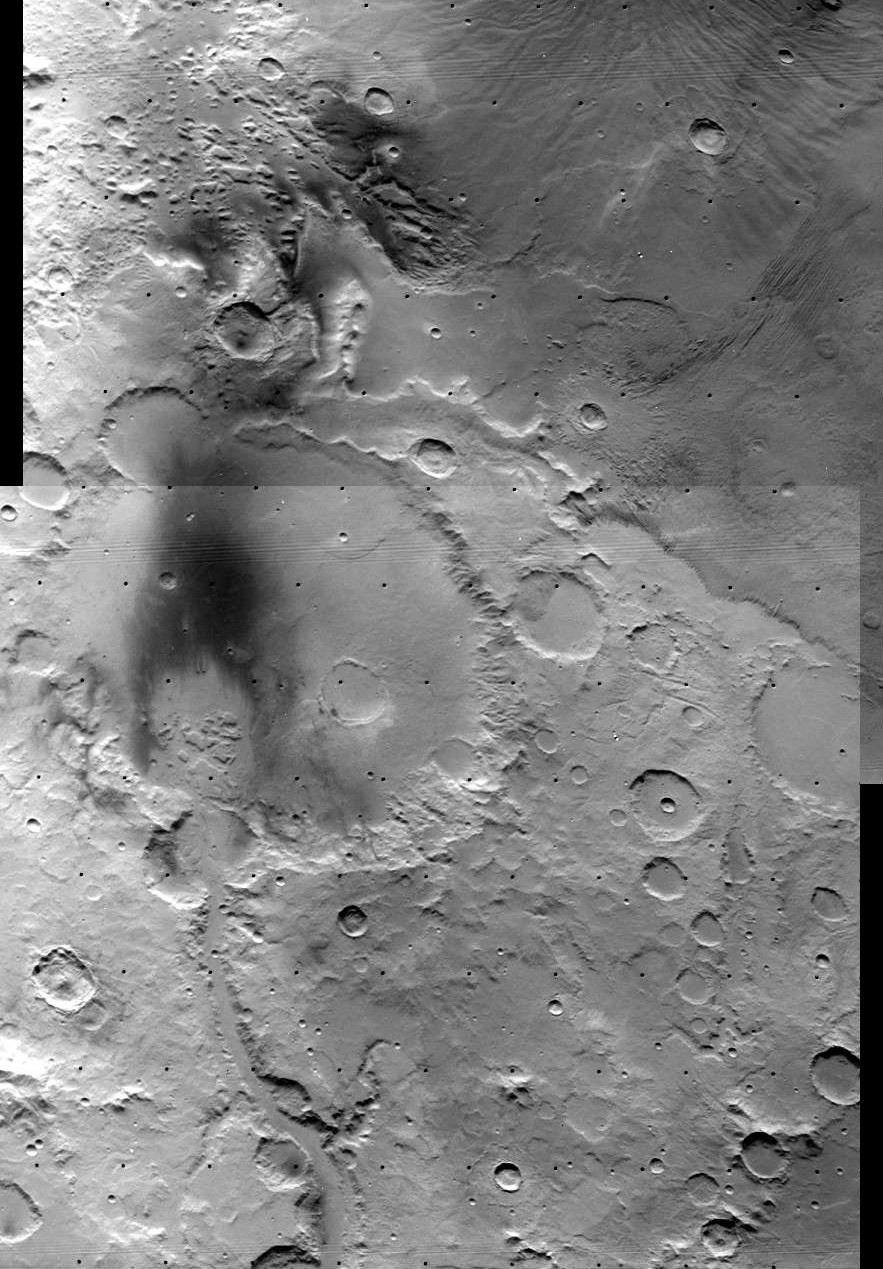
Viking Orbiter 1 mosaic of Gusev crater and vicinity including Ma'adim Vallis

Gusev is a crater on the planet Mars and is located at 14.5°S 175.4°E and is in the Aeolis quadrangle. The crater is about 166 kilometers in diameter and formed approximately three to four billion years ago. It was named after Russian astronomer Matvey Gusev (1826–1866) in 1976.

Prior to the exploration of the crater by the Spirit Rover, the crater was postulated to be an ancient lakebed with Ma'adim Vallis draining into it, of volcaniclastic origin, or a combination of both. These interpretations were based on Viking orbiter imagery, MOC imagery, THEMIS thermal mapping, and MOLA elevation mapping. However, Spirit did not find any lacustrine deposits, instead Spirit found alkaline volcanic rocks, including olivine basalt, comminuted basaltic debris, lavas, and pyroclastic rocks, but no eruption centers.

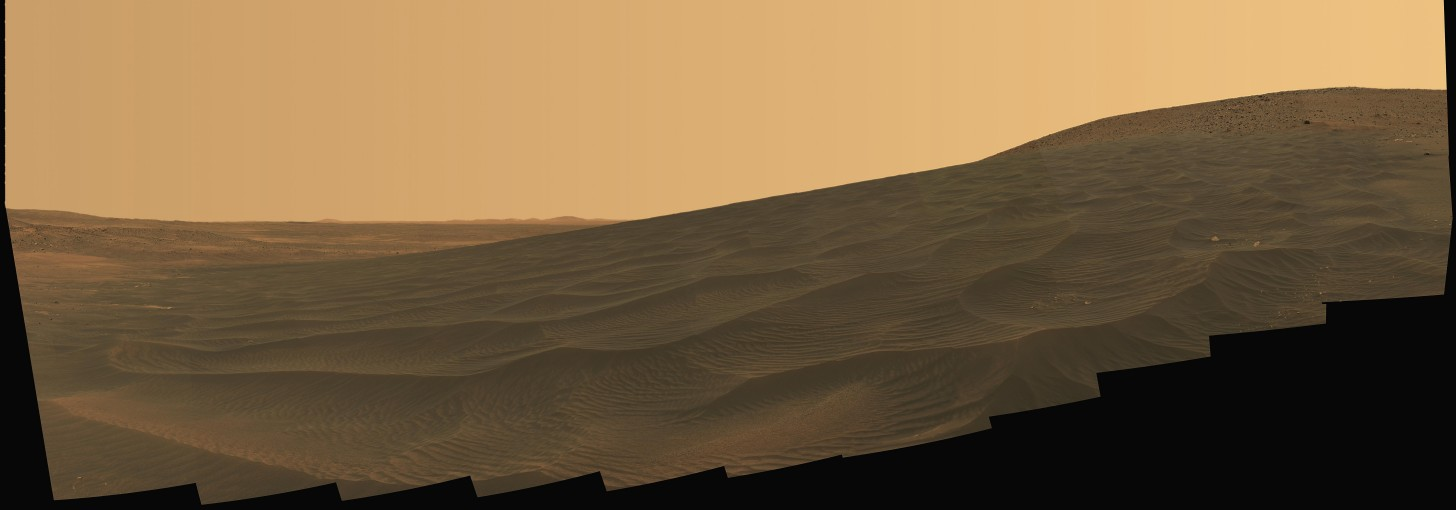
Panoramic photo taken by Spirit Rover on January 1, 2006 from the crater Gusev, looking up a slope and across rippled sand deposits in a dark field dubbed "El Dorado".

More recently, satellite images showed the trails of dust devils on Gusev's floor. The Spirit rover later photographed dust devils from the ground, and likely owes much of its longevity to dust devils cleaning its solar panels.

On January 3, 2004, Gusev was the landing site of the first of NASA's two Mars Exploration Rovers, named Spirit. It was hoped that the numerous smaller and more recent craters in this region would have exposed sedimentary material from early eras, although at first the region proved disappointing in its lack of available bedrock for study on the flat lava plains of the crater. It eventually arrived at the Columbia Hills, however, and rocks examined in that region showed evidence of small amounts of briny (salty) water interacting with them in ancient times, although not nearly as much as at Meridiani Planum, the landing area for Spirit's twin, Opportunity. In 2009, Spirit became stuck in the soil of the region, and in 2010 went offline after a harsh Martian winter. Gusev was also considered a potential landing site for the Mars 2020 Perseverance rover.

== Spirit Rover's rocks and minerals discoveries on Mars ==
The rocks on the plains of Gusev are a type of basalt. They contain the minerals olivine, pyroxene, plagioclase, and magnetite, and they look like volcanic basalt as they are fine-grained with irregular holes (geologists would say they have vesicles and vugs). Much of the soil on the plains came from the breakdown of the local rocks. Fairly high levels of nickel were found in some soils; probably from meteorites. Analysis shows that the rocks have been slightly altered by tiny amounts of water. Outside coatings and cracks inside the rocks suggest water deposited minerals, maybe bromine compounds. All the rocks contain a fine coating of dust and one or more harder rinds of material. One type can be brushed off, while another needed to be ground off by the Rock Abrasion Tool (RAT).

There are a variety of rocks in the Columbia Hills (Mars), some of which have been altered by water, but not by very much water.

The dust in Gusev Crater is the same as dust all around the planet. All the dust was found to be magnetic. Moreover, Spirit found the magnetism was caused by the mineral magnetite, especially magnetite that contained the element titanium. One magnet was able to completely divert all dust hence all Martian dust is thought to be magnetic. The spectra of the dust was similar to spectra of bright, low thermal inertia regions like Tharsis and Arabia that have been detected by orbiting satellites. A thin layer of dust, maybe less than one millimeter thick covers all surfaces. Something in it contains a small amount of chemically bound water.

=== Plains ===
Observations of rocks on the plains show they contain the minerals pyroxene, olivine, plagioclase, and magnetite. These rocks can be classified in different ways. The amounts and types of minerals make the rocks primitive basalts—also called picritic basalts. The rocks are similar to ancient terrestrial rocks called basaltic komatiites. Rocks of the plains also resemble the basaltic shergottites, meteorites that came from Mars. One classification system compares the amount of alkali elements to the amount of silica on a graph; in this system, Gusev plains rocks lie near the junction of basalt, picrobasalt, and tephrite. The Irvine-Barager classification calls them basalts. Plain's rocks have been very slightly altered, probably by thin films of water because they are softer and contain veins of light-colored material that may be bromine compounds, as well as coatings or rinds. It is thought that small amounts of water may have gotten into cracks inducing mineralization processes. Coatings on the rocks may have occurred when rocks were buried and interacted with thin films of water and dust. It was noted that these rocks were easier to grind compared to their Earth counterparts.

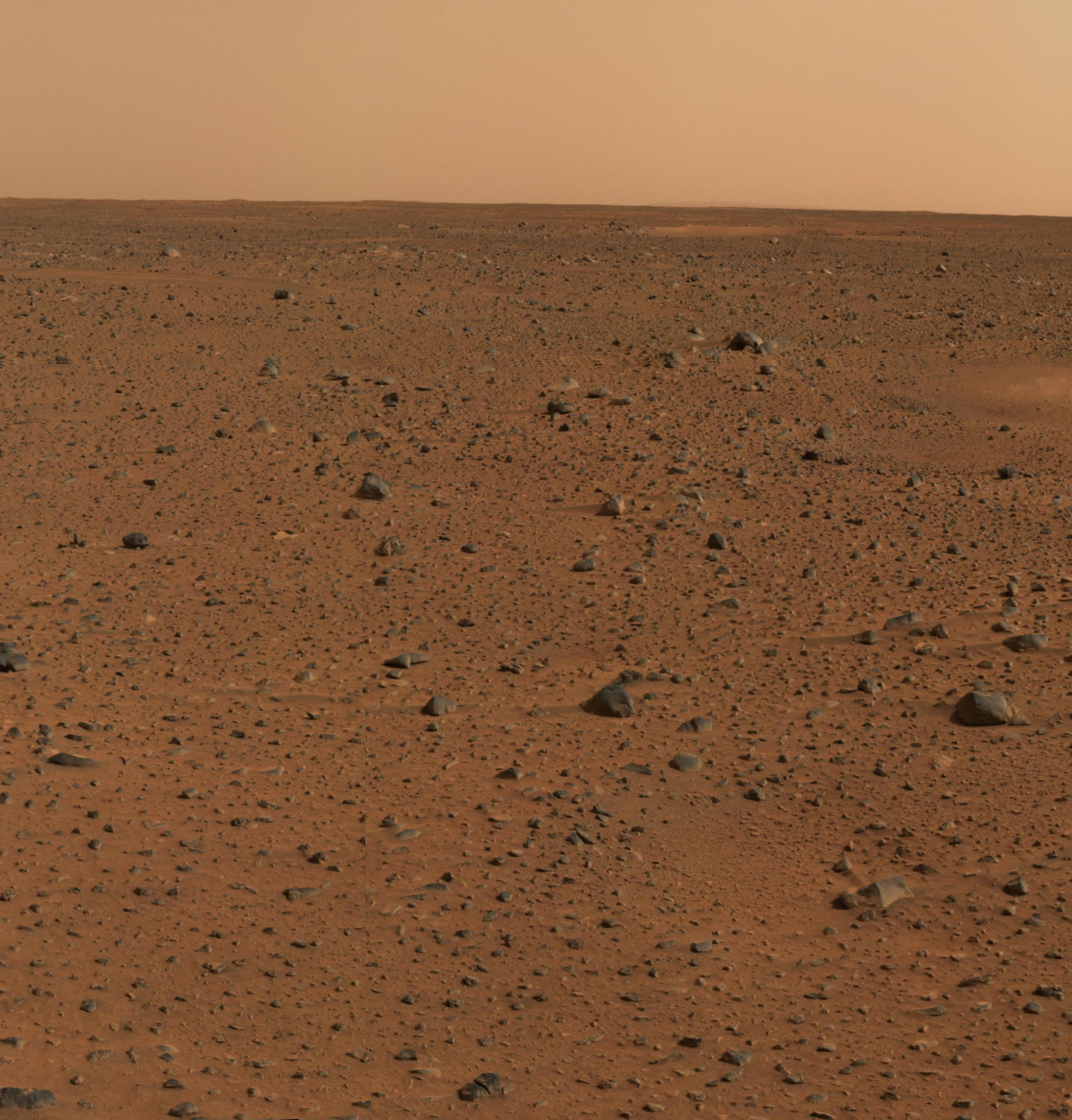
First color picture from Gusev crater. Rocks were found to be basalt. Everything was covered with a fine dust that Spirit determined was magnetic because of the mineral magnetite.

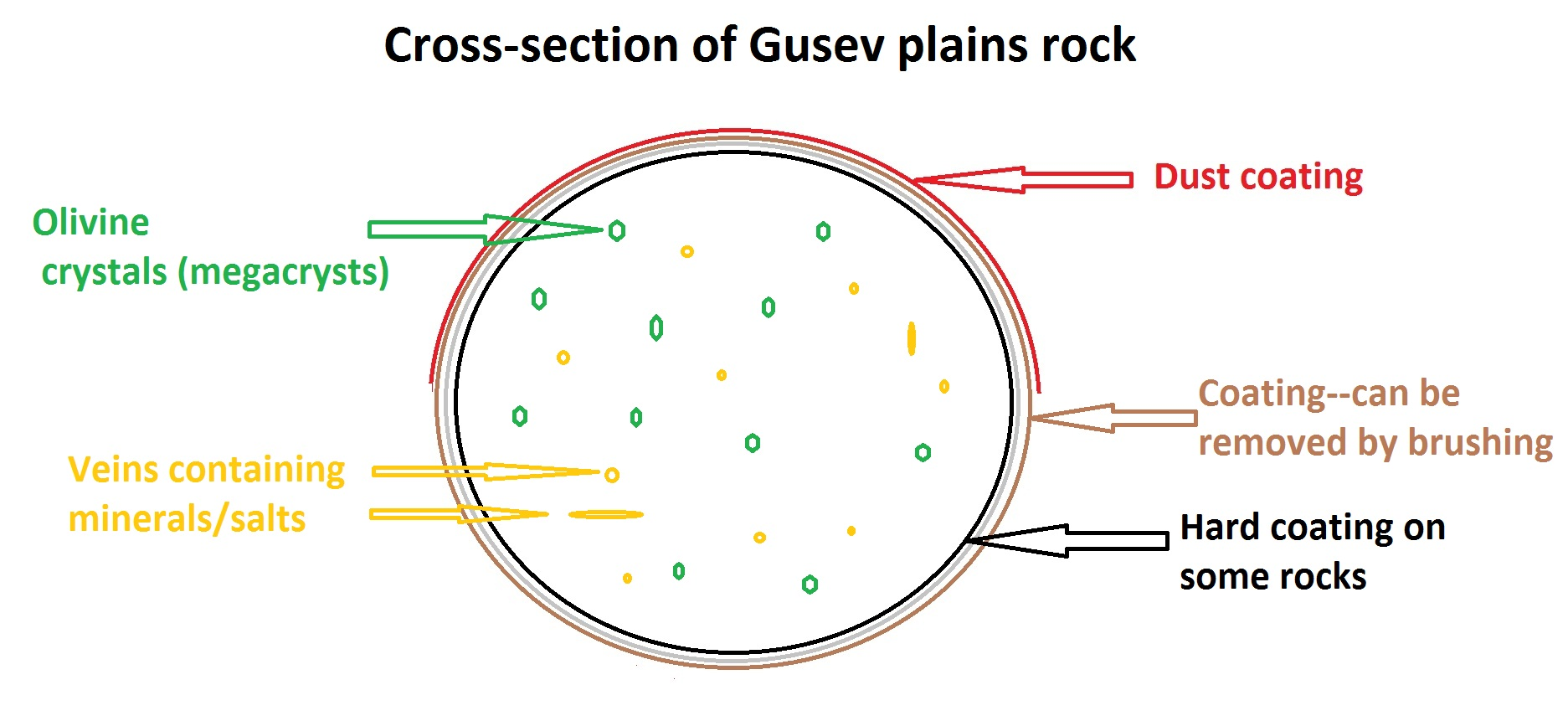
Cross-sectional drawing of a typical rock from the plains of the Gusev crater. Most rocks contain a coating of dust and one or more harder coatings. Veins of water-deposited veins are visible, along with crystals of olivine. Veins may contain bromine salts.

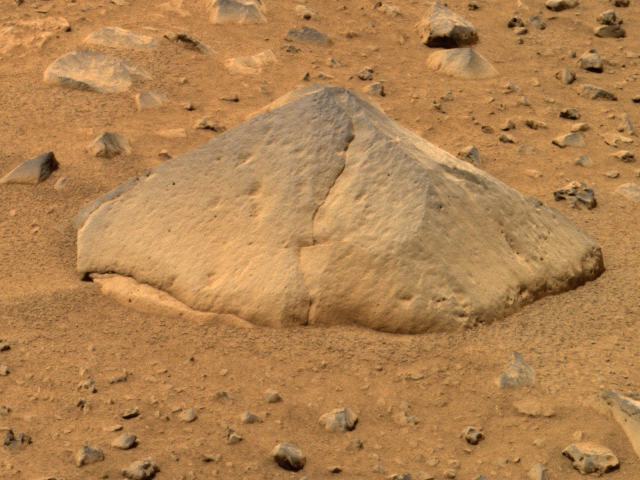
An approximate true-color view of the rock nicknamed Adirondack, taken by Spirit's pancam

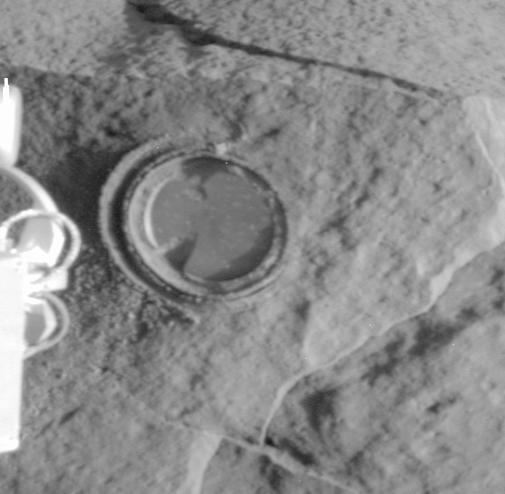
Digital camera image (from Spirit's Pancam) of Adirondack after a RAT grind (Spirit's rock grinding tool)

=== Columbia Hills ===
Scientists found a variety of rock types in the Columbia Hills, and they placed them into six different categories. The six are: Clovis, Wishbone, Peace, Watchtower, Backstay, and Independence. They are named after a prominent rock in each group. Their chemical compositions, as measured by APXS, are significantly different from each other. Most importantly, all of the rocks in Columbia Hills show various degrees of alteration due to aqueous fluids. They are enriched in the elements phosphorus, sulfur, chlorine, and bromine—all of which can be carried around in water solutions. The Columbia Hills’ rocks contain basaltic glass, along with varying amounts of olivine and sulfates. The olivine abundance varies inversely with the amount of sulfates. This is exactly what is expected because water destroys olivine but helps to produce sulfates.

The Clovis group is especially interesting because the Mössbauer spectrometer(MB) detected goethite in it. Goethite forms only in the presence of water, so its discovery is the first direct evidence of past water in the Columbia Hills's rocks. In addition, the MB spectra of rocks and outcrops displayed a strong decline in olivine presence, although the rocks probably once contained much olivine. Olivine is a marker for the lack of water because it easily decomposes in the presence of water. Sulfate was found, and it needs water to form. Wishstone contained a great deal of plagioclase, some olivine, and anhydrate (a sulfate). Peace rocks showed sulfur and strong evidence for bound water, so hydrated sulfates are suspected. Watchtower class rocks lack olivine consequently they may have been altered by water. The Independence class showed some signs of clay (perhaps montmorillonite a member of the smectite group). Clays require fairly long term exposure to water to form. One type of soil, called Paso Robles, from the Columbia Hills, may be an evaporate deposit because it contains large amounts of sulfur, phosphorus, calcium, and iron. Also, MB found that much of the iron in Paso Robles soil was of the oxidized, Fe^{+++} form, which would happen if water had been present.

Towards the middle of the six-year mission (a mission that was supposed to last only 90 days), large amounts of pure silica were found in the soil. The silica could have come from the interaction of soil with acid vapors produced by volcanic activity in the presence of water or from water in a hot spring environment.

After Spirit stopped working scientists studied old data from the Miniature Thermal Emission Spectrometer, or Mini-TES and confirmed the presence of large amounts of carbonate-rich rocks, which means that regions of the planet may have once harbored water. The carbonates were discovered in an outcrop of rocks called "Comanche."

In summary, Spirit found evidence of slight weathering on the plains of Gusev, but no evidence that a lake was there. However, in the Columbia Hills there was clear evidence for a moderate amount of aqueous weathering. The evidence included sulfates and the minerals goethite and carbonates which only form in the presence of water. It is believed that Gusev crater may have held a lake long ago, but it has since been covered by igneous materials. All the dust contains a magnetic component which was identified as magnetite with some titanium. Furthermore, the thin coating of dust that covers everything on Mars is the same in all parts of Mars.

== Features within Gusev ==
=== Hills ===
- The Columbia Hills is a range of low hills 3 km from Spirit's original landing site; Spirit explored within them
  - Husband Hill is one of these hills
  - McCool Hill is the tallest of the Columbia Hills
  - Larry's Lookout is within Columbia Hills
- The Apollo 1 Hills are three widely spaced hills 7–14 km away from Spirit's landing site

=== Craters ===
- Bonneville is a 200-metre crater visited by Spirit
- Crivitz is a smaller crater located within Gusev
- Thira is a crater located within Gusev, and could be seen from the summit of Husband Hill

=== Other ===
- Sleepy Hollow is a shallow depression near Spirit's landing site
- Adirondack is the name of the first rock visited by Spirit
- Home Plate is a layered geological feature recently studied by Spirit

== Landing site ==
Gusev crater was one of three candidates for a landing site for the Mars 2020 rover as of 2017. Columbia Hills was previously explored by Spirit rover, which after several years of activity stopped communicating in 2010.

Other landing site candidates for the Mars 2020 rover, by 2017, were Northeast Syrtis (Syrtis Major)and Jezero crater.

== In popular culture ==
- Gusev Crater is the landing site of the Mars Consortium mission in Gregory Benford's 1999 novel The Martian Race.
- The setting of the 2009 Doctor Who episode "The Waters of Mars" is Bowie Base One, in Gusev Crater.
- Gusev Crater is featured in the science fiction TV series Defying Gravity as the location of the Alpha extraterrestrial signal central to the plot. It was also the landing location of the failed Mars mission that took place in 2042.

== See also ==
- Aeolis quadrangle
- Composition of Mars
- Geography of Mars
- Geology of Mars
- Impact crater
- Impact event
- List of craters on Mars
- Ore resources on Mars
- Planetary nomenclature
- Scientific information from the Mars Exploration Rover mission
- Spirit rover for Spirit's journey within Gusev
