= Husband Hill =

Hill in Gusev crater, Mars

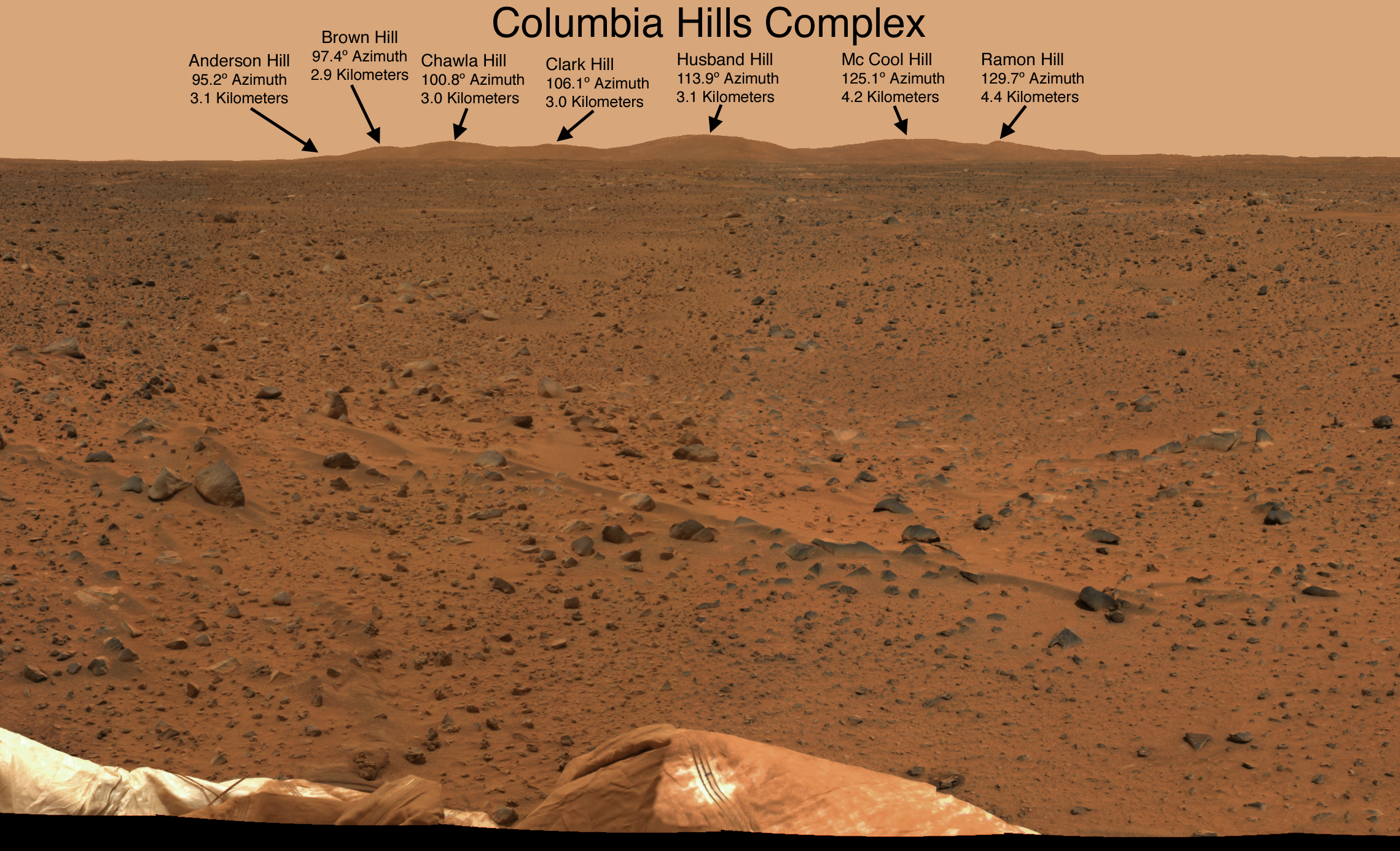
The Columbia Hills, as seen from the landing site of the Spirit rover. Husband Hill is the tallest of the peaks.

Husband Hill is one of the Columbia Hills in Gusev crater, Mars, which are close to the landing site of NASA's Spirit rover. It was named in honor of Rick Husband, the commander of the Space Shuttle Columbia when it disintegrated upon atmospheric reentry (see Space Shuttle Columbia disaster).

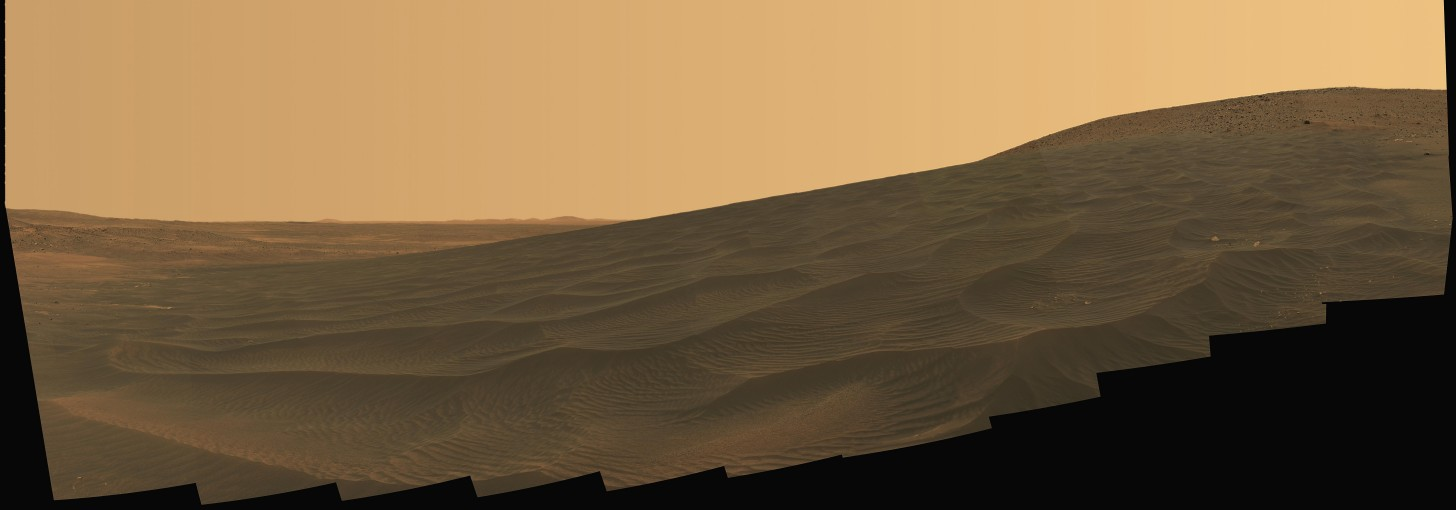
An approximate true color rendering of El Dorado, an albedo feature on the south side of Husband Hill

In 2005, the Spirit rover, as part of its exploration of its landing site, slowly climbed to the top of Husband Hill. It reached the summit on August 21, 2005, and began its descent on September 25, 2005, after spending nearly two months examining the outcrops and views of the summit plateau before moving on. Named areas on the hill include the "Cumberland Ridge", where rocks with higher than normal phosphorus content exist, and "El Dorado", a dark albedo feature on the south side.

Husband Hill rises about 351 ft (107 m) above surrounding plains.

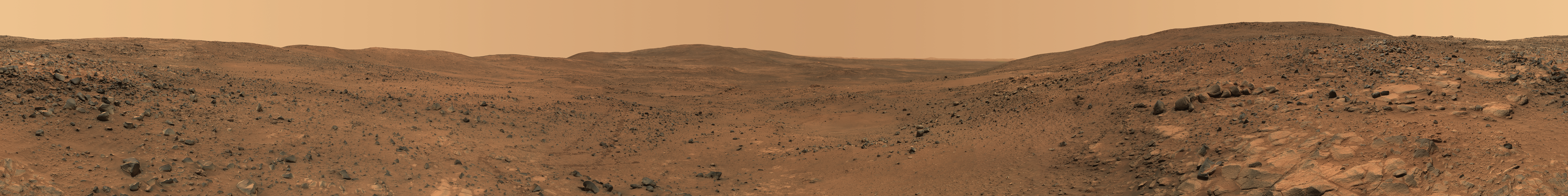
360° panorama taken during the descent from the summit
