= Home Plate (Mars) =

Extraterrestrial Plateau

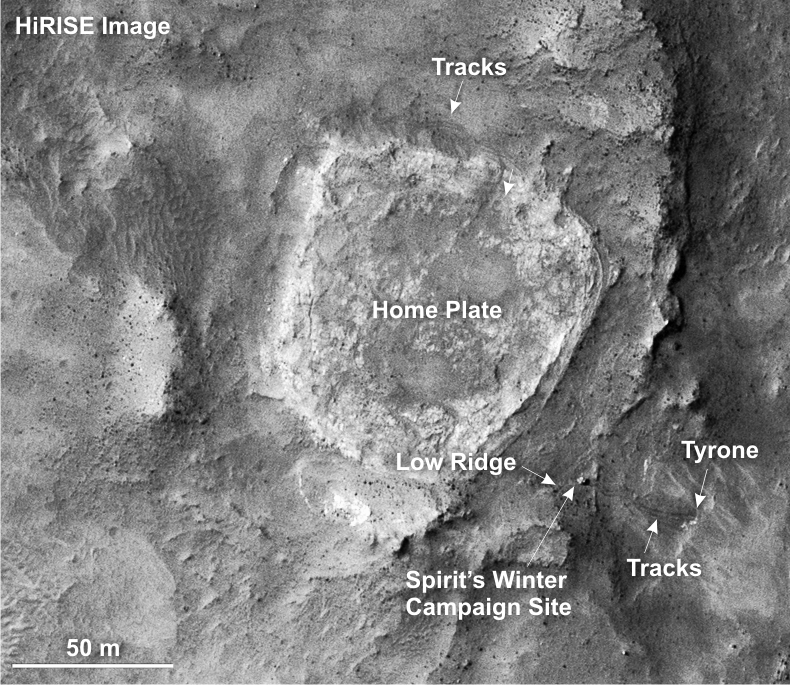
- HiRISE image of the "Home Plate" rock outcrop.
- Feature type: Rock outcrop
- Coordinates: 14.6°S 175.5°E

Home Plate is a plateau roughly 90 metres (300 ft) across within the Columbia Hills, Mars. It is informally named for its similarity in shape to a baseball home plate. Home Plate is a rocky outcrop that appears to show layered features.

The plateau has been extensively studied by Spirit, one of the Mars Exploration Rovers, since 2006. The rover became stuck in loose granular material alongside the northeast side of the plateau. The rover last communicated with Earth on March 22, 2010.

== Exploration ==
Spirit arrived at Home Plate on sol 744 (February 7, 2006) and has completed a scientific investigation with her robotic arm before moving to Low Ridge Haven due to power concerns. She returned on sol 1126 to resume those studies.

Spirit spent her third Martian winter on Home Plate's north edge.

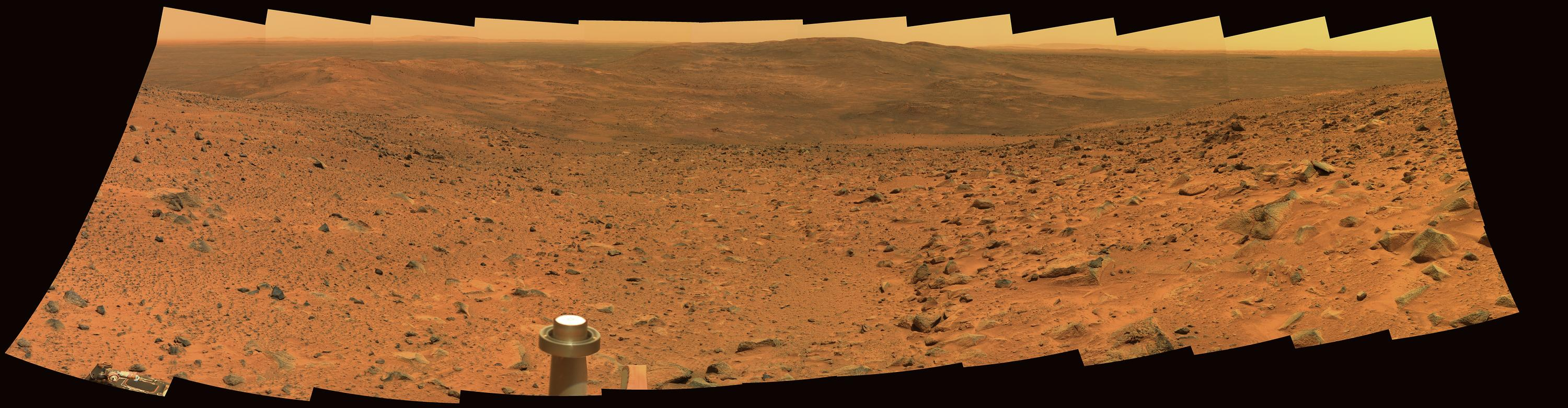
Home Plate (upper center), as seen from the summit of Husband Hill.

== Origins ==
Scientists now believe that Home Plate is an explosive volcanic deposit. It is surrounded by deposits of basalt, which are believed to have exploded on contact with water. The presence of brine is further supported by the high concentration of chloride ions in the surrounding rocks. The presence of bomb sags (laminae typically found in beds of volcanish ash) seems to confirm this hypothesis.

A patch of 90% pure opaline silicon dioxide was unearthed by Spirit in the vicinity of Home Plate. The patch is believed to be formed in acidic hydrothermal conditions, which supports the theory that Home Plate is of an explosive volcanic origin. Water is also present as mineral hydrates.

Since 2008, scientists believe that this formation is an example of an eroded, ancient, and extinct fumarole.

== Gallery ==
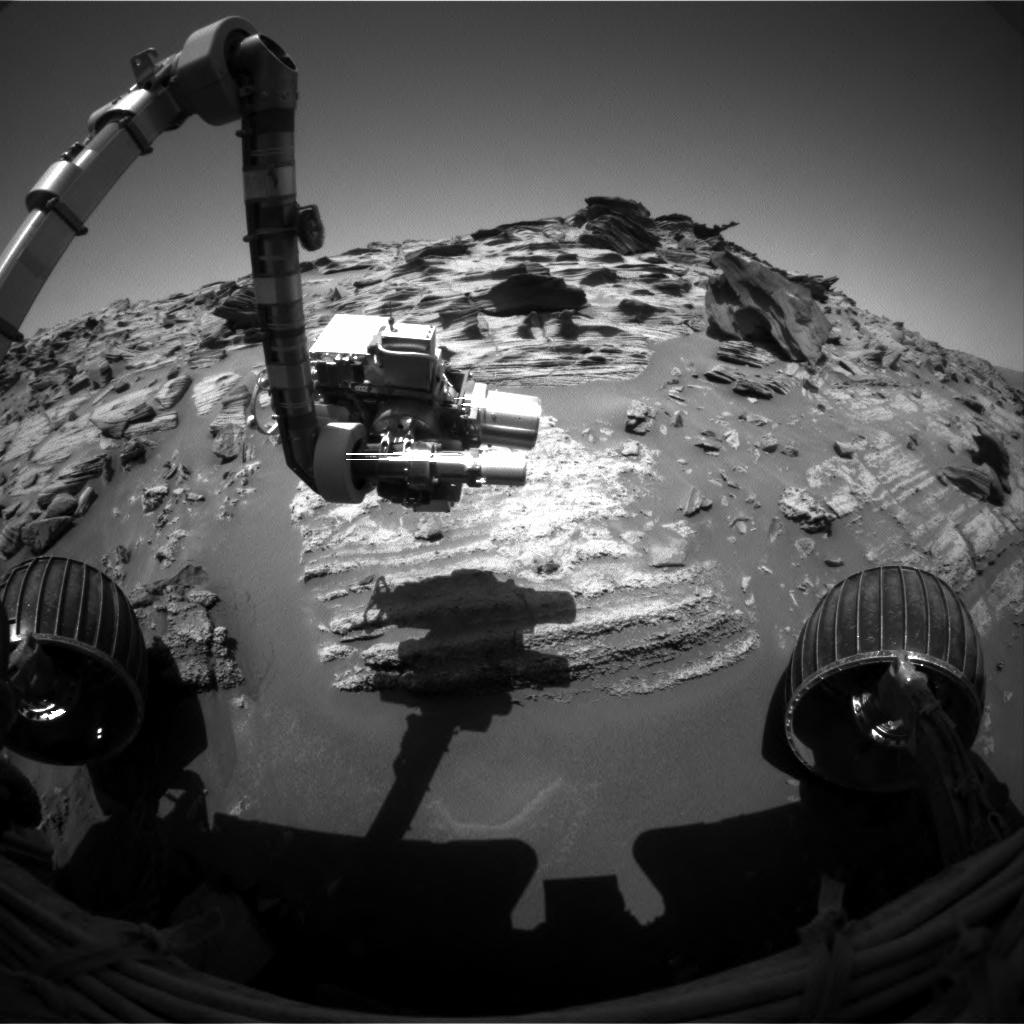
Spirit imager moves towards Home Plate.

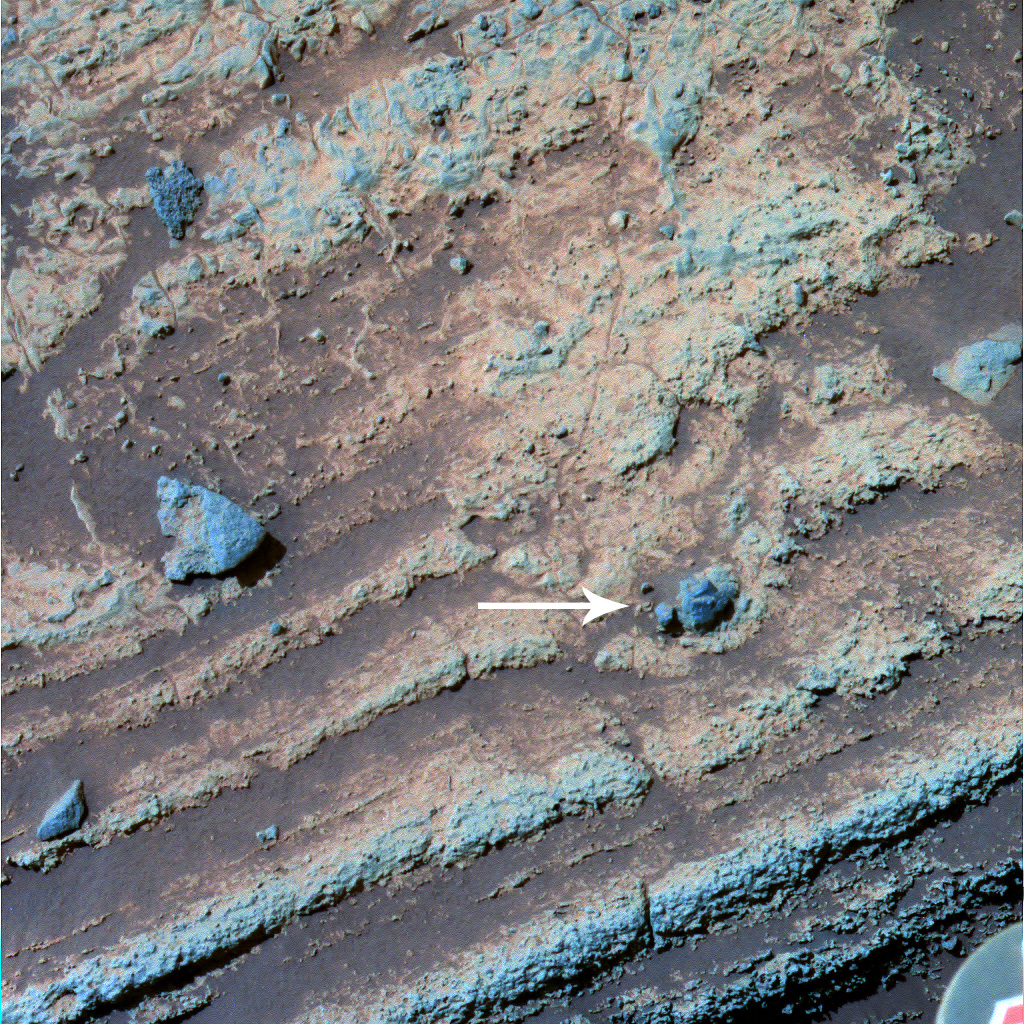
Bomb sag

Curious rock, "animated" via wiggle stereoscopy.

== See also ==
- List of rocks on Mars
