= Columbia Hills (Mars) =

Range of low hills inside Gusev crater on Mars

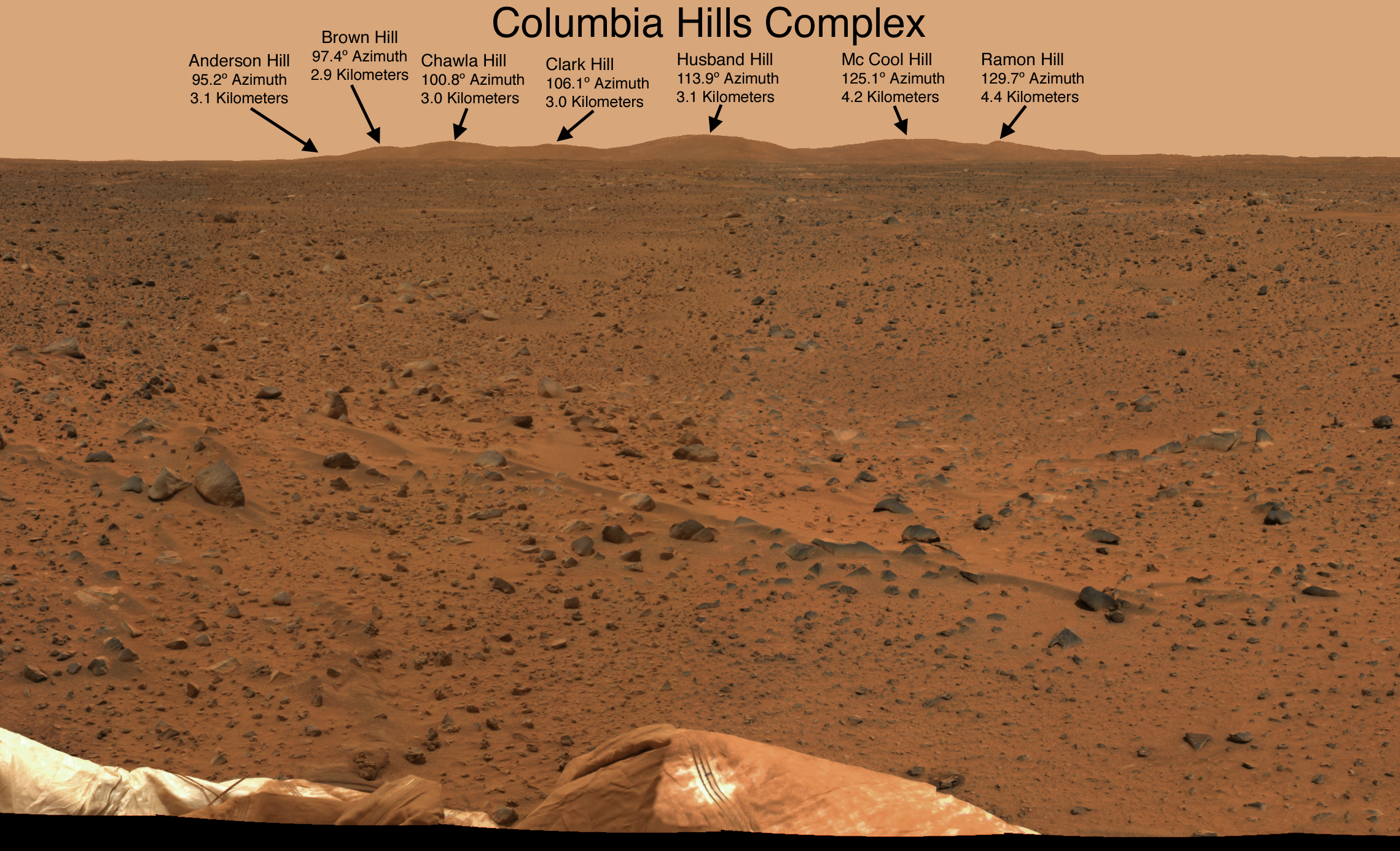
The view of Columbia Hills from the Spirit landing site

The Columbia Hills are a range of low hills inside Gusev crater on Mars. They were observed by the Mars Exploration Rover Spirit when it landed within the crater in 2004. They were promptly given an unofficial name by NASA since they were the most striking nearby feature on the surface. The hills lie approximately 3 kilometres (1.9 mi) away from the rover's original landing position. The range is named to memorialize the Space Shuttle Columbia disaster. On February 1, 2003, the individual peaks of the Columbia Hills were named after the seven astronauts who died in the disaster. Spirit spent a few years exploring the Columbia Hills until it ceased to function in 2010. It was also considered a potential landing site for the Mars 2020 Perseverance rover, before the selection of Jezero crater in November 2018.

== Peaks ==
The seven peaks are, from north to south:

- Anderson Hill - named after Michael P. Anderson
- Brown Hill - named after David M. Brown
- Chawla Hill - named after Kalpana Chawla
- Clark Hill - named after Laurel Clark
- Husband Hill - named after Rick Husband
- McCool Hill - named after William C. McCool
- Ramon Hill - named after Ilan Ramon

== Rocks and Minerals of Columbia Hills ==
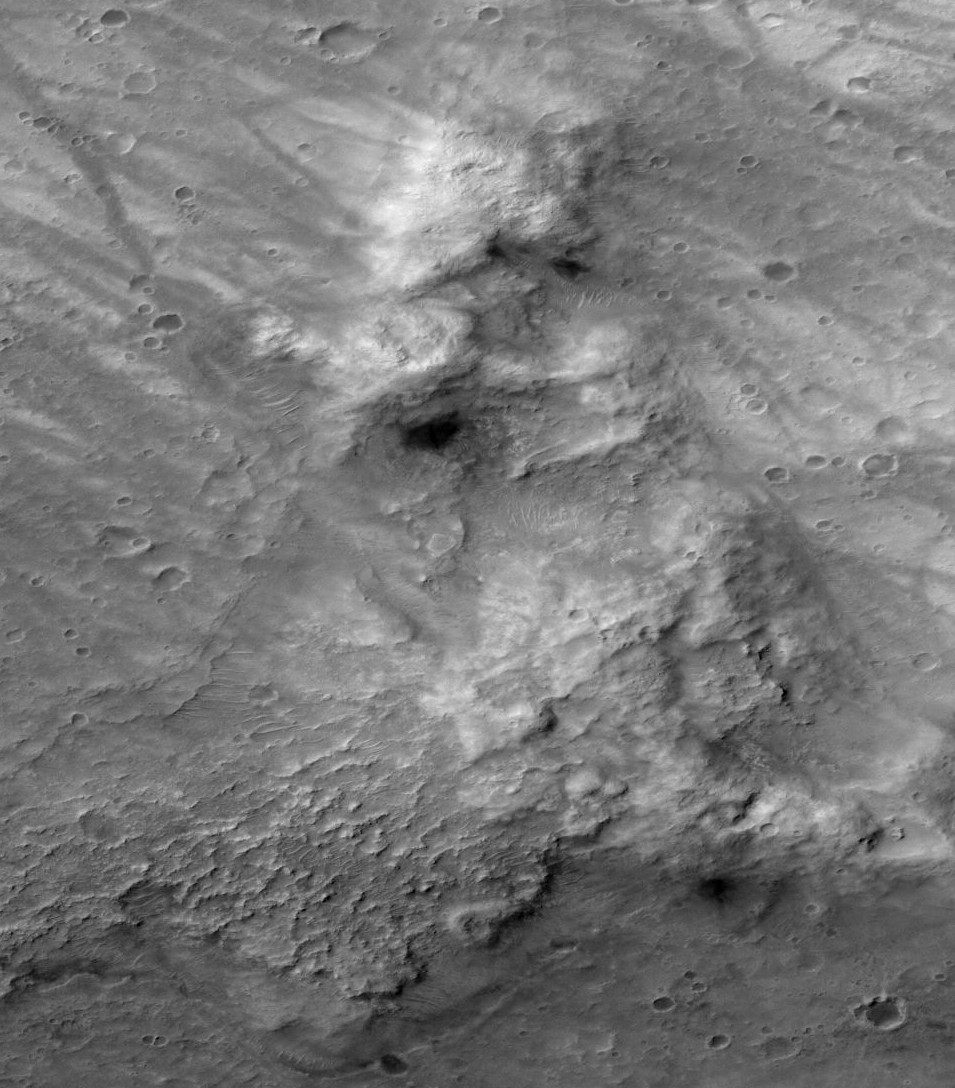
Unlabelled overhead view of the Columbia Hills. A labelled version is available here.

With the Spirit rover, scientists found a variety of rock types in the Columbia Hills, and they placed them into six different categories, each named after a prominent rock in the respective group: Clovis, Wishbone, Peace, Watchtower, Backstay, and Independence. Their chemical compositions, as measured by APXS, are significantly different from each other. Most importantly, all of the rocks in Columbia Hills show various degrees of alteration by aqueous fluids. They are enriched in the elements phosphorus, sulfur, chlorine, and bromine—all of which can be carried around in water solutions. The Columbia Hills’ rocks contain basaltic glass, along with varying amounts of olivine and sulfates. The olivine abundance varies inversely with the amount of sulfates. This is exactly what is expected because water destroys olivine but helps to produce sulfates.

Acid fog is believed to have changed some of the Watchtower rocks. This was in a 200 meter long section of Cumberland Ridge and the Husband Hill summit. Certain places became less crystalline and more amorphous. Acidic water vapor from volcanoes dissolved some minerals forming a gel. When water evaporated a cement formed and produced small bumps. This type of process has been observed in the lab when basalt rocks are exposed to sulfuric and hydrochloric acids.

The Clovis group is especially interesting because the Mössbauer spectrometer (MB) detected goethite in it. Goethite forms only in the presence of water, so its discovery is the first direct evidence of past water in the Columbia Hills's rocks. In addition, the MB spectra of rocks and outcrops displayed a strong decline in olivine presence, although the rocks probably once contained much olivine. Olivine is a marker for the lack of water because it easily decomposes in the presence of water. Sulfate was found, and it needs water to form.

Wishstone contained a great deal of plagioclase, some olivine, and anhydrite (a calcium sulfate). Peace rocks showed sulfur and strong evidence for bound water, so hydrated sulfates are suspected. Watchtower class rocks lack olivine, implying that they may have been altered by water. The Independence class showed some signs of clay (perhaps montmorillonite, a member of the smectite group). Clays require fairly long term exposure to water to form.

One type of soil, called Paso Robles, from the Columbia Hills, may be an evaporite deposit because it contains large amounts of sulfur, phosphorus, calcium, and iron. Also, MB found that much of the iron in Paso Robles soil was of the oxidized, Fe^{+++} form, which would happen if water had been present.

Towards the middle of the six-year mission (a mission that was supposed to last only 90 days), large amounts of pure silica were found in the soil. The silica could have come from the interaction of soil with acid vapors produced by volcanic activity in the presence of water or from water in a hot spring environment.

After Spirit stopped working scientists studied old data from the Miniature Thermal Emission Spectrometer (Mini-TES) and confirmed the presence of large amounts of carbonate-rich rocks, which means that regions of the planet may have once harbored water. The carbonates were discovered in an outcrop of rocks called "Comanche."

== See also ==
- Apollo 1 Hills
- Geography of Mars
- Composition of Mars
- Aeolis quadrangle
