= Millie Hughes =

Millie Hughes may refer to:

- Millie Hughes-Fulford
- Milly Hughes, a character in the film Village of the Damned
