= STS-40 =

1991 American crewed spaceflight

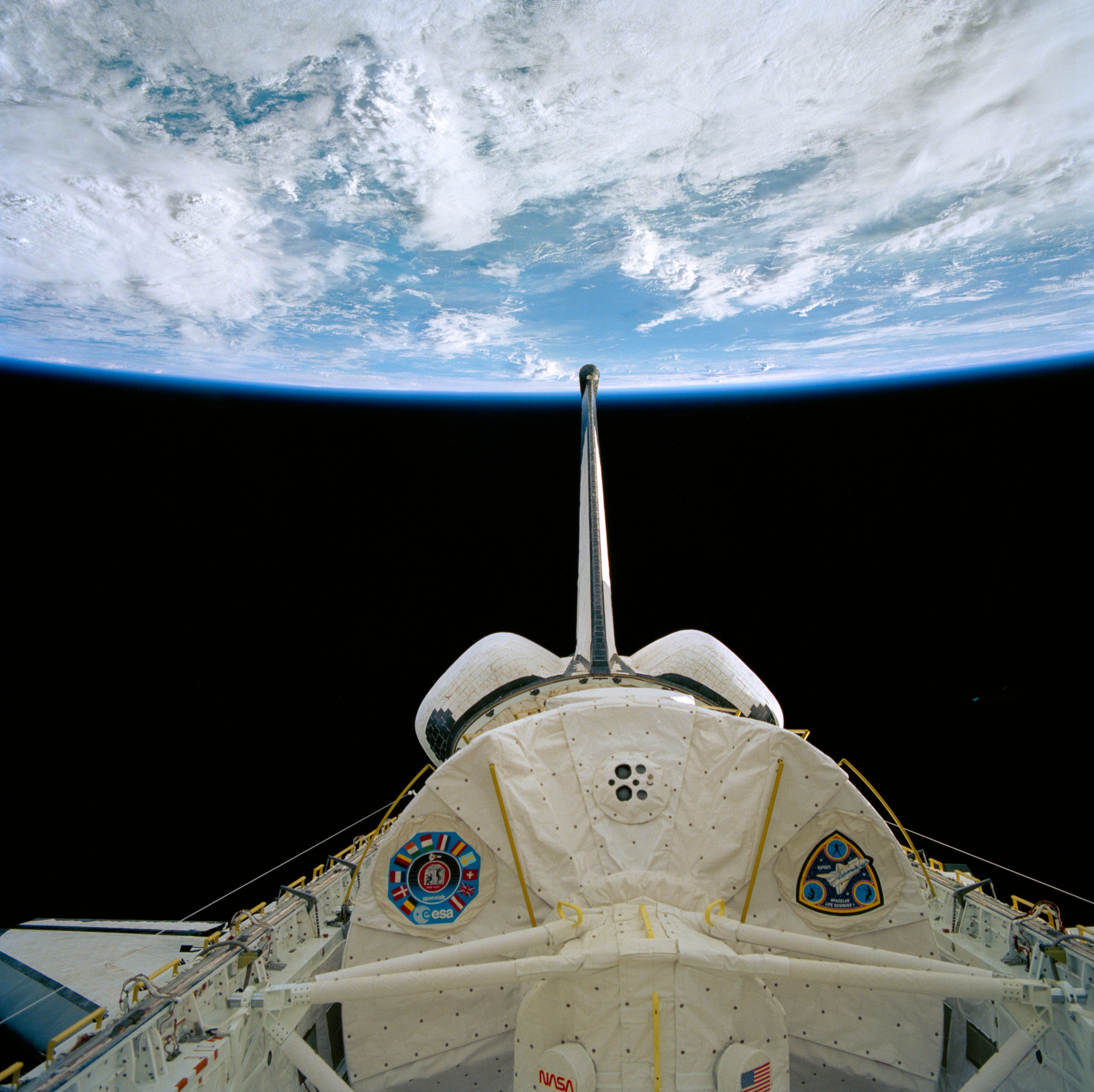
- Spacelab Module LM1 in Columbia's payload bay, serving as the Spacelab Life Sciences laboratory
- Names: Space Transportation System-40
- Mission type: Spacelab Life Sciences-1 (SLS-1)
- Operator: NASA
- COSPAR ID: 1991-040A
- SATCAT no.: 21399
- Mission duration: 9 days, 2 hours, 14 minutes, 20 seconds
- Distance travelled: 6,083,223 km (3,779,940 mi)
- Orbits completed: 146

Spacecraft properties
- Spacecraft: Space Shuttle Columbia
- Launch mass: 114,290 kg (251,970 lb)
- Landing mass: 102,283 kg (225,495 lb)
- Payload mass: 12,374 kg (27,280 lb)

Crew
- Crew size: 7
- Members: Bryan D. O'Connor; Sidney M. Gutierrez; James P. Bagian; Tamara E. Jernigan; Rhea Seddon; F. Drew Gaffney; Millie Hughes-Fulford

Start of mission
- Launch date: June 5, 1991, 13:24:51 UTC (9:24:51 am EDT)
- Launch site: Kennedy, LC-39B
- Contractor: Rockwell International

End of mission
- Landing date: June 14, 1991, 15:39:11 UTC (8:39:11 am PDT)
- Landing site: Edwards, Runway 22

Orbital parameters
- Reference system: Geocentric orbit
- Regime: Low Earth orbit
- Perigee altitude: 287 km (178 mi)
- Apogee altitude: 296 km (184 mi)
- Inclination: 39.02°
- Period: 90.40 minutes

Instruments
- Getaway Special (GAS) canisters; Middeck Zero-Gravity Dynamics Experiment (MODE)
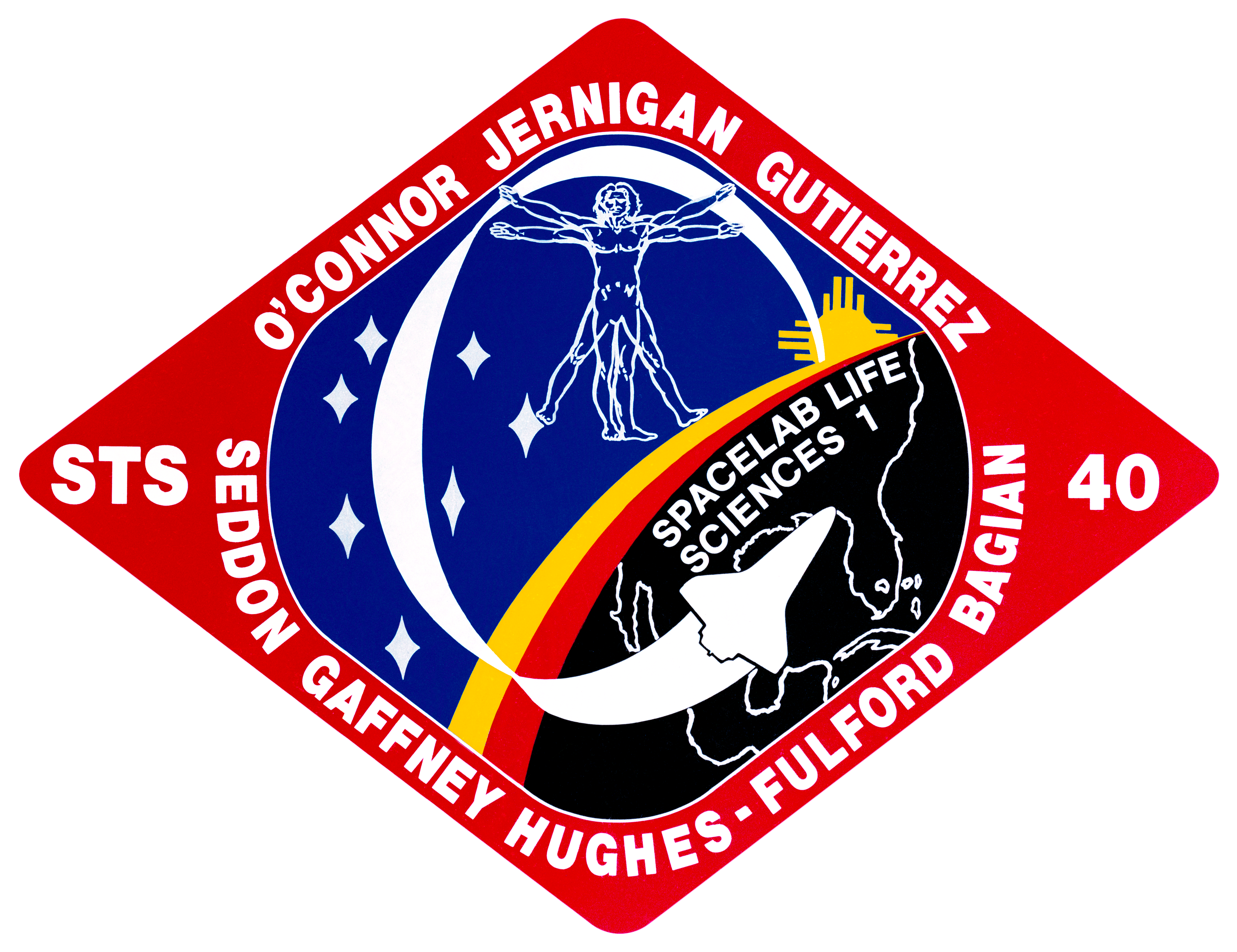
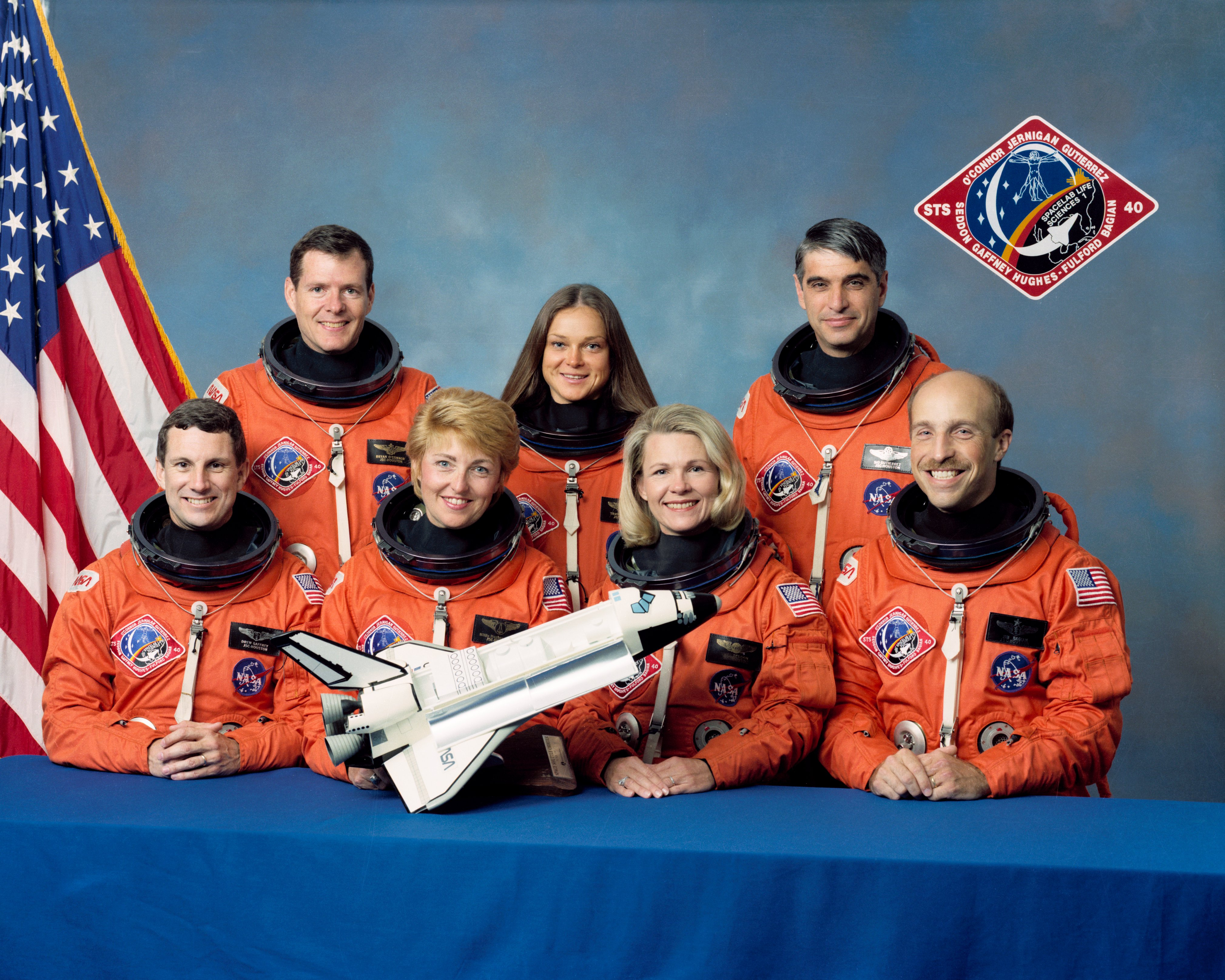
- STS-40 mission patch Back row: O'Connor, Jernigan and Gutierrez; Front row: Gaffney, Hughes-Fulford, Seddon and Bagian Space Shuttle program

STS-40, the eleventh launch of Space Shuttle Columbia, was a nine-day mission in June 1991. It carried the Spacelab module for Spacelab Life Sciences 1 (SLS-1), the fifth Spacelab mission and the first dedicated solely to biology. STS-40 was the first spaceflight that included three women crew members.

== Crew ==
Position	Astronaut
Commander	Bryan D. O'Connor; Second and last spaceflight
Pilot	Sidney M. Gutierrez; First spaceflight
Mission Specialist 1	James P. Bagian; Second and last spaceflight
Mission Specialist 2 Flight Engineer	Tamara E. Jernigan; First spaceflight
Mission Specialist 3	Rhea Seddon; Second spaceflight
Payload Specialist 1	F. Drew Gaffney; Only spaceflight
Payload Specialist 2	Millie Hughes-Fulford; Only spaceflight

Backup crew
Position	Astronaut
Payload Specialist 2	Robert W. Phillips

=== Crew seat assignments ===
Seat	Launch	Landing	Seats 1–4 are on the flight deck. Seats 5–7 are on the mid-deck.
1	O'Connor		Seats 1–4 are on the flight deck. Seats 5–7 are on the mid-deck.
2	Gutierrez		Seats 1–4 are on the flight deck. Seats 5–7 are on the mid-deck.
3	Bagian	Seddon	Seats 1–4 are on the flight deck. Seats 5–7 are on the mid-deck.
4	Jernigan		Seats 1–4 are on the flight deck. Seats 5–7 are on the mid-deck.
5	Seddon	Bagian	Seats 1–4 are on the flight deck. Seats 5–7 are on the mid-deck.
6	Gaffney		Seats 1–4 are on the flight deck. Seats 5–7 are on the mid-deck.
7	Hughes-Fulford		Seats 1–4 are on the flight deck. Seats 5–7 are on the mid-deck.

== Mission highlights ==
Attempt	Planned	Result	Turnaround	Reason	Decision point	Weather go (%)	Notes
1	22 May 1991, 8:00:00 am	Scrubbed	—	Technical	20 May 1991, 12:00 am (T−11:00:00 hold)		Leak in liquid hydrogen transducer and computer problems.
2	1 Jun 1991, 8:00:00 am	Scrubbed	10 days 0 hours 0 minutes	Technical	1 Jun 1991, 7:00 am (T−00:20:00 hold)	80	Calibration failure in IMU 2.
3	5 Jun 1991, 9:24:51 am	Success	4 days 1 hour 25 minutes				Delayed by one hour and 24 minutes due to low cloud cover.

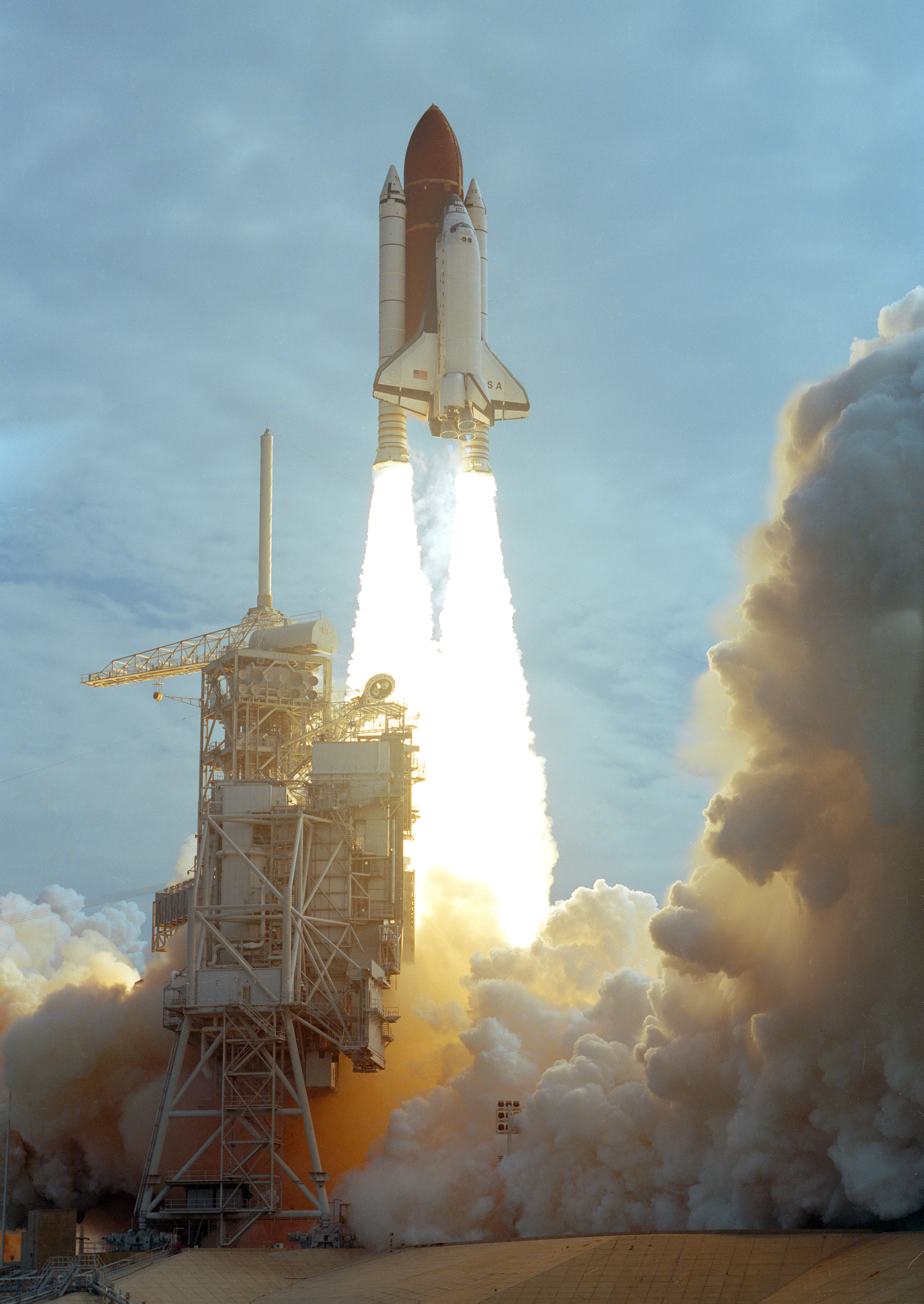
Launch of STS-40

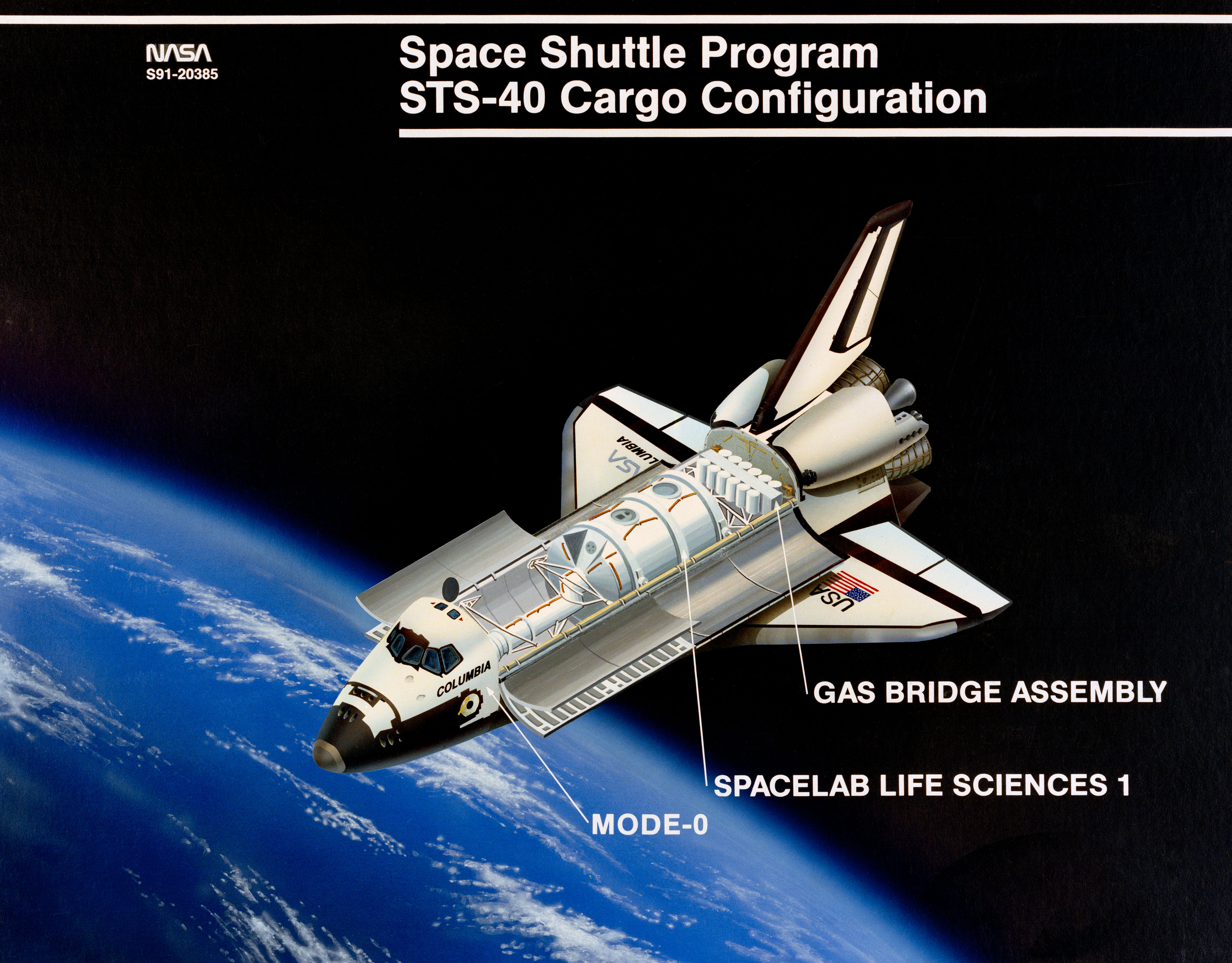
Payload bay configuration for the STS-40 mission

The launch was originally set for May 22, 1991. The mission was postponed less than 48 hours before launch when it became known that a leaking liquid hydrogen transducer in the orbiter's main propulsion system, which was removed and replaced during leak testing in 1990, had failed an analysis by a vendor. Engineers feared that one or more of the nine liquid hydrogen and liquid oxygen transducers protruding into fuel and oxidizer lines could break off and be ingested by the engine turbopumps, causing engine failure.

In addition, one of the orbiter's five general purpose computers failed completely, along with one of the multiplexer demultiplexers that controlled the orbiter's hydraulics ordinance and Orbital Maneuvering System / Reaction Control System functions in the aft compartment.

A new general purpose computer and multiplexer demultiplexer were installed and tested. One liquid hydrogen and two liquid oxygen transducers were replaced upstream in the propellant flow system near the 43 cm (17 in) disconnect area, which is protected by internal screen. Three liquid oxygen transducers were replaced in the engine manifold area, while three liquid hydrogen transducers here were removed and the openings plugged. The launch was reset for 8:00 a.m. EDT, June 1, 1991, but postponed again after several attempts to calibrate inertial measurement unit 2 failed. The unit was replaced and retested, and the launch was rescheduled for June 5, 1991. The mission launched successfully on June 5, 1991, at 9:24:51 a.m. EDT and the mission had a launch weight of 114,290 kg (251,970 lb). The launch was also captured on IMAX cameras, and used in the 2015 documentary film Journey to Space.

It was the fifth dedicated Spacelab mission, Spacelab Life Sciences-1, and first dedicated solely to life sciences, using the habitable module. The mission featured the most detailed and interrelated physiological measurements in space since the 1973–1974 Skylab missions. The subjects involved were humans, 30 rodents and thousands of tiny Moon Jellies (Aurelia aurita). Primary SLS-1 experiments studied six body systems; of 18 investigations, ten involved humans, seven involved rodents, and one used jellyfish.

Six body systems investigated were cardiovascular/cardiopulmonary (heart, lungs and blood vessels); renal/endocrine (kidneys and hormone-secreting organs and glands); blood (blood plasma); immune system (white blood cells); musculoskeletal (muscles and bones); and neurovestibular (brains and nerves, eyes and inner ear). Other payloads included twelve Getaway Special (GAS) canisters installed on GAS bridge in cargo bay for experiments in materials science, plant biology and cosmic radiation (see G-616); Middeck Zero-Gravity Dynamics Experiment (MODE); and seven Orbiter Experiments (OEX).

Columbia landed on June 14, 1991, at 8:39:11 a.m. PDT, on Runway 22, at Edwards Air Force Base, California. It returned to KSC on June 21, 1991.

== Wake-up calls ==
NASA began a tradition of playing music to astronauts during the Project Gemini, which was first used to wake up a flight crew during Apollo 15. Each track is specially chosen, often by the astronauts' families, and usually has a special meaning to an individual member of the crew, or is applicable to their daily activities.

Day	Song	Artist/Composer	Played For
Day 2	"Great Balls of Fire"	Jerry Lee Lewis	
Day 3	A "Military Medally" (Note: Consisting of Air Force and Marine Corps songs for O'Connor and Gutierrez, a Marine Corp Colonel and an Air Force Lt. Colonel respectively.)		O'Connor, Gutierrez
Day 4	"Yakety Yak"	The Coasters	
Day 5	Greetings from the crews' children "Somewhere Out There" from the movie "An American Tail"	Linda Ronstadt, James Ingram	
Day 6	"Cow Patty"		Tammy Jernigan
Day 7	"Shout - The Faber College Theme" from the movie "Animal House"	Otis Day and the Knights	
Day 8	"Twistin' the Night Away" from the movie, "Animal House"	Sam Cooke	
Day 9	"Chain Gang"	The Nylons	
Day 10	"What a Wonderful World"	Louis Armstrong	

== See also ==
- G-616 "The effects of Cosmic Radiation on Floppy Disks"
- List of human spaceflights
- List of Space Shuttle missions
- Outline of space science
- Space Shuttle
