= Francis Gaffney =

Francis Gaffney is the name of:

- F. Drew Gaffney (born 1946), Francis Andrew Gaffney, American doctor who flew aboard a NASA Space Shuttle mission
- Frank Gaffney (born 1953), is the founder and president of the think tank Center for Security Policy and columnist
