= Freestar =

Freestar is a name used more than once:

- FREESTAR, a payload of six separate experiments on the Space Shuttle Columbia.
- Ford Freestar, a car designed by Ford Motor Company.
