= Project POSTAR =

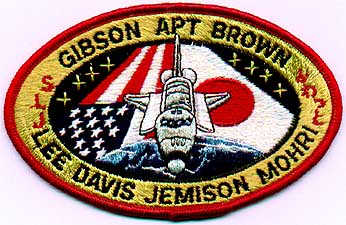
STS-47 Mission Patch

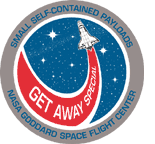
Get Away Special Logo

Project POSTAR was the first space experiment created entirely by members of the Boy Scouts of America. On September 12, 1992, Space Shuttle Endeavour mission STS-47 carried 10 Get Away Special (GAS) canisters. Amongst these GAS cansisters was G-102 sponsored by the Boy Scouts of America's Exploring Division in cooperation with the TRW Systems Integration Group, Fairfax, Virginia. The project was named Project POSTAR. (The name was a combination of the words "Post" and "Star").

== Beginnings ==
What was to become Project POSTAR began in late 1978 when TRW purchased the "GAS Can" for $10,000. The Exploring Division of the Boy Scouts of America announced the opportunity for Explorer Posts and Sea Explorer (see: Sea Scouting) Ships to design experiments to fly on the Space Shuttle.

Approximately two-hundred Posts and Ships from around the United States expressed interest in developing an experiment, and thirty-eight submitted a first phase proposal. A panel of scientists and engineers from NASA, TRW, and the Boy Scouts of America, headed by astronaut James A. Lovell, selected eighteen experiments for the second phase. In 1982, the experiments were pared down to a final eleven. NASA Explorer Post 1275 located at Goddard Space Flight Center, Greenbelt, Maryland integrated all the experiments into the GAS canister.

== Tragedy and success ==
NASA grounded the Space Shuttle program after the explosion of Space Shuttle Challenger during the launch of mission STS-51-L on January 28, 1986. This action meant that Project POSTAR might not ever fly. Due to the hard work of many, an albeit smaller Project POSTAR was launched on Space Shuttle Endeavour on September 12, 1992.

The final seven experiments and their sponsors were:

- Capillary Pumping developed by Explorer Post 9005 and sponsored by the McDonnell Douglas Corp., St. Louis, MO.
- Cosmic Ray developed by Sea Explorer Ship 101 and sponsored by the American Legion of Bridgeport, CT.
- Crystal Growth developed by Explorer Post 310 and Emulsions developed by Explorer Post 310, both sponsored by Chesebrough-Pond's Research Laboratory, Trumbull, CT.
- Fiber Optics developed by Explorer Post 475 sponsored by the Naval Avionics Center, Indianapolis, IN.
- Floppy Disk developed by Explorer Post 1022 sponsored by the Church of Jesus Christ of Latter-day Saints, Columbia, Maryland.
- Fluid Droplets developed by Explorer Posts 822 and 2268 sponsored by Martin Marietta, Littleton, CO and the Denver Museum of Natural History, Denver, CO.
- Command, Power and Mechanical Systems designed by Explorer Post 1275 sponsored by the Goddard Explorer Club of NASA Goddard Space Flight Center, Greenbelt, MD.

== See also ==
- Get Away Special
- Boy Scouts of America
