= Freestar experiment =

Experiment payload on the Space Shuttle Columbia

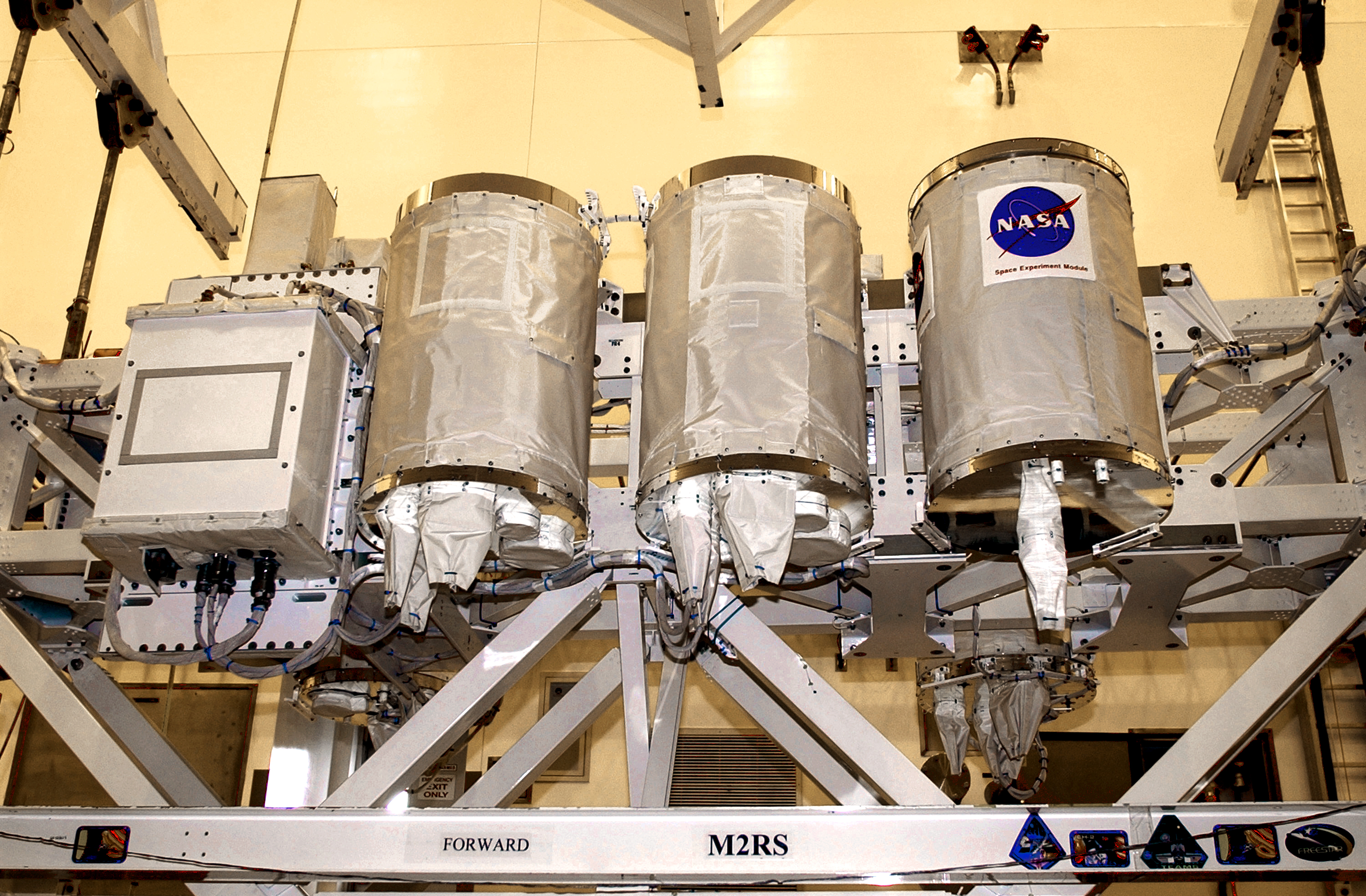
The Hitchhiker Bridge with GetAway Special canisters (GAS cans) and carrying the FREESTAR experiments

FREESTAR, which stands for Fast Reaction Experiments Enabling Science Technology Applications and Research, was a payload of six separate experiments on the Space Shuttle Columbia.

It was mounted on a crossbay Hitchhiker Multipurpose Equipment Support Structure in the Shuttle's payload bay during the STS-107 flight, which ended with the disintegration of Columbia during re-entry into the Earth's atmosphere. Although data was lost in the re-entry, much of the data collected while in space, such as that from MEIDEX, had already been transmitted to ground stations.

== Experiments ==
The six experiments were:

=== Mediterranean Israeli Dust Experiment (MEIDEX) ===
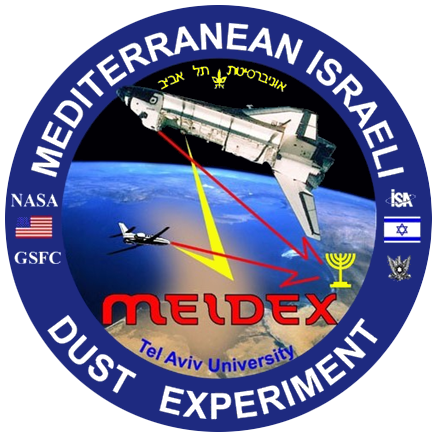
MEIDEX Seal as used by the Israel Space Agency and NASA

The primary mission of the MEIDEX payload was to study the temporal and spatial distribution and physical properties of atmospheric desert dust over North Africa, the Mediterranean and the Atlantic Saharan regions. The aim was achieved by a remote sensing experiment operated by the astronauts aboard the shuttle. Also, MEIDEX accomplished diverse secondary science objectives by performing slant visibility observations, sea-surface reflectivity observations, desert surface observations and observations of Transient Luminous Events, better known as sprites. MEIDEX also made the first space observation of a glory.

=== Shuttle Ozone Limb Sounding Experiment-02 (SOLSE-02) ===
SOLSE-2 was a hyperspectral imaging spectrometer built at the Goddard Space Flight Center that demonstrated a new technique to measure the vertical distribution of ozone in the atmosphere. The first demonstration flight of SOLSE-1 was on STS-87 in 1997. Once proven over a wider range of viewing conditions, the SOLSE-2 technique was incorporated to routinely measure ozone by the next generation of weather satellites, including the Ozone Mapping and Profiler Suite (OMPS), that was launched in 2011.

=== Critical Viscosity of Xenon-2 (CVX-2) ===
The Critical Viscosity of Xenon-2 Experiment measures the viscous behavior of xenon – a heavy, inert gas used in flash lamps and ion rocket engines – at its critical point.

The data from the CVX-2 experiment was believed lost in the disaster. The hard drive that carried its data, a Seagate ST9385AG 2.5" hard drive with 400 MB storage capacity, was found and believed to be melted beyond recognition. In 2008, however, a data recovery specialist cleaned the hard drive's storage platters and rebuilt them into a new hard drive. They were able to recover 99% of the data, saving the experiment.

=== Solar Constant Experiment-3 (SOLCON-3) ===
The SOLCON instrument is designed to accurately measure the solar constant and identify variations in the value during a solar cycle. SOLCON measures the solar irradiance in space to avoid perturbations by the atmosphere of the Earth. It is also used as a reference to construct a long-duration time series of the solar irradiance. This data will ensure continuity of the solar constant level obtained by instruments mounted on free flyers, over climate time-scale duration.

=== Space Experiment Module (SEM) ===
The SEM is made up of 11 separate student experiments from schools across the United States and is the 14th flight of a SEM on the Space Shuttle.

=== Low Power Transceiver (LPT) experiment ===
The Low Power Transceiver is a compact, flexible device that can be configured to perform custom communications and navigation functions in terrestrial, airborne and space applications. The LPT experiment was executed in conjunction with the Communications And Navigation Demonstration On Shuttle (CANDOS) experiment, which examined mobile IP in space.

== See also ==
- NASA
- Space Shuttle program
