= G-616 =

Scientific experiment

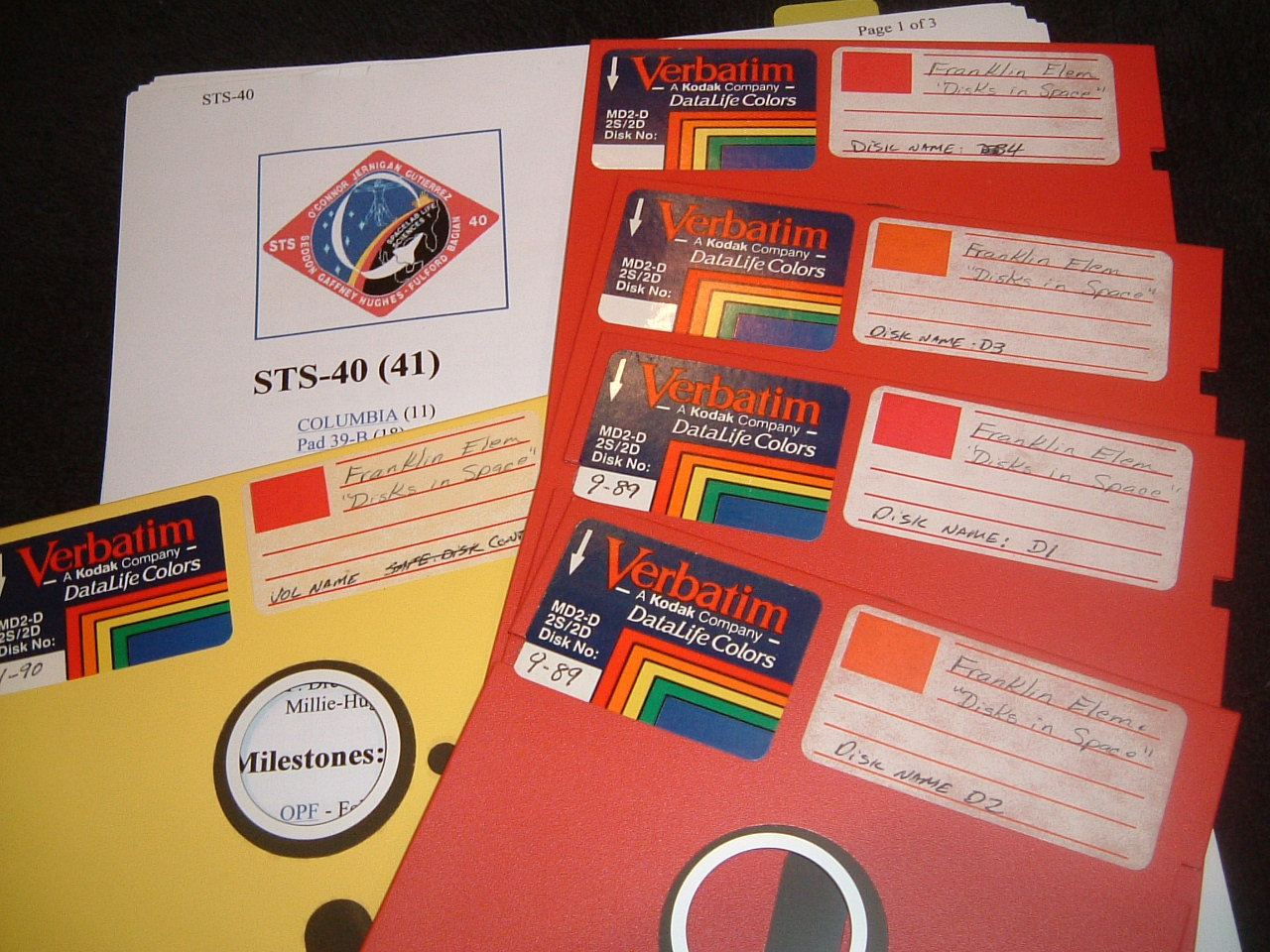
Disks flown on STS-40

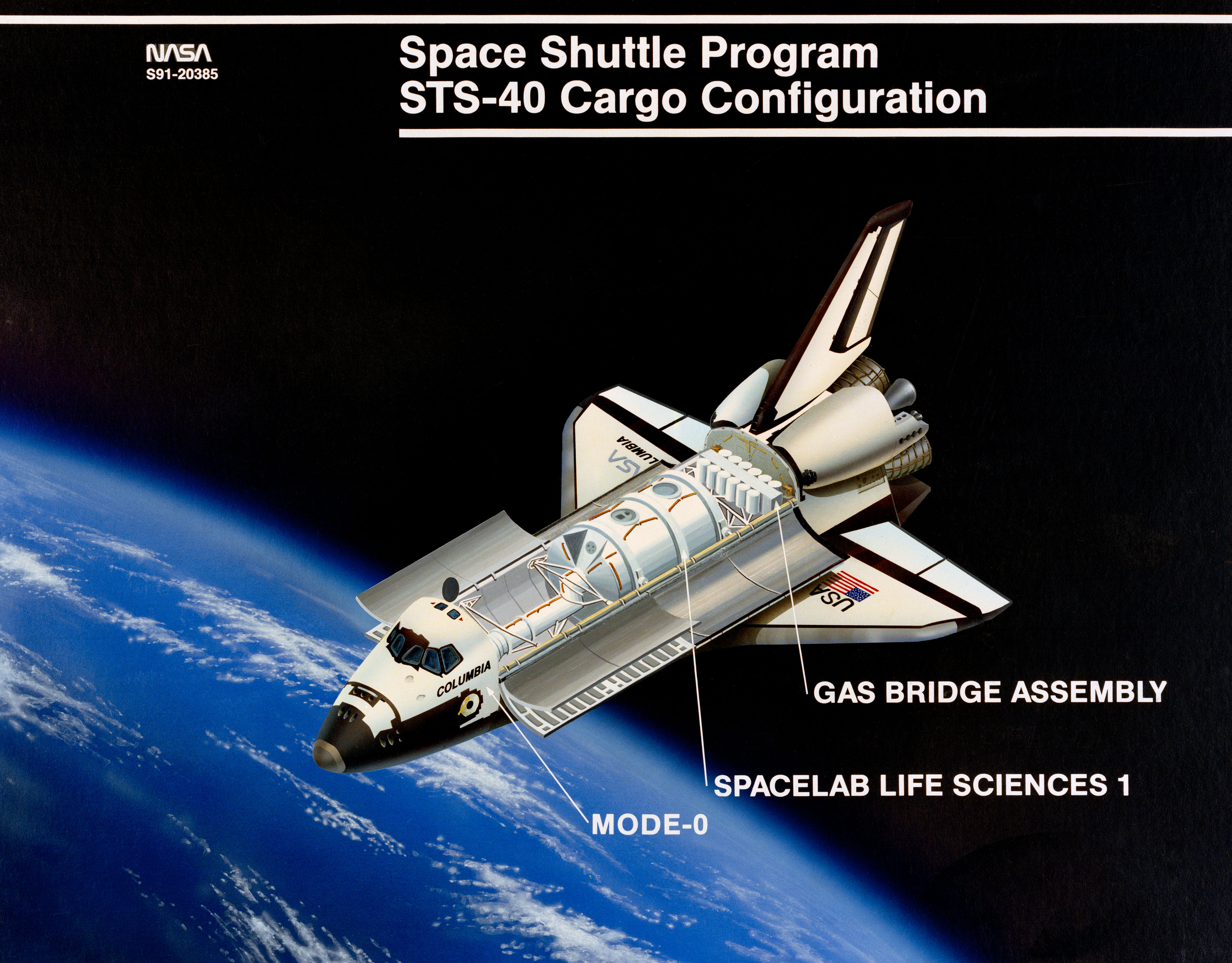
STS-40 Cargo Bay configuration

G-616, formally known as GAS canister #G-616: The Effect of Cosmic Radiation on Static Computer Media & Plant Seeds Exposure to Microgravity, was an experiment flown on the Space Shuttle as a self-contained experiment, as part of STS-40.

== Description ==
The Small Self-Contained Payload G-616 was managed and owned by Thomas M. Hancock III, a space scientist from Redlands, California. G-616 was assigned by NASA to Hancock in 1987. He developed and constructed the primary payload. It was approved for flight in 1988. G-616 originally consisted of three experiments:

1. A study on the effects of low Earth orbit on Space Shuttle External Tank foam – to assess if leaving an ET in space was feasible.
2. Static Computer Memory Integrity Testing (SCMIT) – looking for soft event upsets (bit-flips) in static computer media
3. Cultavor Microgravity Exposure (seeds in space). This experiment was to fly over two million seeds of 57 types from all over the world to orbit.

== History ==
Preflight testing at Goddard Space Flight Center demonstrated that 24% of the Space Shuttle External Tank foam sample outgassed in 24 hours. This was several hundred times over what was allowed for on-orbit operations. In addition, high UV radiation would break down the basic structure of the foam. Based on this information, the experiment was pulled prior to flight. The test answered the basic question: NASA cannot leave Space Shuttle External Tanks in orbit without creating significant debris. The other two experiments passed testing and payload safety data reviews in 1989.

In 1989, Hancock offered the Redlands Unified School District the chance to fly floppy disks and received over 1.5 million of the flown planet seeds for student instruction. Hancock worked with every school in the district in support of this effort. Furthermore, a contest was held for a student to develop a logo for this mission. It was flown on the outside of the payload canister during the mission.

The payload was integrated at Kennedy Space Center in early 1990 and was the first Shuttle Small Payload constructed and assembled for flight at KSC since the loss of the Space Shuttle Challenger in 1986.

Hydrogen leaking from the Space Shuttle main propulsion system delayed launch for over a year. During this time, the payload was stored on the GAS Bridge Assembly ready for flight at Hangar AF, NASA/KSC. On June 5, 1991, the payload was launched in the Space Shuttle Columbia as part of the STS-40's SpaceLab Life Sciences-1 mission.

The payload spent 9 days in orbit before landing at Edwards Air Force Base. The payload was recovered at KSC during the first week of July 1991. The disks flown for the students as part of Hancock's experiment, and over 1.5 million seeds, were presented to the Redlands Unified School District in August 1991.

== Results ==
Papers about the experiments were published in 1988, 1993, and 1999 at the Shuttle Small Payload Symposiums. A presentation on the results from both flights of the SCMIT experiment (STS-40 and STS-87) was presented at the US Naval Academy in 1999.

== See also ==
- Getaway Special
