= PUGAS =

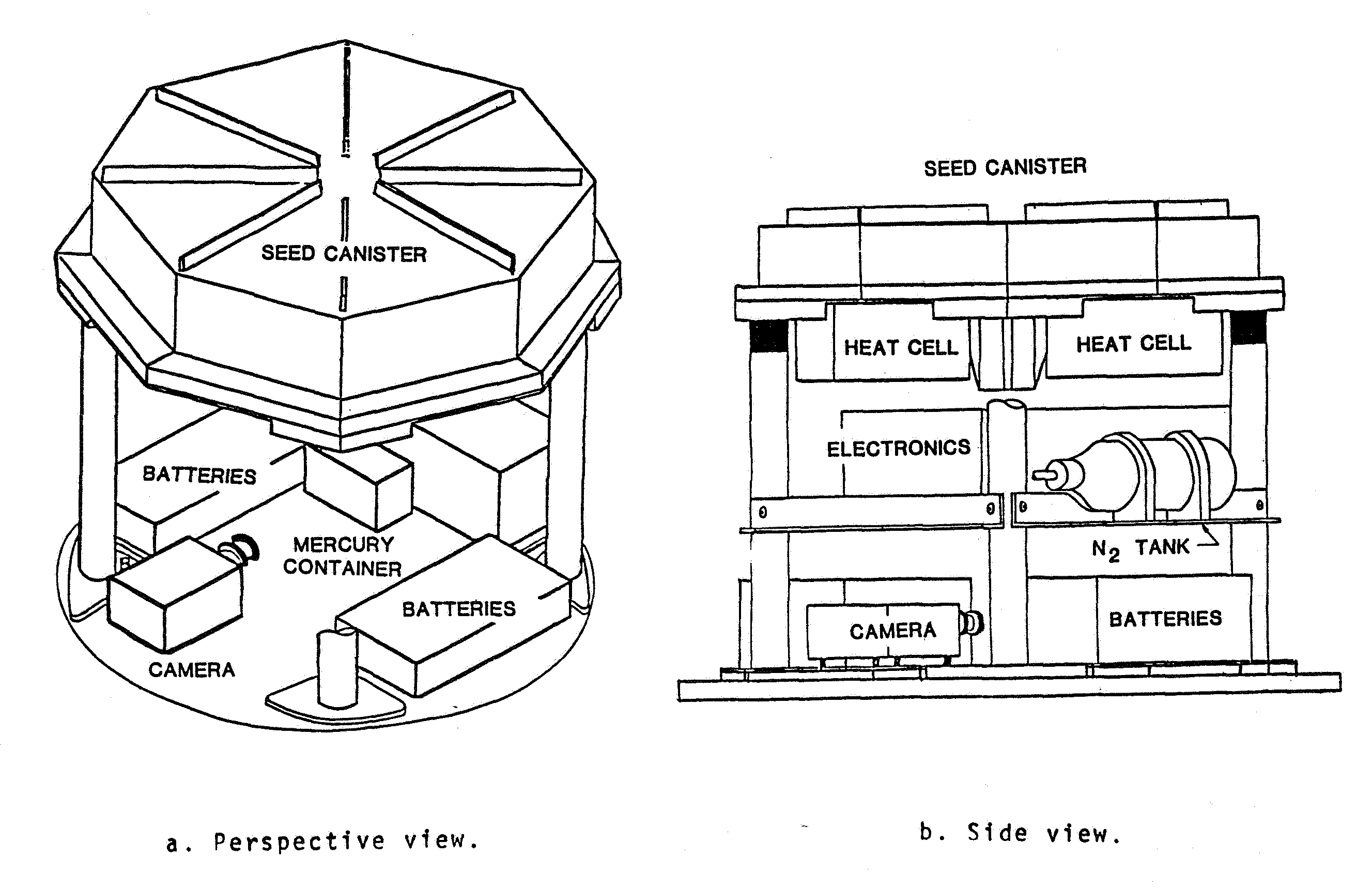
Schematic of PUGAS

PUGAS (Purdue University Getaway Special) was a student run experiment package that flew on NASA's STS-7 Space Shuttle Mission aboard the Space Shuttle Challenger launched 18 June 1983.

The official designation was G-009: Purdue University – Geotropism, Fluid Dynamics and Nuclear Particle Velocity. The Payload Manager was Dr. John T. Snow. The NASA Technical Manager was Richard Palace.

The device was designed to conduct three experiments, two of which failed. The first failed one was intended to test seed growth in microgravity in an unconventional way—by germinating seeds on a spinning disc. The degree of artificial gravity on the spinning wheel is highest (0.25 g or 2.5 m/s²) at its rim and lowest at its center. Using this fact, the influence of different levels of gravity on seed germination could be determined by placing seeds at different radial locations on the disk. At the end of the mission, the growth was to be arrested. After return the orientation of the roots were to be used to determine the threshold of gravity at which a plant could determine which way was down. A second failed experiment on fluid dynamics was intended to measure the bulk oscillations of a drop of mercury immersed in a clear liquid. A short circuit prevented the seed and mercury drop experiments from functioning.

The payload also included a nuclear particle detection experiment. This experiment was a success; it traced and recorded the paths of nuclear particles encountered in the near-Earth space environment.

Purdue's Schools of Science, Engineering, and Agriculture developed the flight hardware for the project, with the U.S. Navy providing access to the necessary test facilities at the Naval Surface Warfare Center Crane Division.

The experiment hardware is currently on display in the lobby of the A.A. Potter Engineering Center on the West Lafayette, Indiana campus of Purdue University.
