= Getaway Special =

NASA program for low-cost space experiments

Get Away Special (GAS)
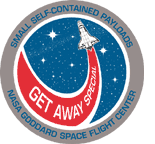
- Mission type: Various
- Operator: NASA
- Shuttle Small Payloads Project

Getaway Special was a NASA program that offered interested individuals, or groups, opportunities to fly small experiments aboard the Space Shuttle. Over the 20-year history of the program, over 170 individual missions were flown. The program, which was officially known as the Small, Self-Contained Payloads program, was canceled following the Space Shuttle Columbia disaster on February 1, 2003.

== History ==
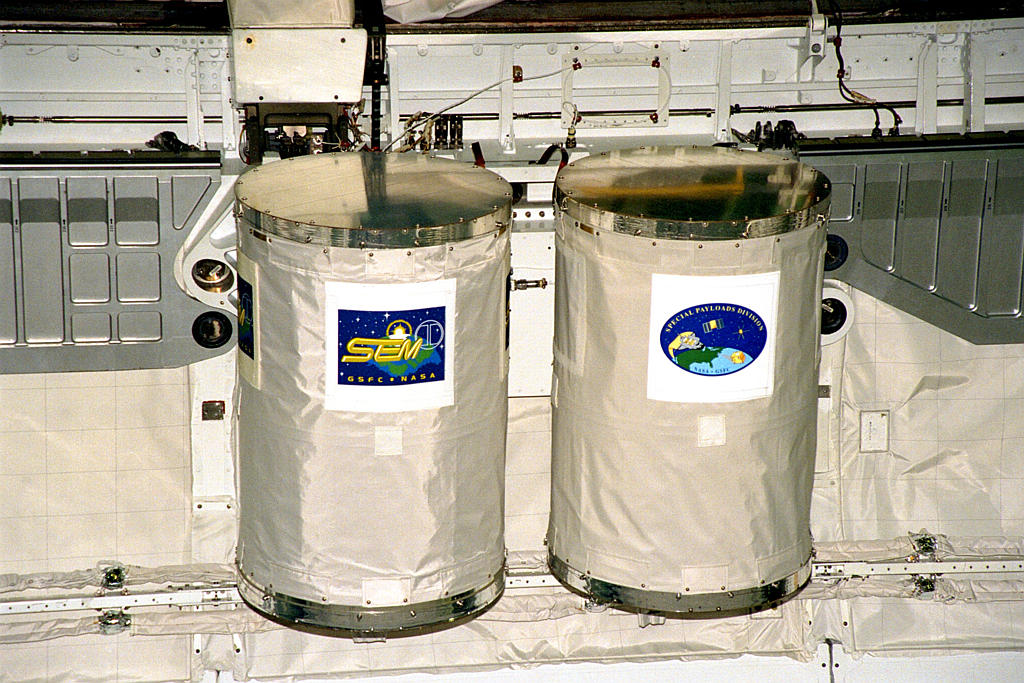
Two Getaway Special (GAS) canisters, used on STS-91

The program was conceived by NASA's Shuttle program manager John Yardley, and announced in the fall of 1976. The "Getaway Special" nickname originated from a special vacation fare for flights between Los Angeles and Honolulu being advertised by Trans World Airlines at the time around the program's conception.

The first Getaway Special was purchased by Gilbert Moore of Thiokol on October 12, 1976, and donated to Utah State University. It was flown on Columbia during STS-4 in June/July 1982. The program was canceled after the Space Shuttle Columbia disaster on February 1, 2003. The last Getaway Special, which was carried aboard STS-107, was the Freestar experiment package, which carried six different experiments. Much of the data was lost when Columbia was destroyed, but some data was transmitted during the mission.

After reorganization of the Shuttle Program, NASA cited the need for the remaining Shuttle fleet to complete assembly of the ISS to justify its decision to cancel the program. The GAS program canisters and GAS Bridge combined weight were only usable on low orbit missions, which were rescheduled with higher priority payloads. With payload and program limits set on the remaining Shuttle missions until the expected STS close-out in 2010, the GAS program was eliminated.

GAS Cans Per Year
Year	Cans Flown (Shuttle Flight)
1982	2(STS-4/5)
1983	14(STS-6/7/8)
1984	23(STS-41B/G)
1985	12(STS-51-D/B/G/61-A/B)
1986	12(STS-61-C)
1987	0
1988	0
1989	2(STS-28/34)
1990	0
1991	12(STS-40)
1992	20(STS-42/45/47)
1993	10(STS-57)
1994	20(STS-59/60/64)
1995	6(STS-67/68/69)
1996	15(STS-72/76/77)
1997	3(STS-85/87)
1998	16(STS-88/89/90/91/95)
1999	0
2000	1(STS-106)
2001	9(STS-102/105/108)
2003	6(STS-107)
Total	173

== Allocation ==
To assure that diverse groups would have access to space, NASA rotated GAS payload assignments among four major categories of users: educational, foreign, commercial, and U.S. government. GAS payloads had been reserved by foreign governments and individuals; U.S. industrialists, foundations, high schools, colleges and universities; professional societies; service clubs; and many others. Although persons and groups involved in space research obtained many of the reservations, a large number of spaces were reserved by persons and organizations outside the space community.

GAS requests were first approved at NASA Headquarters in Washington, D.C., by the director of the Transportation Services Office. At that point NASA screened the propriety and objectives of each request. To complete the reservation process for GAS payloads, each request was accompanied or preceded by the payment of $500. Approved requests were assigned an identification number and referred to the GAS team at the Goddard Space Flight Center in Greenbelt, Maryland, the designated lead center for the project. The GAS team screened the proposals for safety and provided advice and consultation on payload design. It certified that proposed payloads would be safe and would not harm or interfere with the operations of the space shuttle, its crew, or other experiments on the flight. The costs of any physical testing required to answer safety questions before launch were borne by the GAS customer.

== Requirements ==
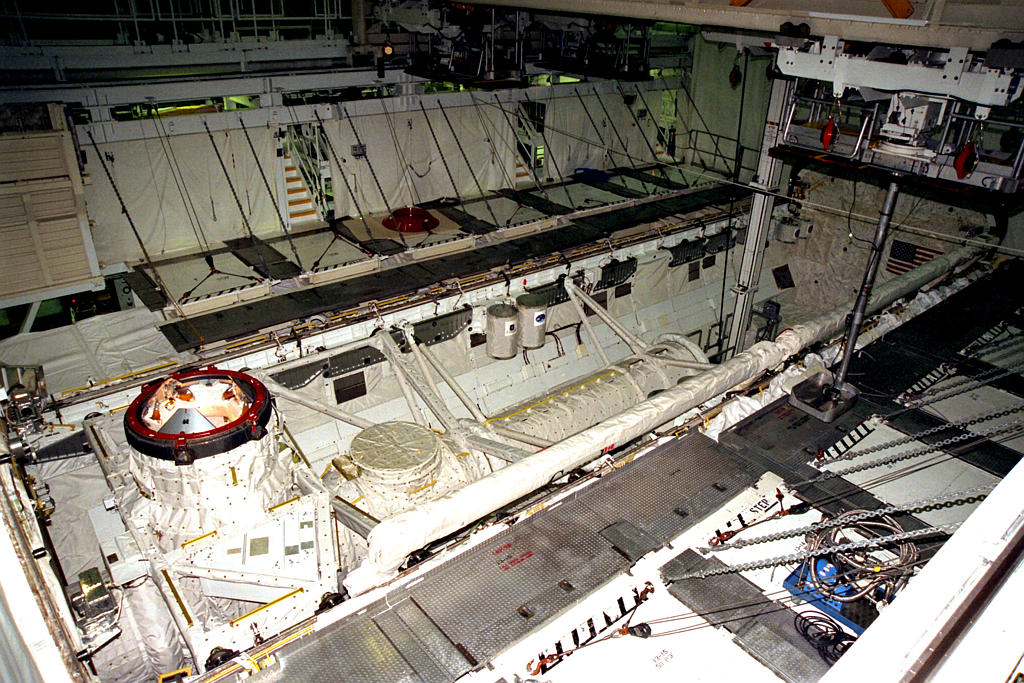
GAS canisters shown mounted in the Space Shuttle Discovery cargo bay. This image is from STS-91. The front of the Shuttle is to the left of the picture.

There were no stringent requirements to qualify for participation in the GAS program. However, each payload was required to meet specific safety criteria, have been screened for its propriety, as well as being evaluated for its educational, scientific or technological objectives. These guidelines preclude commemorative items, such as medallions, that are intended for sale as objects that have flown in space. NASA's Space Shuttle program had specific standards and conditions relating to GAS payloads. Payloads were required to have fit into NASA standard containers and weigh no more than 200 pounds (91 kg). Two or more experiments could have been included in a single container if they fit while not exceeding weight limitations. The payload must have been self-powered, as experiments could not draw on the Shuttle orbiter's electricity. In addition, the crew's involvement with GAS payloads was limited to six simple activities (such as turning on and off up to three payload switches), due to the fact that crew activity schedules do not provide opportunities to either monitor or service GAS payloads in flight.

The cost of this unique service depended on the size and weight of the experiment. Getaway specials of 200 pounds (91 kg) and 5 cubic feet (0.14 m^{3}) cost $10,000; 100 pounds (45 kg) and 2.5 cubic feet (0.071 m^{3}), $5,000; and 60 pounds (27 kg) and 2.5 cubic feet (0.071 m^{3}), $3,000. The weight of the GAS container, experiment mounting plate and its attachment screws, and all hardware regularly supplied by NASA was not charged to the experimenter's weight allowance.

The GAS container provided internal pressure, which could be varied from near vacuum to about one atmosphere. The bottom and sides of the container were always thermally insulated, and the top may have been insulated or not, depending on the specific experiment. A lid that could be opened, or one with a window, may be required, and were offered as options at additional cost. The GAS containers were made of aluminum, and the circular end plates are ^{5}/_{8} inch (16 mm) thick aluminum. The bottom 3 inches (76 mm) of the container were reserved for NASA interface equipment, such as command decoders and pressure regulating systems. The container was a pressure vessel that could be evacuated before or during launch, or on orbit, and could be re-pressurized during re-entry, or on orbit, as required by the experimenter.

The getaway bridge, which was capable of holding 12 canisters, made its maiden flight on STS-61-C. The aluminum bridge fit across the payload bay of the orbiter and offered a convenient and economic way of flying several GAS canisters.

== Example of GAS experiments ==
- STS-7 – Pugas
- STS-40 – G-616 Cosmic Radiation Effects on Floppy Disks
- STS-47 – Project POSTAR
- STS-61-C – 1986: Vertical Horizons (G-481)
  - Ellery Kurtz, artist, and Howard Wishnow, Project Coordinator. An art conservation experiment on board the Space Shuttle Columbia. Included in the canister as part of the experiment were four original oil paintings by Kurtz, and other artistic materials, in order to evaluate the effects of spaceflight on fine art materials.
- STS-91 – June 2, 1998 (G-743)

== Full list of experiments ==
Launch Date	STS Number	Payload Name	Payload Classification	Experiment Name	Payload Carrier Hardware
03/22/82	3	GAS FVP	GAS	GAS FVP	Adapter Beam
06/27/82	4	G-001	GAS	G-001	Adapter Beam
11/11/82	5	G-026	GAS	G-026	Adapter Beam
04/04/83	6	G-005; G-049; G-381	GAS	G-005; G-049; G-381	Adapter Beam
06/18/83	7	G-002; G-088; G-009; G-012; G-033; G-305; G-345	GAS	G-002; G-088; G-009; G-012; G-033; G-305; G-345	Adapter Beam
08/30/83	8	G-346; G-347; G-348; G-475	GAS	G-346; G-347; G-348; G-475	Adapter Beam
02/03/84	10 (41-B)	G-004; G-008; G-051; G-309; G-349	GAS	G-004; G-008; G-051; G-309; G-349	Adapter Beam
10/05/84	13 (41-G)	G-007; G-013; G-032; G-038; G-074; G-306; G-469; G-518	GAS	G-007; G-013; G-032; G-038; G-074; G-306; G-469; G-518	Adapter Beam
04/12/85	16 (51-D)	G-035; G-471	GAS	G-035; G-471	Adapter Beam
04/29//85	17 (51-B)	G-010; G-308	GAS	G-010; G-308	Adapter Beam
06/17/85	18 (51-G)	G-025; G-027; G-028; G-034; G-314; G-471	GAS	G-025; G-027; G-028; G-034; G-314; G-471	Adapter Beam
10/30/85	22 (61-A)	G-308	GAS	G-308	Adapter Beam
11/26/85	23 (61-B)	G-479	GAS	G-479	Adapter Beam
01/12/86	24 (61-C)	HHG-1	Hitchhiker (HH)	Particle Analysis Cameras for the Shuttle (PACS) Capillary Pump Loop (CPL)	Hitchhiker Bridge
01/12/86	24 (61-C)	GAS Bridge Assembly-1 (GBA-1)	GAS	G-007; G-062; G-310; G-332; G-446; G-449; G-462; G-463; G-464; G-470; G-481; G-494	GAS Bridge Assembly (GBA)
08/08/89	28	G-335; G-341	GAS	G-335; G-341	Adapter Beam
10/18/89	34	SSBUV-01	GAS	Shuttle Solar Background Ultraviolet (SSBUV)	Adapter Beam
12/02/90	35	BBXRT	HH	Broad Band X-Ray Telescope (BBXRT)	Adapter Beam
04/28/91	39	MPEC-01	CAP	Multi-Purpose Experiment Canister (MPEC)	Adapter Beam
04/28/91	39	STP-1	HH	Advanced Liquid Feed Experiment (ALFE), MDAC MDE/AFAL Data Systems Experiment (DSE), NASA GSFC Spacecraft Kinetic Infrared Test (SKIRT)-Circular Variable Filter(CVF) / GLOS Ultraviolet Limb Imaging Experiment (UVLIMB), NRL/USAF	Hitchhiker Bridge
06/05/91	40	GBA-2	GAS	G-021; G-052; G-091; G-105; G-286; G-405; G-408; G-451; G-455; G-486; G-507; G-616	GBA
01/22/92	42	GBA-3	GAS	G-086; G-140; G-143; G-329; G-336; G-337; G-457; G-609; G-610; G-614	GBA
08/02/91	43	TPCE-01	CAP	TPCE-01	Adapter Beam
03/24/92	45	G-229	GAS	G-229	Adapter Beam
07/31/92	46	CONCAP IV-03 CONCAP II-01 CONCAP III-01	CAP	LDCE-01 LDCE-02 LDCE-03	Adapter Beam
09/12/92	47	GBA-4	GAS	G-102; G-255; G-300; G-330; G-482; G-520; G-521; G-534; G-613	Adapter Beam
11/12/93	51	LDCE-04; LDCE-05	CAP	LDCE-04; LDCE-05	Adapter Beam
10/22/92	52	ASP	HH	Attitude Sensor Package (ASP)	Adapter Beam
10/22/92	52	TPCE-01	CAP	TPCE-01	Adapter Beam
12/02/92	53	GCP	HH	Orbital Debris Radar Calibration Spheres (ODERACS-1) Cryogenic Heat Pipe Experiment (CRYOHP) Shuttle Glow (GLO-1)	Adapter Beam
01/13/93	54	DXS	HH	Diffuse X-ray Spectrometer (DXS)	Adapter Beam
04/26/93	55	RKGM	CAP	RKGM	Adapter Beam
04/08/93	56	SUVE	CAP	SUVE	Adapter Beam
06/21/93	57	SHOOT	HH	Super Fluid Helium On Orbit Transfer (SHOOT)	Adapter Beam
06/21/93	57	GBA-5	GAS	CONCAP-IV-01; G-022; G-324; G-399; G-450; G-452; G-453; G-454; G-535; G-601; G-647	GBA
04/09/94	59	CONCAP IV-02	CAP	CONCAP IV-02	Adapter Beam
04/09/94	59	G-203; G-300; G-458	GAS	G-203; G-300; G-458	Adapter Beam
02/03/94	60	COB/GBA ODERACS-1R BREMSAT	GAS Bridge Assembly-6 with Hitchhiker Avionics	Capillary Pumped Loop (CAPL), NASA GSFC	GBA w/ HH Avionics
02/03/94	60	COB/GBA ODERACS-1R BREMSAT	HH	Orbital Debris Radar Calibration Spheres (ODERACS-1R), USAF	GBA w/ HH Avionics
02/03/94	60	COB/GBA ODERACS-1R BREMSAT	CAP	BREMAN Satellite (BREMSAT), University of Bremen	GBA w/ HH Avionics
02/03/94	60	COB/GBA ODERACS-1R BREMSAT	GAS	G-071; G-514; G-536; G-557	GBA w/ HH Avionics
03/04/94	62	LDCE-06 LDCE-07 LDCE-08	CAP	LDCE-06LDCE-07 LDCE-08	Adapter Beam
03/04/94	62	OAST-2	HH	Thermal Energy Storage (TES-1, TES-2) Cryogenic Two Phase (CRYOTP), NASA GSFC/USAF Phillips Lab Emulsion Chamber Technology (ECT), NASA MSFC Experimental Investigation of Spacecraft Glow (EISG), NASA JSC/NASA GSFC Solar Array Module Plasma Interaction Experiment (SAMPIE), NASA LeRC Spacecraft Kinetic Infrared Test (SKIRT), NASA JSC/NASA GSFC	HH Bridge
02/03/95	63	CGP/ODERACS-2	HH	Cryo System Experiment (CSE), Hughes Shuttle Glow (GLO-2), U of AZ IMAX Cargo Bay Camera (ICBC) Orbital Debris Radar Calibration System-II (ODERACS-II), USAF	HH Bridge
09/09/94	64	ROMPS-1	HH	Robot Operated Materials Processing System (ROMPS)	Adapter Beam
09/09/94	64	GBA-7	GAS	G-178; G-254; G-325; G-417; G-453; G-454; G-456; G-485; G-506; G-562	GBA
11/03/94	66	ESCAPE-2	CAP	ESCAPE-2	Adapter Beam
03/02/95	67	G-387; G-388	GAS	G-387; G-388	Adapter Beam
09/30/94	68	G-316; G-503; G-541	GAS	G-316; G-503; G-541	Adapter Beam
09/07/95	69	IEH-1	HH	Ultraviolet Spectrograph Telescope for Astronomical Research (UVSTAR), U of AZ/ESA Shuttle Glow Experiment-3 (GLO-3), U of AZ; Solar Extreme Ultraviolet HH (SEH), USC	HH Bridge
09/07/95	69	IEH-1	HH-Jr.	Complex Autonomous Payload (CONCAP IV-03), U of AL	HH Bridge
09/07/95	69	CAPL/GBA	HH	Capillary Pumped Loop (CAPL-2), NASA/GSFC	GBA
09/07/95	69	CAPL/GBA	CAP	TES-2	GBA
09/07/95	69	CAPL/GBA	GAS	G-515; G-645/SRE; G-702/SRE; G-726	GBA
01/11/96	72	SLA-01	HH	Shuttle Laser Altimeter-01 (SLA-01), NASA/GSFC	HH Bridge
01/11/96	72	SLA-01	CAP	TES-2	HH Bridge
01/11/96	72	SLA-01	GAS	G-342; G-459; G-740	HH Bridge
01/11/96	72	SLA-01	HH	Shuttle Laser Altimeter-01 (SLA-01), NASA/GSFC	HH Bridge
11/12/95	74	GPP	HH	Shuttle Glow Experiment (GLO-4) Photogrammetric Appendage Structural Dynamics Experiment Payload (PASDE-01)	Adapter Beam
03/22/96	76	G-312	GAS	G-312	Adapter Beam
05/19/96	77	TEAMS	HH	Vented Tank Resupply Experiment (VTRE), NASA/LeRC GPS Attitude and Navigation Experiment (GANE), NASA/JSC Liquid Metal Thermal Experiment (LMTE), USAF Phillips Laboratory Passive Aerodynamically-Stabilized Magnetically-Damped Satellite (PAMS), NASA GSFC	HH Bridge
05/19/96	77	TPCE-RF	CAP	TPCE-RF	GBA
05/19/96	77	G-056; G-063; G-142; G-144; G-163; G-200; G-490; G-564; G-565; G-703; G-741	GAS	G-056; G-063; G-142; G-144; G-163; G-200; G-490; G-564; G-565; G-703; G-741	GBA
11/19/96	80	SEM-01	SEM	SEM-01	Adapter Beam
04/04/97	83	CRYOFD	HH	Cryogenic Flexible Diode (CRYOFD), NASA GSFC/USAF Phillips Lab	Adapter Beam
08/07/97	85	TAS-01	HH	Shuttle Laser Altimeter (SLA-02), NASA GSFC Infrared Spectral Imaging Radiometer (ISIR), NASA GSFC Critical Viscosity of Xenon (CVX-01), NASA LeRC Space Experiment Module (SEM-02), NASA GSFC Solar Constant (SOLCON-1), Royal Meteorological Institute of Belgium Two-Phase Flow (TPF), NASA GSFC COOLLAR Flight Experiment (CFE), USAF Phillips Lab	HH Bridge
08/07/97	85	TAS-01	SEM	SEM-02	HH Bridge
08/07/97	85	IEH-2	HH	Ultraviolet Spectrograph Telescope for Astronomical Research (UVSTAR), U of AZ/ESA Shuttle Glow Experiment-5 & 6 (GLO-5 & 6), U of AZ Solar Extreme Ultraviolet Hitchhiker (SEH), USC Distribution and Automation Technology Advancement - Colorado Hitchhiker And Student Experiment of solar Radiation (DATA-CHASER), University of Colorado	HH Bridge
08/07/97	85	G-572; G-745	GAS	G-572; G-745	Adapter Beam
19/25/97	86	SEEDSII	CAP	SEEDSII	Adapter Beam
11/19/97	87	LHP/NaSBE (LNBP)	HH	Loop Heat Pipe Experiment (LHP), Dynatherm Sodium Surface Battery Experiment (NaSBE), NRL	Adapter Beam
11/19/97	87	SOLSE-01	HH-Jr	Shuttle Ozone Limb Sounding Experiment (SOLSE-01), NASA GSFC	Adapter Beam
11/19/97	87	TGDF	CAP	TGDF	Adapter Beam
11/19/97	87	G-036	GAS	G-036	Adapter Beam
12/04/98	88	MIGHTYSAT-1	HH	MightySat-1, USAF Phillips Lab Satellite de Aplicaciones Cientifico-A (SAC-A), Argentinean National Commission of Space Activities	Adapter Beam
12/04/98	88	JSC APFR	HH	JSC APFR	Adapter Beam
12/04/98	88	G-093R	GAS	G-093R	Adapter Beam
12/04/98	88	SEM-07	SEM	SEM-07	Adapter Beam
01/22/98	89	G-093; G-141; G-145; G-432	GAS	G-093; G-141; G-145; G-432	Adapter Beam
04/17/98	90	SVF-01	CAP	Shuttle Vibration Forces (SVF), NASA JPL	Adapter Beam
04/17/98	90	G-197; G-744; G-772	GAS	G-197; G-744; G-772	Adapter Beam
06/02/98	91	G-090; G-648; G-743; G-765	GAS	G-090; G-648; G-743; G-765	Adapter Beam
06/02/98	91	SEM-03; SEM-05	SEM	SEM-03; SEM-05	Adapter Beam
07/01/97	94	CRYOFD	HH	Cryogenic Flexible Diode (CRYOFD)	Adapter Beam
10/29/98	95	CRYOTSU	HH	Cryogenic Thermal Storage Unit (CRYOTSU), NASA GSFC	Adapter Beam
10/29/98	95	IEH-3	HH	Ultraviolet Spectrograph Telescope for Astronomical Research (UVSTAR), U of AZ/ESA Solar Extreme Ultraviolet Hitchhiker (SEH), USC STAR-LITE, U of AZ Petite Amateur Navy Satellite (PANSAT), USAF Space Test Program Solar Constant Experiment (SOLCON-02), Royal Meteorological Institute of Belgium	HH Bridge
10/29/98	95	IEH-3	GAS	G-238; G-764	HH Bridge
10/29/98	95	SEM-04	SEM	SEM-04	SEM-attached to SPARTAN 201-05 Bridge
10/29/98	95	G-467; G-779	GAS	G-467; G-779	Adapter Beam
05/27/99	96	SVF-02	CAP	Shuttle Vibration Forces (SVF-02), NASA JPL	Adapter Beam
05/27/99	95	STARSHINE	HH	Student Tracked Atmospheric Research Satellite for Heuristic International Networking Experiment (STARSHINE), Rocky Mountain NASA Space Grant Consortium/USU	Adapter Beam
05/19/00	101	MARS	CAP	MARS	Adapter Beam
05/19/00	101	SEM-06	SEM	SEM-06	Adapter Beam
03/08/01	102	WSVFM	CAP	Wide-band Shuttle Vibration Force Measurement (WSVFM), NASA JPL	Adapter Beam
03/08/01	102	G-783	GAS	G-783	Adapter Beam
03/08/01	102	SEM-09	SEM	SEM-09	Adapter Beam
03/08/01	102	Beam - Bay 4	Beam - Contingency I	Beam - Bay 4	Adapter Beam
08/10/01	105	HEAT	HH	Advance Carrier Equipment (ACE) SimpleSat, NASA/GSFC	Adapter Beam
08/10/01	105	HEAT	GAS	G-774	Adapter Beam
08/10/01	105	HEAT	SEM	SEM-10	Adapter Beam
08/10/01	105	G-780	GAS	G-780	Adapter Beam
08/10/01	105	HEAT	Beam - Bay 4 Port	Beam for Contingency	Adapter Beam
09/08/00	106	G-782	GAS	G-782	Adapter Beam
09/08/00	106	SEM-08	SEM	SEM-08	Adapter Beam
11/29/02	107	FREESTAR	HH	Mediterranean Israeli Dust Experiment (MEIDEX), Israeli Space Agency Solar Constant Experiment (SOLCON-03), Royal Meteorological Institute of Belgium Shuttle Ozone Limb Sounding Experiment (SOLSE-2), NASA GSFC Critical Viscosity of Xenon (CVX-2), NASA GRC Low Power Transceiver (LPT), NASA GSFC and ITT Industries SEM-14	HH Bridge
12/05/01	108	MACH-1	HH	CAPL-3, NASA GSFC and the Naval Research Laboratory STARSHINE-2, Rocky Mountain NASA Space Grant Consortium / USU Prototype Synchrotron Radiation Detector (PSRD), NASA JSC	GBA with HH Avionics
12/05/01	108	MACH-1	CAP	Collisions Into Dust Experiment (COLLIDE-2), NASA GRC	GBA with HH Avionics
12/05/01	108	MACH-1	GAS	G-761	GBA with HH Avionics
12/05/01	108	MACH-1	SEM	SEM-11; SEM-15	GBA with HH Avionics
12/05/01	108	LMC	LMC Carrier	SEM-12; G-064; G-730; G-785	LMC Carrier
12/05/01	108	G-221; G-775	GAS	G-221; G-775	Adapter Beam

Reference for this table:

== See also ==
- Hitchhiker Program – program run by the same office as the GAS Program (SSPP)
- Space Shuttle
