= F. Drew Gaffney =

American doctor and astronaut (born 1946)

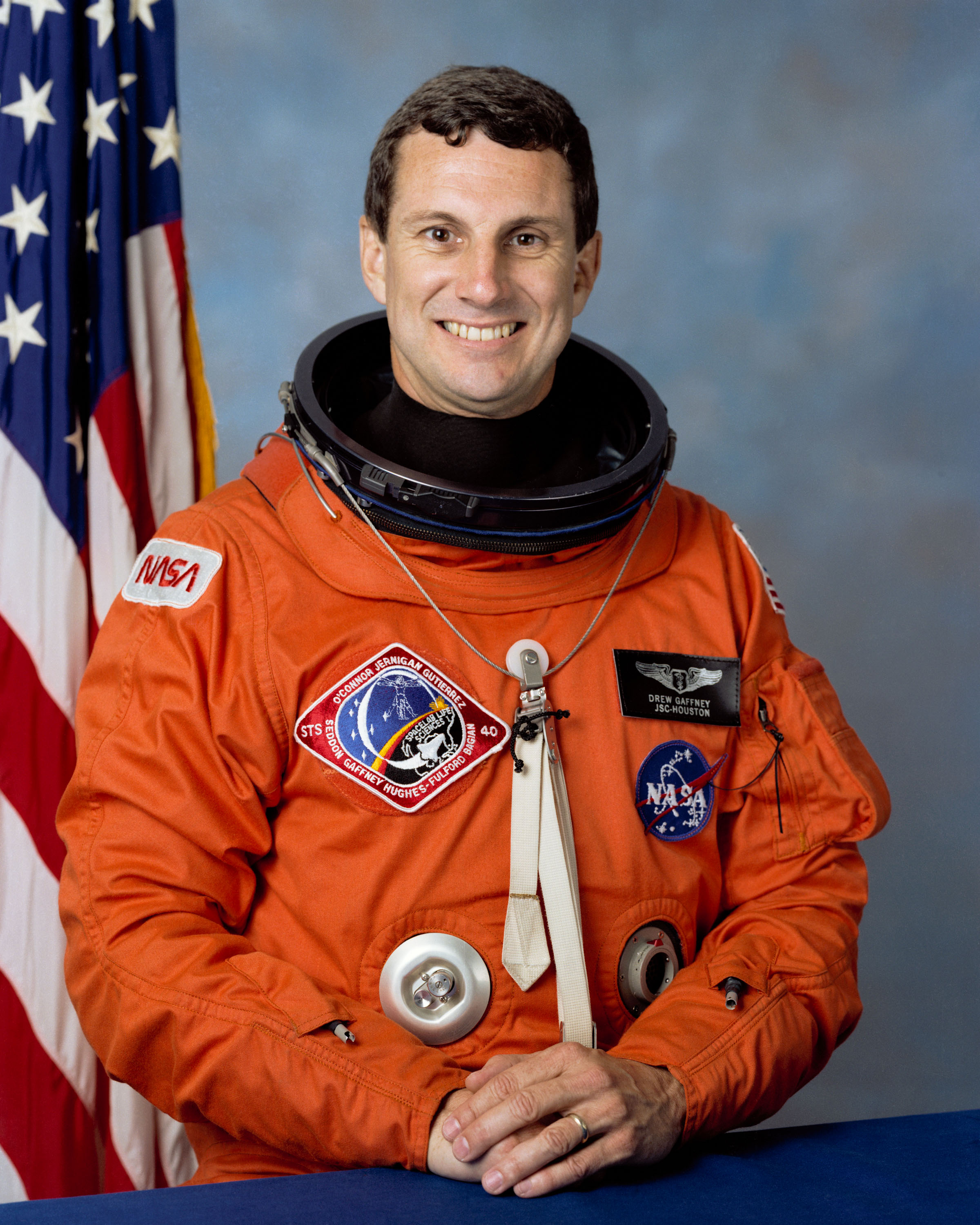
- Born: June 9, 1946 (age 80); Carlsbad, New Mexico, U.S.
- Education: University of California, Berkeley (BA); University of New Mexico (MD)
- Occupation: Medical Doctor
- Space career

NASA Payload Specialist
- Time in space: 9d 2h 14m
- Missions: STS-40

Francis Andrew "Drew" Gaffney is an American doctor and former astronaut. He previously worked for NASA and participated in the STS-40 Space Life Sciences (SLS 1) Space Shuttle mission in 1991 as a payload specialist.

Gaffney was a co-investigator on an experiment that studied human cardiovascular adaption to space flight. The SLS-1 mission crew completed over 18 experiments in nine days, bringing back more medical data than any previous NASA flight.

Dr. Gaffney became a member of the Institute of Medicine’s Committee on Space Biology and Medicine, serving from 1992 to 2000. He is a professor of medicine (cardiovascular disease) at Vanderbilt University and continues to serve as a consultant and reviewer for human spaceflight-related studies.

He is currently a professor of medicine at Vanderbilt University. Gaffney has over 50 publications in the areas of cardiovascular regulation and space physiology.

== Biography ==
Gaffney was born June 9, 1946, in Carlsbad, New Mexico. He has two daughters.

Gaffney graduated from Carlsbad, New Mexico High School in 1964; received a Bachelor of Arts degree from the University of California, Berkeley in 1968; and a Doctor of Medicine degree, University of New Mexico in 1972.

A Colonel in the Texas Air National Guard, Gaffney served as a Flight Surgeon for the 147th Fighter Interceptor Group at Ellington Air National Guard Base, Houston, Texas.

Gaffney served as a Visiting Senior Scientist with the Life Sciences Division at NASA Headquarters from January 1987 through June 1989. He worked with the Operational Medicine group and was Associate Manager of Biomedical Research as well as Program Scientist for the D-2 Spacelab mission and the Research Animal Holding Facility. He was a member of several working groups and implementation teams planning collaborative research with German, French and Soviet government scientists. He also served on a number of Space Station Freedom and advanced mission planning groups including the "Humans to Mars" study group.

Gaffney's 15 years of experience in cardiac research and operation of equipment such as echocardiograms and rebreathing devices led to his being selected as a payload specialist aboard STS-40 Spacelab Life Sciences (SLS 1), a mission which took place in June 1991. STS-40 was the first Spacelab mission dedicated to biomedical studies. The SLS-1 mission flew over 3.2 million miles in 146 orbits and its crew completed over 18 experiments in nine days, bringing back more medical data than any previous NASA flight. Mission duration was 218 hours, 14 minutes and 20 seconds.
