= Hitchhiker Program =

Shuttle-borne experimentation program by NASA

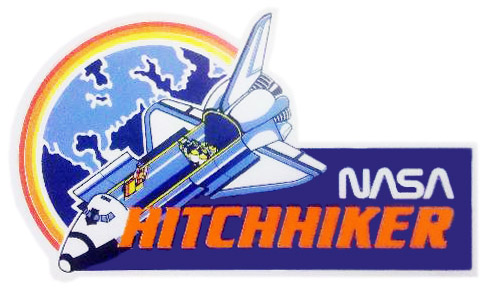
Hitchhiker program insignia

The Hitchhiker Program (HH) was a NASA program established in 1984 and administered by the Goddard Space Flight Center (GSFC) and the Marshall Space Flight Center (MSFC). The program was designed to allow low-cost and quick reactive experiments to be placed on board the Space Shuttle. The program was discontinued after the Space Shuttle Columbia disaster of STS-107.

== Program history ==
NASA's Hitchhiker project began in early 1984. It was created to accommodate small attached payloads in the Space Shuttle payload bay. Hitchhikers were intended for customers whose space activity requires power, data or command services.

The first Hitchhiker launched on STS-61-C on January 12, 1986. Called HHG-1, it was mounted to the side of the payload bay and carried three experiments. The second Hitchhiker launched on STS-39 on April 28, 1991. This payload was called Space Test Payload (STP)-1 and consisted of five experiments mounted onto a cross-bay carrier. Between 1992 and 1995, 12 Hitchhikers were manifested to fly on the Space Shuttle.

The Hitchhiker system provided real-time communications between the payload and customers in the Hitchhiker control center at Goddard Space Flight Center, Greenbelt, Maryland. The system also provided crew control/display capability, if necessary. Hitchhikers were created to provide a quick reaction and low cost capability for flying small payloads in the Shuttle payload bay.

Along with NASA's Get Away Specials (GAS), Hitchhiker was developed and operated by the Goddard Space Flight Center Shuttle Small Payloads Project (SSPP). Unlike Hitchhikers, GAS payloads were only mounted in canisters, did not connect to orbiter electrical services and did not require significant Shuttle support.

== Hitchhiker experiments ==
Hitchhiker experiments were housed in canisters or attached to mounting plates. The Hitchhiker canister came in two varieties—the Hitchhiker Motorized Door Canister and the Sealed Canisters. The Hitchhiker Motorized Door Canister had mechanical interfaces nearly identical to a GAS canister and could accommodate a customer payload of up to 160 pounds (72.6 kilograms). This canister allowed a payload to be exposed directly to the environment of space.

The Sealed Canister, without a door, could accommodate a customer payload up to 200 pounds (90.7 kilograms). The payload in this canister was sealed in an atmosphere of nitrogen or air.

Experiments attached to mounting plates could be placed on the vertical plate, a 25 inches (63.5 centimeters) by 39 inches (99.1 centimeters) mounting surface for up to 200 pounds (90.7 kilograms) of customer hardware. A larger mounting plate measured 50 inches (127 centimeters) by 60 inches (152.4 centimeters). This plate, available for use on the side-mount carrier, was for larger experiments or hardware requirements. Customer hardware mounted on plates may have needed additional customer-provided thermal control provisions, such as heaters or blankets.

== List of all Hitchhiker and GAS experiments ==
Launch Date	STS Number	Payload Name	Payload Classification	Experiment Name	Payload Carrier Hardware
03/22/82	3	GAS FVP	GAS	GAS FVP	Adapter Beam
06/27/82	4	G-001	GAS	G-001	Adapter Beam
11/11/82	5	G-026	GAS	G-026	Adapter Beam
04/04/83	6	G-005; G-049; G-381	GAS	G-005; G-049; G-381	Adapter Beam
06/18/83	7	G-002; G-088; G-009; G-012; G-033; G-305; G-345	GAS	G-002; G-088; G-009; G-012; G-033; G-305; G-345	Adapter Beam
08/30/83	8	G-346; G-347; G-348; G-475	GAS	G-346; G-347; G-348; G-475	Adapter Beam
02/03/84	10 (41-B)	G-004; G-008; G-051; G-309; G-349	GAS	G-004; G-008; G-051; G-309; G-349	Adapter Beam
10/05/84	13 (41-G)	G-007; G-013; G-032; G-038; G-074; G-306; G-469; G-518	GAS	G-007; G-013; G-032; G-038; G-074; G-306; G-469; G-518	Adapter Beam
04/12/85	16 (51-D)	G-035; G-471	GAS	G-035; G-471	Adapter Beam
04/29//85	17 (51-B)	G-010; G-308	GAS	G-010; G-308	Adapter Beam
06/17/85	18 (51-G)	G-025; G-027; G-028; G-034; G-314; G-471	GAS	G-025; G-027; G-028; G-034; G-314; G-471	Adapter Beam
10/30/85	22 (61-A)	G-308	GAS	G-308	Adapter Beam
11/26/85	23 (61-B)	G-479	GAS	G-479	Adapter Beam
01/12/86	24 (61-C)	HHG-1	Hitchhiker (HH)	Particle Analysis Cameras for the Shuttle (PACS) Capillary Pump Loop (CPL)	Hitchhiker Bridge
01/12/86	24 (61-C)	GAS Bridge Assembly-1 (GBA-1)	GAS	G-007; G-062; G-310; G-332; G-446; G-449; G-462; G-463; G-464; G-470; G-481; G-494	GAS Bridge Assembly (GBA)
08/08/89	28	G-335; G-341	GAS	G-335; G-341	Adapter Beam
10/18/89	34	SSBUV-01	GAS	Shuttle Solar Background Ultraviolet (SSBUV)	Adapter Beam
12/02/90	35	BBXRT	HH	Broad Band X-Ray Telescope (BBXRT)	Adapter Beam
04/28/91	39	MPEC-01	CAP	Multi-Purpose Experiment Canister (MPEC)	Adapter Beam
04/28/91	39	STP-1	HH	Advanced Liquid Feed Experiment (ALFE), MDAC MDE/AFAL Data Systems Experiment (DSE), NASA GSFC Spacecraft Kinetic Infrared Test (SKIRT)-Circular Variable Filter(CVF) / GLOS Ultraviolet Limb Imaging Experiment (UVLIMB), NRL/USAF	Hitchhiker Bridge
06/05/91	40	GBA-2	GAS	G-021; G-052; G-091; G-105; G-286; G-405; G-408; G-451; G-455; G-486; G-507; G-616	GBA
01/22/92	42	GBA-3	GAS	G-086; G-140; G-143; G-329; G-336; G-337; G-457; G-609; G-610; G-614	GBA
08/02/91	43	TPCE-01	CAP	TPCE-01	Adapter Beam
03/24/92	45	G-229	GAS	G-229	Adapter Beam
07/31/92	46	CONCAP IV-03 CONCAP II-01 CONCAP III-01	CAP	LDCE-01 LDCE-02 LDCE-03	Adapter Beam
09/12/92	47	GBA-4	GAS	G-102; G-255; G-300; G-330; G-482; G-520; G-521; G-534; G-613	Adapter Beam
11/12/93	51	LDCE-04; LDCE-05	CAP	LDCE-04; LDCE-05	Adapter Beam
10/22/92	52	ASP	HH	Attitude Sensor Package (ASP)	Adapter Beam
10/22/92	52	TPCE-01	CAP	TPCE-01	Adapter Beam
12/02/92	53	GCP	HH	Orbital Debris Radar Calibration Spheres (ODERACS-1) Cryogenic Heat Pipe Experiment (CRYOHP) Shuttle Glow (GLO-1)	Adapter Beam
01/13/93	54	DXS	HH	Diffuse X-ray Spectrometer (DXS)	Adapter Beam
04/26/93	55	RKGM	CAP	RKGM	Adapter Beam
04/08/93	56	SUVE	CAP	SUVE	Adapter Beam
06/21/93	57	SHOOT	HH	Super Fluid Helium On Orbit Transfer (SHOOT)	Adapter Beam
06/21/93	57	GBA-5	GAS	CONCAP-IV-01; G-022; G-324; G-399; G-450; G-452; G-453; G-454; G-535; G-601; G-647	GBA
04/09/94	59	CONCAP IV-02	CAP	CONCAP IV-02	Adapter Beam
04/09/94	59	G-203; G-300; G-458	GAS	G-203; G-300; G-458	Adapter Beam
02/03/94	60	COB/GBA ODERACS-1R BREMSAT	GAS Bridge Assembly-6 with Hitchhiker Avionics	Capillary Pumped Loop (CAPL), NASA GSFC	GBA w/ HH Avionics
02/03/94	60	COB/GBA ODERACS-1R BREMSAT	HH	Orbital Debris Radar Calibration Spheres (ODERACS-1R), USAF	GBA w/ HH Avionics
02/03/94	60	COB/GBA ODERACS-1R BREMSAT	CAP	BREMAN Satellite (BREMSAT), University of Bremen	GBA w/ HH Avionics
02/03/94	60	COB/GBA ODERACS-1R BREMSAT	GAS	G-071; G-514; G-536; G-557	GBA w/ HH Avionics
03/04/94	62	LDCE-06 LDCE-07 LDCE-08	CAP	LDCE-06LDCE-07 LDCE-08	Adapter Beam
03/04/94	62	OAST-2	HH	Thermal Energy Storage (TES-1, TES-2) Cryogenic Two Phase (CRYOTP), NASA GSFC/USAF Phillips Lab Emulsion Chamber Technology (ECT), NASA MSFC Experimental Investigation of Spacecraft Glow (EISG), NASA JSC/NASA GSFC Solar Array Module Plasma Interaction Experiment (SAMPIE), NASA LeRC Spacecraft Kinetic Infrared Test (SKIRT), NASA JSC/NASA GSFC	HH Bridge
02/03/95	63	CGP/ODERACS-2	HH	Cryo System Experiment (CSE), Hughes Shuttle Glow (GLO-2), U of AZ IMAX Cargo Bay Camera (ICBC) Orbital Debris Radar Calibration System-II (ODERACS-II), USAF	HH Bridge
09/09/94	64	ROMPS-1	HH	Robot Operated Materials Processing System (ROMPS)	Adapter Beam
09/09/94	64	GBA-7	GAS	G-178; G-254; G-325; G-417; G-453; G-454; G-456; G-485; G-506; G-562	GBA
11/03/94	66	ESCAPE-2	CAP	ESCAPE-2	Adapter Beam
03/02/95	67	G-387; G-388	GAS	G-387; G-388	Adapter Beam
09/30/94	68	G-316; G-503; G-541	GAS	G-316; G-503; G-541	Adapter Beam
09/07/95	69	IEH-1	HH	Ultraviolet Spectrograph Telescope for Astronomical Research (UVSTAR), U of AZ/ESA Shuttle Glow Experiment-3 (GLO-3), U of AZ; Solar Extreme Ultraviolet HH (SEH), USC	HH Bridge
09/07/95	69	IEH-1	HH-Jr.	Complex Autonomous Payload (CONCAP IV-03), U of AL	HH Bridge
09/07/95	69	CAPL/GBA	HH	Capillary Pumped Loop (CAPL-2), NASA/GSFC	GBA
09/07/95	69	CAPL/GBA	CAP	TES-2	GBA
09/07/95	69	CAPL/GBA	GAS	G-515; G-645/SRE; G-702/SRE; G-726	GBA
01/11/96	72	SLA-01	HH	Shuttle Laser Altimeter-01 (SLA-01), NASA/GSFC	HH Bridge
01/11/96	72	SLA-01	CAP	TES-2	HH Bridge
01/11/96	72	SLA-01	GAS	G-342; G-459; G-740	HH Bridge
01/11/96	72	SLA-01	HH	Shuttle Laser Altimeter-01 (SLA-01), NASA/GSFC	HH Bridge
11/12/95	74	GPP	HH	Shuttle Glow Experiment (GLO-4) Photogrammetric Appendage Structural Dynamics Experiment Payload (PASDE-01)	Adapter Beam
03/22/96	76	G-312	GAS	G-312	Adapter Beam
05/19/96	77	TEAMS	HH	Vented Tank Resupply Experiment (VTRE), NASA/LeRC GPS Attitude and Navigation Experiment (GANE), NASA/JSC Liquid Metal Thermal Experiment (LMTE), USAF Phillips Laboratory Passive Aerodynamically-Stabilized Magnetically-Damped Satellite (PAMS), NASA GSFC	HH Bridge
05/19/96	77	TPCE-RF	CAP	TPCE-RF	GBA
05/19/96	77	G-056; G-063; G-142; G-144; G-163; G-200; G-490; G-564; G-565; G-703; G-741	GAS	G-056; G-063; G-142; G-144; G-163; G-200; G-490; G-564; G-565; G-703; G-741	GBA
11/19/96	80	SEM-01	SEM	SEM-01	Adapter Beam
04/04/97	83	CRYOFD	HH	Cryogenic Flexible Diode (CRYOFD), NASA GSFC/USAF Phillips Lab	Adapter Beam
08/07/97	85	TAS-01	HH	Shuttle Laser Altimeter (SLA-02), NASA GSFC Infrared Spectral Imaging Radiometer (ISIR), NASA GSFC Critical Viscosity of Xenon (CVX-01), NASA LeRC Space Experiment Module (SEM-02), NASA GSFC Solar Constant (SOLCON-1), Royal Meteorological Institute of Belgium Two-Phase Flow (TPF), NASA GSFC COOLLAR Flight Experiment (CFE), USAF Phillips Lab	HH Bridge
08/07/97	85	TAS-01	SEM	SEM-02	HH Bridge
08/07/97	85	IEH-2	HH	Ultraviolet Spectrograph Telescope for Astronomical Research (UVSTAR), U of AZ/ESA Shuttle Glow Experiment-5 & 6 (GLO-5 & 6), U of AZ Solar Extreme Ultraviolet Hitchhiker (SEH), USC Distribution and Automation Technology Advancement - Colorado Hitchhiker And Student Experiment of solar Radiation (DATA-CHASER), University of Colorado	HH Bridge
08/07/97	85	G-572; G-745	GAS	G-572; G-745	Adapter Beam
19/25/97	86	SEEDSII	CAP	SEEDSII	Adapter Beam
11/19/97	87	LHP/NaSBE (LNBP)	HH	Loop Heat Pipe Experiment (LHP), Dynatherm Sodium Surface Battery Experiment (NaSBE), NRL	Adapter Beam
11/19/97	87	SOLSE-01	HH-Jr	Shuttle Ozone Limb Sounding Experiment (SOLSE-01), NASA GSFC	Adapter Beam
11/19/97	87	TGDF	CAP	TGDF	Adapter Beam
11/19/97	87	G-036	GAS	G-036	Adapter Beam
12/04/98	88	MIGHTYSAT-1	HH	MightySat-1, USAF Phillips Lab Satellite de Aplicaciones Cientifico-A (SAC-A), Argentinean National Commission of Space Activities	Adapter Beam
12/04/98	88	JSC APFR	HH	JSC APFR	Adapter Beam
12/04/98	88	G-093R	GAS	G-093R	Adapter Beam
12/04/98	88	SEM-07	SEM	SEM-07	Adapter Beam
01/22/98	89	G-093; G-141; G-145; G-432	GAS	G-093; G-141; G-145; G-432	Adapter Beam
04/17/98	90	SVF-01	CAP	Shuttle Vibration Forces (SVF), NASA JPL	Adapter Beam
04/17/98	90	G-197; G-744; G-772	GAS	G-197; G-744; G-772	Adapter Beam
06/02/98	91	G-090; G-648; G-743; G-765	GAS	G-090; G-648; G-743; G-765	Adapter Beam
06/02/98	91	SEM-03; SEM-05	SEM	SEM-03; SEM-05	Adapter Beam
07/01/97	94	CRYOFD	HH	Cryogenic Flexible Diode (CRYOFD)	Adapter Beam
10/29/98	95	CRYOTSU	HH	Cryogenic Thermal Storage Unit (CRYOTSU), NASA GSFC	Adapter Beam
10/29/98	95	IEH-3	HH	Ultraviolet Spectrograph Telescope for Astronomical Research (UVSTAR), U of AZ/ESA Solar Extreme Ultraviolet Hitchhiker (SEH), USC STAR-LITE, U of AZ Petite Amateur Navy Satellite (PANSAT), USAF Space Test Program Solar Constant Experiment (SOLCON-02), Royal Meteorological Institute of Belgium	HH Bridge
10/29/98	95	IEH-3	GAS	G-238; G-764	HH Bridge
10/29/98	95	SEM-04	SEM	SEM-04	SEM-attached to SPARTAN 201-05 Bridge
10/29/98	95	G-467; G-779	GAS	G-467; G-779	Adapter Beam
05/27/99	96	SVF-02	CAP	Shuttle Vibration Forces (SVF-02), NASA JPL	Adapter Beam
05/27/99	95	STARSHINE	HH	Student Tracked Atmospheric Research Satellite for Heuristic International Networking Experiment (STARSHINE), Rocky Mountain NASA Space Grant Consortium/USU	Adapter Beam
05/19/00	101	MARS	CAP	MARS	Adapter Beam
05/19/00	101	SEM-06	SEM	SEM-06	Adapter Beam
03/08/01	102	WSVFM	CAP	Wide-band Shuttle Vibration Force Measurement (WSVFM), NASA JPL	Adapter Beam
03/08/01	102	G-783	GAS	G-783	Adapter Beam
03/08/01	102	SEM-09	SEM	SEM-09	Adapter Beam
03/08/01	102	Beam - Bay 4	Beam - Contingency I	Beam - Bay 4	Adapter Beam
08/10/01	105	HEAT	HH	Advance Carrier Equipment (ACE) SimpleSat, NASA/GSFC	Adapter Beam
08/10/01	105	HEAT	GAS	G-774	Adapter Beam
08/10/01	105	HEAT	SEM	SEM-10	Adapter Beam
08/10/01	105	G-780	GAS	G-780	Adapter Beam
08/10/01	105	HEAT	Beam - Bay 4 Port	Beam for Contingency	Adapter Beam
09/08/00	106	G-782	GAS	G-782	Adapter Beam
09/08/00	106	SEM-08	SEM	SEM-08	Adapter Beam
11/29/02	107	FREESTAR	HH	Mediterranean Israeli Dust Experiment (MEIDEX), Israeli Space Agency Solar Constant Experiment (SOLCON-03), Royal Meteorological Institute of Belgium Shuttle Ozone Limb Sounding Experiment (SOLSE-2), NASA GSFC Critical Viscosity of Xenon (CVX-2), NASA GRC Low Power Transceiver (LPT), NASA GSFC and ITT Industries SEM-14	HH Bridge
12/05/01	108	MACH-1	HH	CAPL-3, NASA GSFC and the Naval Research Laboratory STARSHINE-2, Rocky Mountain NASA Space Grant Consortium / USU Prototype Synchrotron Radiation Detector (PSRD), NASA JSC	GBA with HH Avionics
12/05/01	108	MACH-1	CAP	Collisions Into Dust Experiment (COLLIDE-2), NASA GRC	GBA with HH Avionics
12/05/01	108	MACH-1	GAS	G-761	GBA with HH Avionics
12/05/01	108	MACH-1	SEM	SEM-11; SEM-15	GBA with HH Avionics
12/05/01	108	LMC	LMC Carrier	SEM-12; G-064; G-730; G-785	LMC Carrier
12/05/01	108	G-221; G-775	GAS	G-221; G-775	Adapter Beam

Reference for this table:

== Hitchhiker carrier system ==
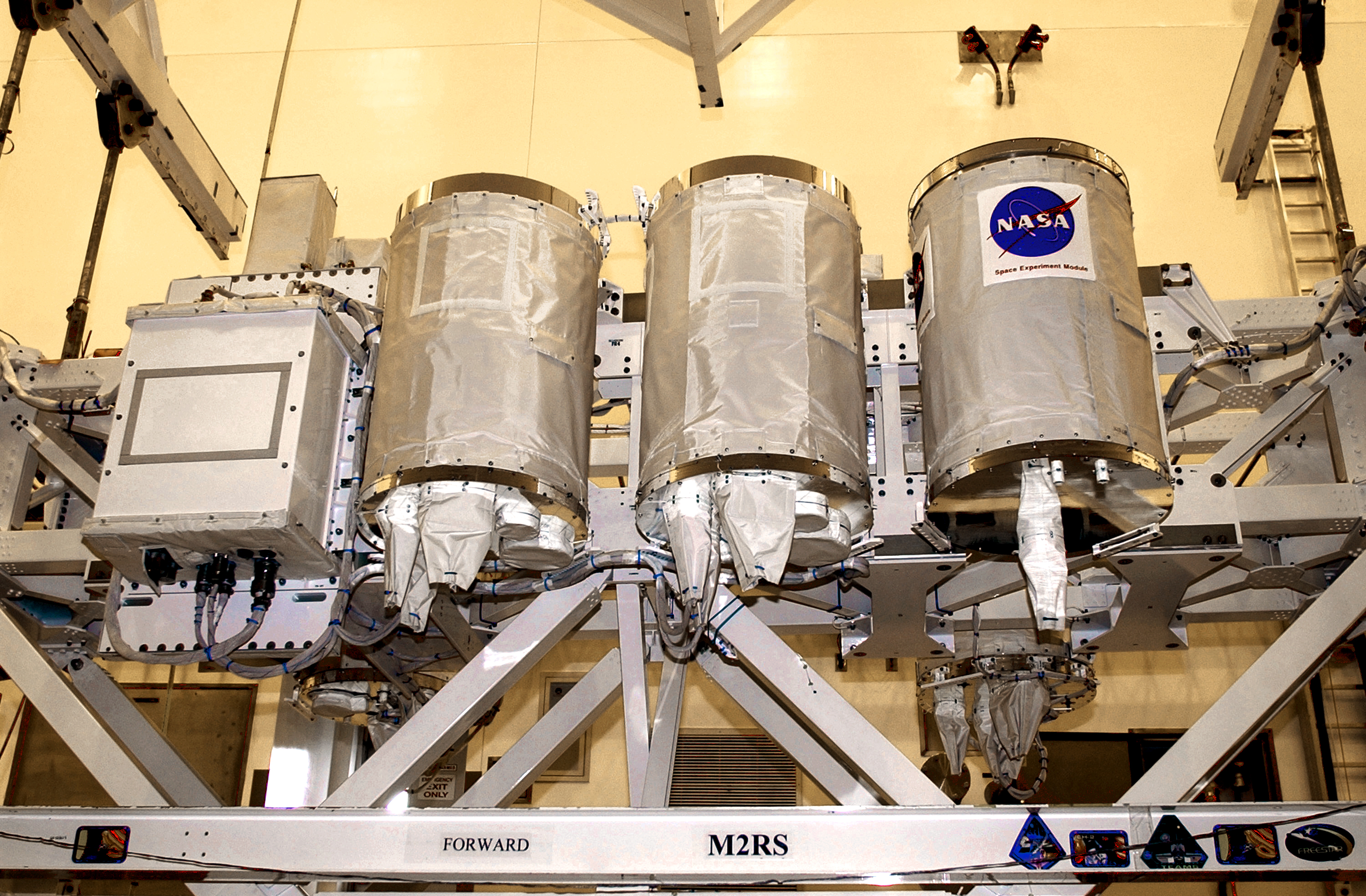
The Hitchhiker Bridge Carrier System with GAS canisters being prepared for STS-107.

The Hitchhiker carrier system was modular and expandable in accordance with payload requirements. This flexibility allowed maximum efficiency in utilizing orbiter resources and increased the potential for early manifesting on the shuttle.

There were two types of carrier systems—the Hitchhiker Side-Mount Carrier System and the Hitchhiker Cross-Bay Bridge Carrier System. Either system could accept the Hitchhiker canister and the mounting plates.

The Hitchhiker Side-Mount Carrier System used a GAS Adapter Beam for all equipment. The beam attached to the orbiter frame. The side-mount carrier was usually installed in the forward starboard side of the payload bay, although other configurations and locations were possible. This carrier could hold up to three experiments and the Hitchhiker avionics box, which connected the power, data and signal from the shuttle to the experiments.

The Hitchhiker Cross-Bay Carrier could be located anywhere in the payload bay. The carrier could accommodate 11 Hitchhiker canisters or 11 of the smaller mounting plates. There was also room for the necessary avionic units.

Four additional mounting slots were located on the top of the carrier and could accept 33 inch (83.8 centimeter) by 27 inch (68.6 centimeter) pallets or 33 inch (83.8 centimeter) by 55 inch (139.7 centimeter) pallets in any combination with up to 500 pounds (226.8 kilograms) of equipment. Any customer experiments and hardware that could be mounted on the side-mount carrier could also be flown on the cross-bay carrier.

== Astronaut involvement ==
NASA created Hitchhikers to provide customers with a way to send small payloads into orbit on the Space Shuttle. This was done with a short turn-around-time—from manifest to flight took an average of 18 months. To keep the project on schedule, experiments needed to fit in canisters or on mounting plates and meet standard mechanical and electrical interfaces.

Because the payload met these conditions, it also was entitled to special "handling" in the orbiter that other small payloads, like the Get Away Specials did not receive. This special handling included tapping into the Shuttle for power and "astronaut" services," such as requiring specific shuttle attitudes or maneuvers. The orbiter crew moved the Shuttle when necessary to the position needed for the Hitchhiker experiment, provided it did not interfere with the needs of the primary payloads.

Hitchhikers were manifested to fly with primary payloads that either have similar requirements or that will not be affected by the changes in shuttle position necessary to the Hitchhiker experiments. In addition to making adjustments to the orbiter, the astronaut crew participated in the Hitchhiker experiments by controlling the flow of orbiter power on or off using two switches located on the Standard Switch Panel.

The first switch controlled power to the avionics unit. The second switch allowed power to flow from the avionics unit to the experiment. This simple measure allowed the astronauts to have some control over the experiment, in the event of a problem. For some payloads, the crew had a keyboard/display unit, for additional control.

== Avionics ==
Getting the power from the shuttle to the payload required an avionics unit. This unit connected the power from the shuttle to the experiment. The avionics unit also carried the equipment for transmitting the data real-time to the ground control center. The avionics unit also contained the relay switching equipment and had the connections for the customer to use the shuttle television system, and the crew control/display system. Each avionics unit could handle the requirements for six experiments.

== The Goddard Connection ==
Goddard was responsible for the management and operation of the Hitchhiker project through the Shuttle Small Payloads Project. In this capacity Goddard provided the Hitchhiker carriers and the avionics unit.

During the mission, customers used a control center located at Goddard. The customer provided Ground System Equipment (CGSE), software and personnel to generate commands to the payload and display data from the payload during flight, as well as during payload-to-carrier integration and verification testing.

The Hitchhiker carrier system was equipped with a "transparent" data system which allowed customers to easily use their existing ground equipment and software to control their experiments during flight. Data was sent down to the control center in real time, but it also was recorded at Goddard once it reached the ground. The data was transmitted over Goddard's Tracking and Data Relay Satellite System.

== See also ==
- NASA
- Getaway Special
- Space Shuttle program
