= Millie Hughes-Fulford =

American astronaut and academic researcher (1945–2021)

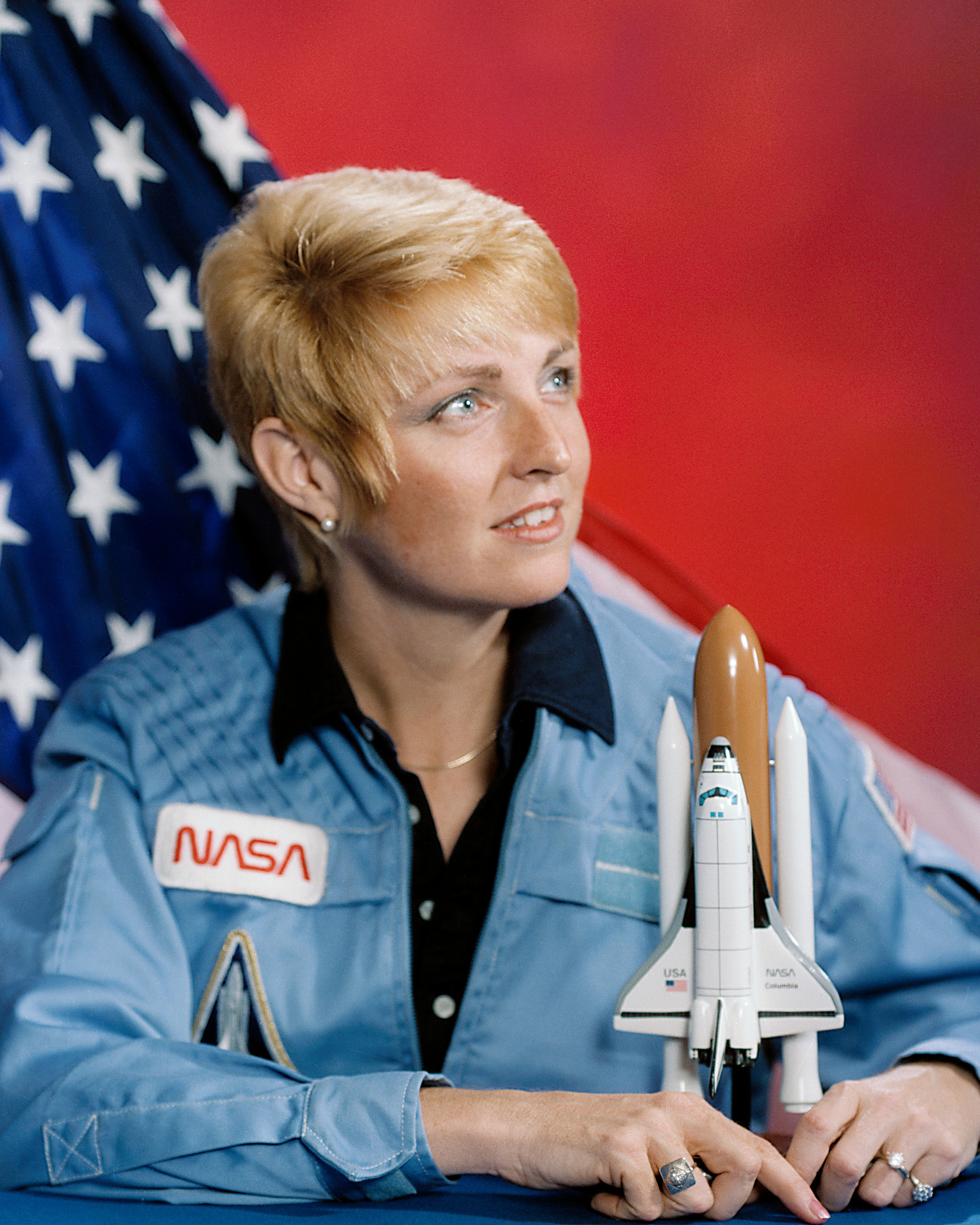
- Born: Millie Elizabeth Hughes; December 21, 1945; Mineral Wells, Texas, U.S.
- Died: February 2, 2021 (aged 75); Mill Valley, California, U.S.
- Education: Tarleton State University (B.S.), 1968; Texas Woman's University (Ph.D.), 1972
- Occupation: Chemist
- Space career

VA payload specialist
- Time in space: 9 days, 2 hours and 14 minutes
- Selection: January 1983
- Missions: STS-40

Millie Elizabeth Hughes-Fulford (née Hughes; December 21, 1945 – February 2, 2021) was an American medical investigator, molecular biologist, and payload specialist who flew aboard the NASA Space Shuttle Columbia in June 1991.

== Early life ==
Millie Elizabeth Hughes was born in Mineral Wells, Texas on December 21, 1945. She graduated from Mineral Wells High School in 1962, then entered college at the age of 16 and earned her Bachelor of Science degree in chemistry and biology from Tarleton State University in 1968. She then began her graduate work studying plasma chemistry at Texas Woman's University as a National Science Foundation Graduate Fellow from 1968 to 1971 and earned her Ph.D. in 1972. From 1971 to 1972, she was also both an American Association of University Women Fellow and a MacArthur Foundation Fellow.

== Career ==
After earning her doctorate degree in 1972, Dr. Hughes-Fulford applied to roughly 100 jobs in academia, from which she received four replies. This resulted in her joining the faculty of University of Texas Southwestern Medical Center in Dallas as a postdoctoral fellow with Marvin D. Siperstein, where her research focused on the regulation of cholesterol metabolism. Within a couple of years, she relocated with her laboratory to San Francisco.

In 1978, she noticed a printed recruiting advertisement calling for female astronauts, which led her to apply for the space program. Out of the 8000 applicants, Hughes-Fulford was in the top 20 but did not make it into NASA Astronaut Group 8. She was not deterred and continued pursuing a career in space; she was also a member of the U.S. Army Reserve Medical Corps, achieving the rank of major and serving from 1981 until 1995.

=== NASA ===
Selected into a payload specialist by NASA in January 1983, Hughes-Fulford flew in June 1991 aboard STS-40 Spacelab Life Sciences (SLS 1), the first Spacelab mission dedicated to biomedical studies. SLS-1 was also the first mission to have a crew with three female members, and Hughes-Fulford was both NASA's first female payload specialist in orbit and the first representative of the United States Department of Veterans Affairs in space. The mission flew over 3.2 million miles in 146 orbits and its crew completed over 18 experiments during a nine-day period, bringing back more medical data than any previous NASA flight. Mission duration was 218 hours, 14 minutes and 21 seconds, or 9 days, 2 hours, 14 minutes, and 20 seconds.

=== Later career ===
After her space mission for NASA, Hughes-Fulford was a professor at the University of California, San Francisco Medical Center where she continued her research until her death in 2021. She created and directed the Hughes-Fulford Laboratory at the San Francisco VA Medical Center, where her research focus included immunology, bioastronautics, and oncology.

She was the Principal Investigator (PI) on a series of SpaceHab/Biorack experiments, which examined the regulation of osteoblast (bone cell) growth. These experiments flew on STS-76, in March 1996, STS-81 in January 1997, and STS-84 in May 1997, and studied the root causes of osteoporosis that occurs in astronauts during spaceflight. One experiment resulted in observations of changes in anabolic signal transduction in microgravity. A later collaborator was Dr. Augusto Cogoli of Zürich, Switzerland; one experiment with Dr. Cogoli was lost in the Space Shuttle Columbia disaster, and another experiment using technology from Affymetrix and reverse transcription polymerase chain reaction (RT-PCR) examined changes in T-cell gene induction in spaceflight on a joint NASA/ESA International Space Station mission that launched on the Soyuz TMA-9 in 2006.

Further studies of gene regulation and signal transduction in spaceflight were approved in January 2002 for Shuttle/ISS experiments examining protein kinase C (PKC) signal activation. She flew her most recent experiments to ISS on a SpaceX rocket in collaboration with the ISS International Laboratory, the European Space Agency, and the National Institutes of Health. In those studies, she found one basis for changes in the immune system in spaceflight. Many of her publications are available at her laboratory web site.

Hughes-Fulford contributed over 120 papers and abstracts, including on bone and cancer growth regulation, and on the effect of spaceflight on the immune system at the cell molecular and systems biology level. She was a member of the American Association for the Advancement of Science, American Society for Gravitational Science and Biology, American Society for Bone and Mineral Research, American Society for Cell Biology, American Society of Hematology and the Association of Space Explorers.

== Personal life ==
Hughes-Fulford was married twice. Her first marriage was to policeman Rick Wiley, with whom she had a daughter, and ended in divorce in the late 1970s. Her second marriage was in 1983 to George Fulford, a United Airlines pilot whom she met in 1981. She died in Mill Valley, California, on February 2, 2021, of lymphoma, which was the subject of her last research paper.

== Awards and honors ==
- 2004–2013 Universities Space Research Association, Board of Trustees
- 1995–2001 Advisory Board for Marine Biological Laboratory, Sciences Writing Program, Woods Hole, Massachusetts
- 1995 International Zontian
- 1995 Marin County Woman of the Year
- 1991 NASA Space Flight Medal
- 1987–1990 National Research Council, Committee on Space Biology and Space Medicine
- 1986–1989 Board of Regents Embry–Riddle Aeronautical University, Daytona Beach, Florida
- 1984 Presidential Award for Federal Employee for Western Region
- 1971–1972 MacArthur Foundation Fellow
- 1971–1972 American Association of University Women's Fellowship
- 1968–1971 National Science Foundation Fellow (Graduate)
- 1965 National Science Foundation Summer Research Fellow (Undergraduate)
