= Adirondack (Mars) =

Boulder on Mars

Adirondack Rock
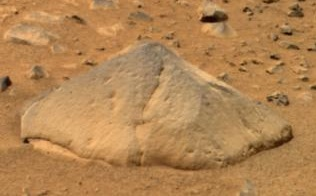
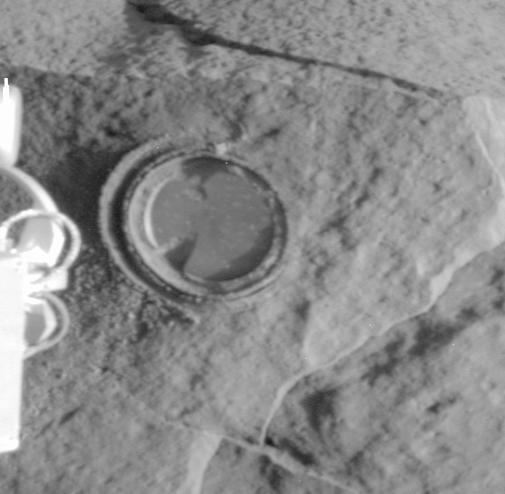
- (Above) An approximate true-color view of "Adirondack" rock, taken by Spirit's pancam. (Right) Digital camera image (from Spirit's Pancam) of "Adirondack" rock after a RAT grind (Spirit's rock-grinding tool)
- Feature type: Rock
- Coordinates: 14.6°S 175.5°E

Adirondack is the nickname for Mars Exploration Rover Spirit's first target rock. Scientists chose Adirondack to be Spirit's first target rock after considering another, called Sashimi, that would have been a shorter, straight-ahead drive. Spirit traversed the sandy Martian terrain at Gusev Crater to arrive in front of this football-sized rock on January 18, 2004, just three days after it successfully rolled off the lander.

Scientists named the angular rock after the Adirondack mountain range in New York.

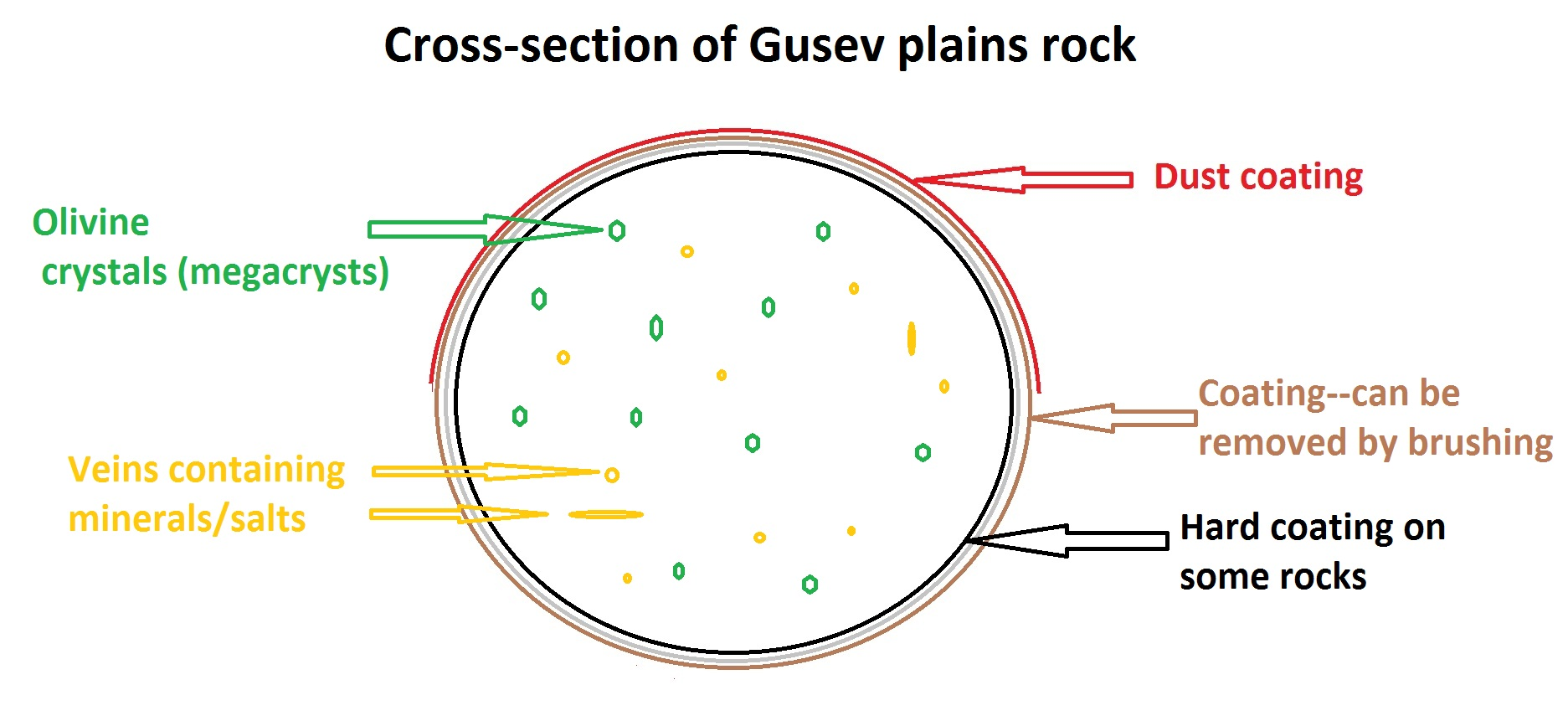
Cross-section of a typical rock from the plains of Gusev crater - most rocks contain a coating of dust - water-deposited veins are visible.

The rock was selected as Spirit's first target because its dust-free, flat surface was ideally suited for grinding. Clean surfaces also are better for examining a rock's top coating. Spirit also returned microscopic images and Mössbauer spectrometer readings of Adirondack taken the day before the rover developed computer and communication problems on January 22, 2004. Both are unprecedented investigations of any rock on another planet. The microscopic images indicate Adirondack is a hard, crystalline rock. The peaks large and small in Adirondack's electromagnetic spectrum reveal that the minerals in the rock include olivine, pyroxene and magnetite - a common composition in volcanic basalt rocks on Earth.

Adirondack turned out to be typical of the other rocks on the plains. Spirit rover's instruments determined that Adironack and other rocks of the plains contain the minerals pyroxene, olivine, plagioclase, and magnetite. These rocks can be classified in different ways. The amounts and types of minerals make the rocks primitive basalts—also called picritic basalts. The rocks are similar to ancient terrestrial rocks called basaltic komatiites. Rocks of the plains also resemble the basaltic shergottites, meteorites which came from Mars. One classification system compares the amount of alkali elements to the amount of silica on a graph; in this system, Gusev plains rocks lie near the junction of basalt, picrobasalt, and tephrite. The Irvine-Barager classification calls them basalts. Adirondack has been very slightly altered, probably by thin films of water because they are softer and contain veins of light-colored material that may be bromine compounds, as well as coatings or rinds. Small amounts of water may have gotten into cracks inducing mineralization processes. Coatings on the rocks in the plains may have occurred when rocks were buried and interacted with thin films of water and dust. One sign that they were altered was that it was easier to grind these rocks compared to the same types of rocks found on Earth.

== See also ==
- Aeolis quadrangle
- Composition of Mars
- List of rocks on Mars
- Scientific information from the Mars Exploration Rover mission
