= Rock Abrasion Tool =

NASA Mars Exploration Rover component

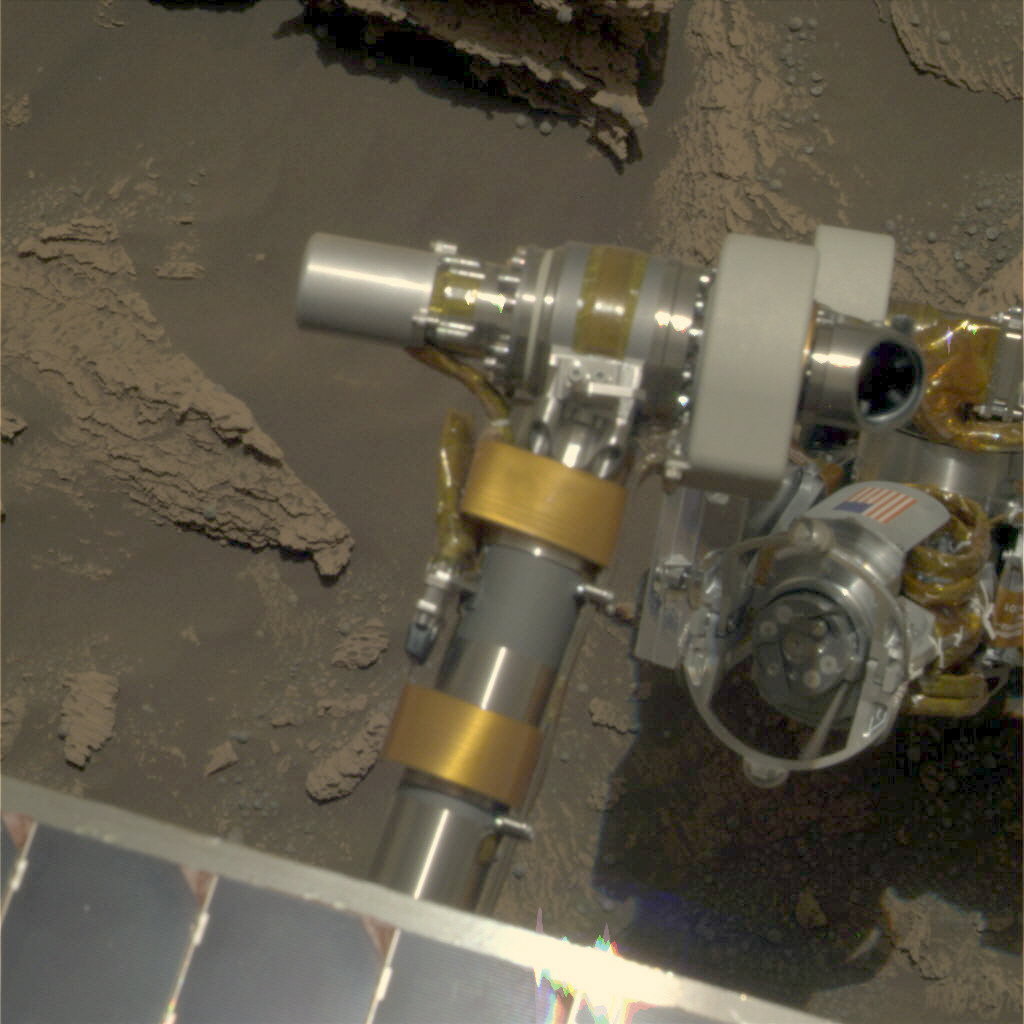
- Rock Abrasion Tool (RAT) on the Mars Rover Opportunity's Instrument Deployment Device.
- Operator: Honeybee Robotics
- Manufacturer: Honeybee Robotics
- Instrument type: Installation
- Function: Grinding and brushing
- Began operations: February 6, 2004
- Website: Description from manufacturer's site

Properties
- Mass: 0.685 kilograms
- Dimensions: 7 cm in diameter and 10 cm long
- Power consumption: 30 watts

Host spacecraft
- Spacecraft: Mars Exploration Rovers

The Rock Abrasion Tool (RAT) is a grinding and brushing installation on NASA’s twin Mars Exploration Rovers, Spirit (MER-A) and Opportunity (MER-B), which landed on Mars in January 2004. It was designed, developed and continues to be operated by Honeybee Robotics LTD, a developer of specialized robots, automated technologies and related systems.

The RAT was the first machine to gain access to the interior of rocks on another planet. The RAT has a mass of 0.685 kilograms (1.51 pounds), is 7 cm (3 in) in diameter and 10 cm (3.9 in) long, about the size of a soda can. It uses a diamond dust and resin wheel spinning at 3000 rpm to drill a 45 mm diameter by 5 mm deep bore hole in martian rocks. The RAT then uses two brushes to sweep dust from the bore holes for closer scientific inspection. Its average power consumption is 30 watts.

There are five other instruments aboard both rovers, these are the Pancam (a camera), Mini-TES (an infrared spectrometer) for sensing targets at a distance, a microscopic imager, a Mössbauer spectrometer and an alpha particle X-ray spectrometer. The RAT provides these instruments with a smooth, clean surface from which they make more accurate observations.

The RAT was first used by Spirit on its 34th sol (February 6, 2004). It was held up to the rock Adirondack, whereby it scraped to a depth of 2.85 mm (0.112 in) over the course of three hours. Since then it has been used on numerous Martian rocks by both MER rovers.

The RAT was originally controlled from NASA's Jet Propulsion Laboratory in Pasadena, California, but is now run by Honeybee Robotics LTD from their New York headquarters. The RAT is the first product of Honeybee Robotics LTD's to be sent into space by NASA.

The cable shield of each RAT is made from aluminum recovered from the World Trade Center site after the September 11 attacks.

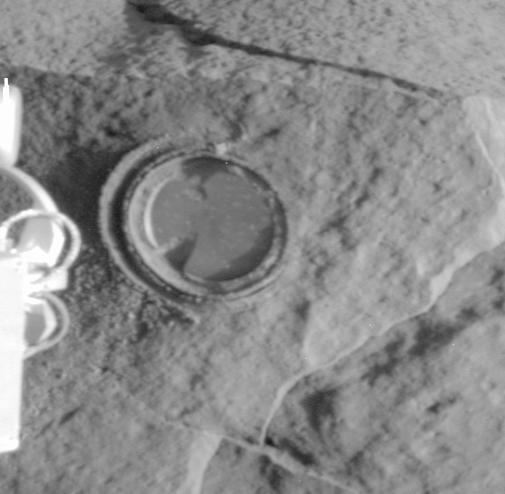
The RAT has been used to grind a hole in the rock Adirondack. The hole is approximately 2.65 millimeters deep.
