= Henry Hartsfield =

American astronaut (1933–2014)

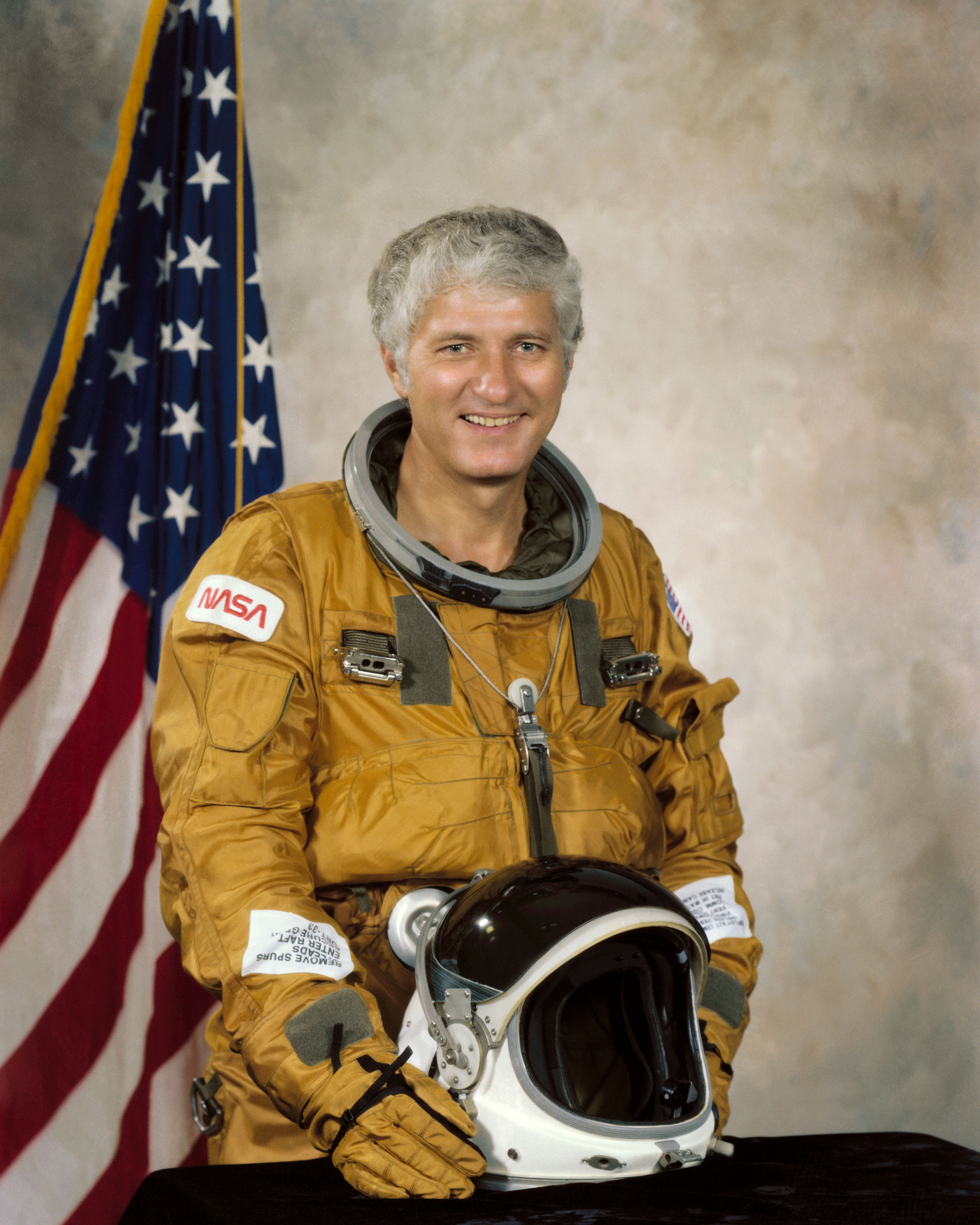
- Hartsfield in 1979
- Born: Henry Warren Hartsfield Jr. November 21, 1933; Birmingham, Alabama, U.S.
- Died: July 17, 2014 (aged 80); Houston, Texas, U.S.
- Education: Auburn University (BS); Duke University; Air University; University of Tennessee, Knoxville (MS)
- Awards: NASA Distinguished Service Medal
- Space career

NASA astronaut
- Rank: Colonel, USAF
- Time in space: 20d 2h 50m
- Selection: USAF MOL Group (1966); NASA Group 7 (1969)
- Mission: STS-4; STS-41-D; STS-61-A
- Mission insignia
- Retired: March 1998

Henry Warren Hartsfield Jr. (November 21, 1933 – July 17, 2014) was a colonel in the United States Air Force and a NASA astronaut who logged over 480 hours in space. He was inducted into the United States Astronaut Hall of Fame in 2006.

== Personal data ==
Henry Hartsfield was born in Birmingham, Alabama, on November 21, 1933. He was married to the former Judy Frances Massey of Princeton, North Carolina, and had two daughters.

== Education ==
Hartsfield graduated from West End High School in Birmingham, Alabama. He later earned a Bachelor of Science degree in physics from Auburn University in 1954, where he was a member of the Delta Chi fraternity. Hartsfield performed graduate work in physics at Duke University and in astronautics at the U.S. Air Force Institute of Technology at Wright-Patterson Air Force Base. He was also awarded a Master of Science degree in Engineering Science from the University of Tennessee in 1971.

== USAF experience ==
Hartsfield received his commission through the Reserve Officer Training Corps (ROTC) at Auburn University. He entered the U.S. Air Force in 1955, and his assignments included a tour with the 53rd Tactical Fighter Squadron in Bitburg, West Germany. He is also a graduate of the U.S. Air Force Test Pilot School at Edwards Air Force Base, California, and was an instructor there prior to his assignment in 1966 to the USAF Manned Orbiting Laboratory (MOL) program as an astronaut. After the cancellation of the MOL program in June 1969, he was reassigned to NASA.

He logged over 7,400 hours of flying time—of which over 6,150 hours are in the North American F-86 Sabre, North American F-100 Super Sabre, Lockheed F-104 Starfighter, Republic F-105 Thunderchief, Convair F-106 Delta Dart, Lockheed T-33, and Northrop T-38 Talon jet aircraft.

== NASA experience ==
Hartsfield became part of NASA Astronaut Group 7 in September 1969. He was a member of the astronaut support crew for Apollo 16 and served as a member of the astronaut support crew for the Skylab-2, -3, and -4 missions. He also was a CAPCOM on STS-1.

Hartsfield retired in August 1977 from the United States Air Force with more than 22 years of active service but continued his assignment as a NASA astronaut in a civilian capacity. He was a member of the orbital flight test missions group of the Astronaut Office and was responsible for supporting the development of the Space Shuttle's entry flight control system and its associated interfaces.

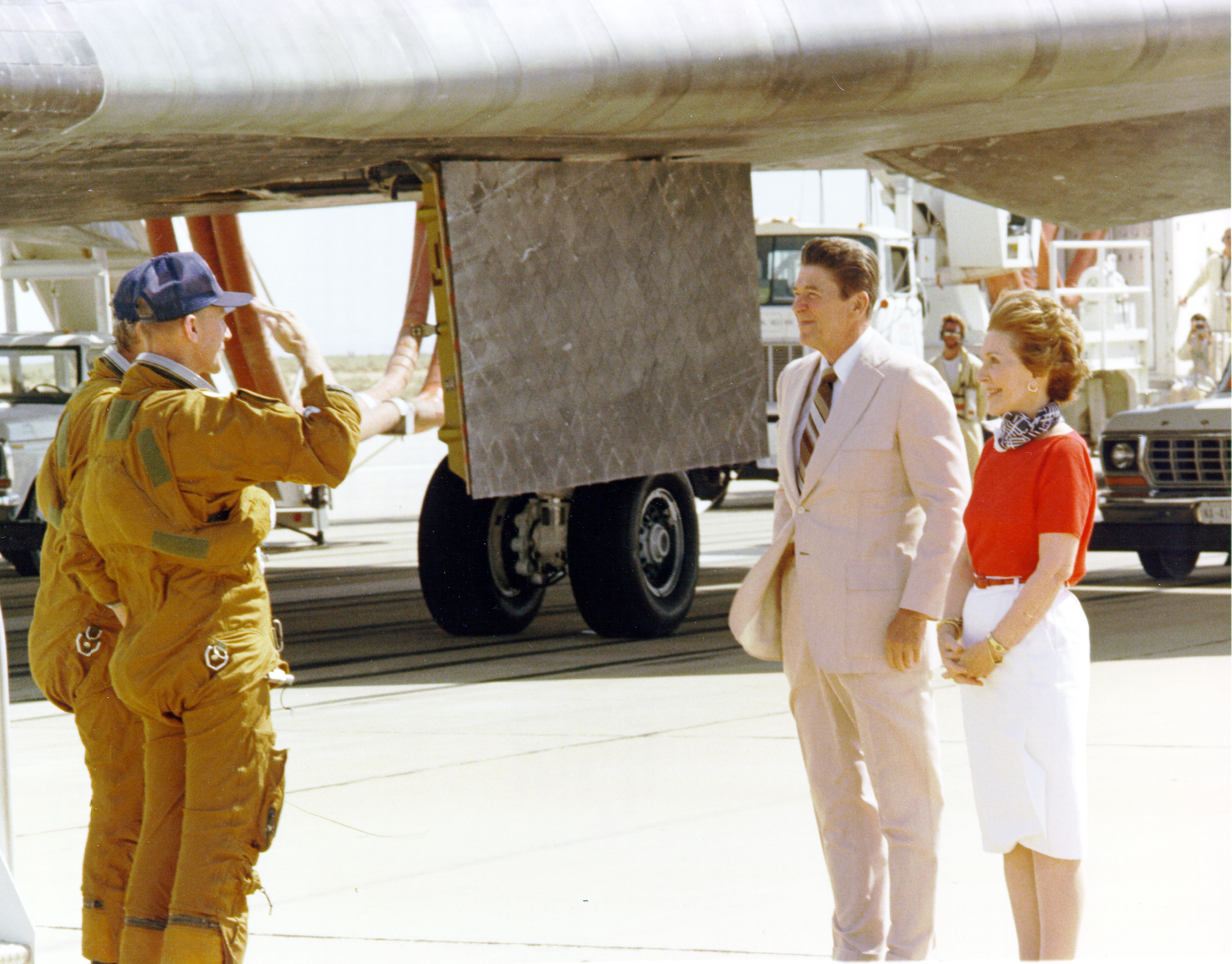
Columbia astronauts Thomas K. Mattingly and Pilot Henry W. Hartsfield salute President Ronald Reagan, standing beside his wife, Nancy, upon landing in 1982.

Hartsfield served as backup pilot for STS-2 and STS-3, Columbia's second and third orbital flight tests.

Hartsfield was the pilot on STS-4, the fourth and final orbital test flight of the shuttle Columbia, which launched from Kennedy Space Center, Florida, on June 27, 1982. He was accompanied by Thomas K. Mattingly II (spacecraft commander) on this seven-day mission designed to: further verify ascent and entry phases of shuttle missions; perform continued studies of the effects of long-term thermal extremes on the Orbiter subsystems; and conduct a survey of Orbiter-induced contamination on the orbiter payload bay. Additionally, the crew operated several scientific experiments located in the Orbiter's cabin as well as in the payload bay. These experiments included the Continuous Flow Electrophoresis System (CFES), designed to investigate the separation of biological materials in a fluid according to their surface electrical charge. The crew is also credited with effecting an in-flight repair which enabled them to activate the first operational "Getaway Special" — comprising nine experiments that range from algae and duckweed growth in space to fruit fly and brine shrimp genetic studies. STS-4 completed 112 orbits of the Earth before landing on a concrete runway at Edwards Air Force Base, California, on July 4, 1982.

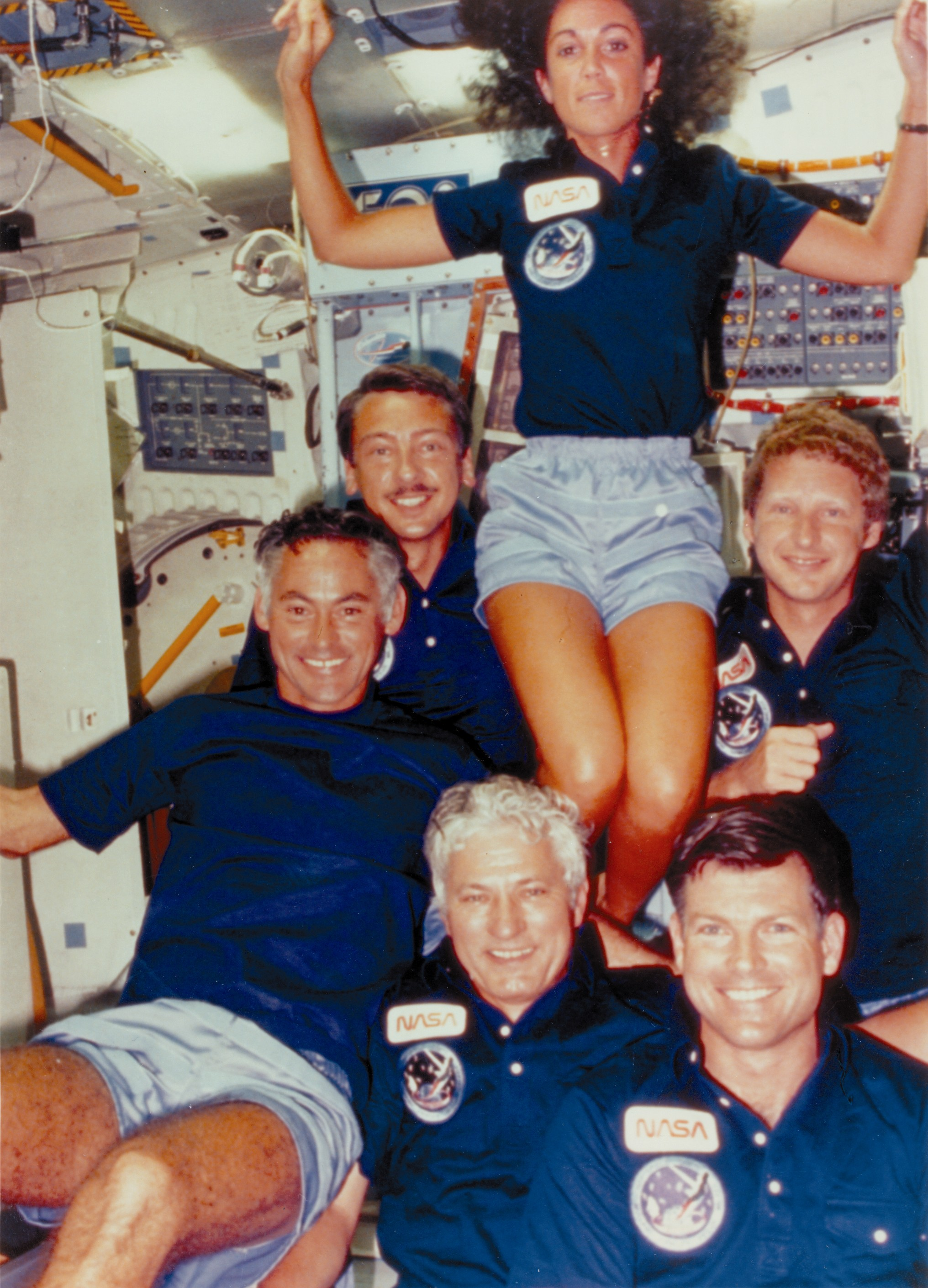
The crew of STS-41-D in orbit aboard Discovery. Hartsfield is at the lower center.

Hartsfield was next spacecraft commander of STS-41-D which launched from Kennedy Space Center, Florida, on August 30, 1984. The crew included Michael L. Coats (pilot), Judith A. Resnik, Steven A. Hawley and Richard M. Mullane (mission specialists), and Charles D. Walker (payload specialist). This was the maiden flight of the orbiter Space Shuttle Discovery. During the six-day mission the crew successfully activated the OAST-1 solar cell wing experiment, deployed three satellites, SBS-D, SYNCOM IV-2 (LEASAT-2), and TELSTAR 3-C, operated the CFES-III experiment, the student crystal growth experiment, and photography experiments using the IMAX motion picture camera. The crew earned the name "Icebusters" when Hartsfield successfully removed a hazardous ice buildup from the orbiter using the Remote Manipulator System (Canadarm). STS-41-D completed 96 orbits of the Earth before landing at Edwards Air Force Base, California, on September 5, 1984.

On his third flight, Hartsfield was spacecraft commander of Challenger on STS-61-A, the West German Spacelab D-1 mission which launched from Kennedy Space Center, Florida, on October 30, 1985. His crew included Steven R. Nagel (pilot), James F. Buchli, Guion S. Bluford Jr. and Bonnie J. Dunbar (mission specialists), and Reinhard Furrer, Ernst Messerschmid, and Wubbo Ockels (payload specialists). The seven-day mission was the first with eight crew members, and the first Spacelab science mission planned and controlled by a foreign customer. More than 75 scientific experiments were completed in the areas of physiological sciences, materials processing, biology, and navigation. After completing 111 orbits of the Earth, STS-61-A landed at Edwards Air Force Base, California, on November 6, 1985. STS-61-A was the final successful flight of Challenger, as it was destroyed during the launch of its next mission, STS-51-L.

With the completion of this flight, Hartsfield had logged 483 hours in space.

Between 1986 and 1987, Hartsfield served as the Deputy Chief of the Astronaut Office. In 1987, he became the Deputy Director for Flight Crew Operations, supervising the activities of the Astronaut Office and the Aircraft Operations Division at the Johnson Space Center (JSC).

In 1989, he accepted a temporary assignment in the Office of Space Flight at NASA Headquarters in Washington, D.C. There he served as Director of the Technical Integration and Analysis Division, reporting directly to the Associate Administrator for Space Flight. In this assignment, he was responsible for facilitating the integration of the Space Station Freedom and its unique requirements into the Space Shuttle systems. His office also served as a technical forum for resolving technical programmatic issues.

In 1990, Hartsfield accepted another temporary assignment as the Deputy Manager for Operations, Space Station Projects Office, at the Marshall Space Flight Center in Huntsville, Alabama. In that capacity, he was responsible for the planning and management of Space Station Operations and Utilization Capability Development and operations activities including budget preparation. Later in that assignment, he also acted as the Deputy Manager for the Space Station Projects Office.

In 1991, Hartsfield accepted the position of the Man-Tended Capability (MTC) Phase Manager, Space Station Freedom Program and Operations (SSFPO), with a duty station at the Johnson Space Center. Reporting directly to the Deputy Director, SSFPO, he represented the Deputy Director in providing appropriate program guidance and direction to the Space Shuttle Program, and across the Space Station Freedom Program for all MTC phase mission unique activities to assure appropriate resolution of issues.

In December 1993, Hartsfield accepted the position of Manager, International Space Station (ISS) Independent Assessment. In this capacity, he reported directly to the Associate Administrator for Safety and Mission Assurance and managed and focused the oversight activities and assessment of the International Space Station Program.

In September 1996, the scope of Hartsfield's work was expanded to include independent assessment of the programs and projects of the Human Exploration and Development of Space (HEDS) Enterprise and he was named Director, HEDS Independent Assurance.

Hartsfield retired from NASA in 1998 and then joined the executive ranks of Raytheon Company as vice president of aerospace engineering services. He retired from Raytheon in 2005. He died on July 17, 2014, from complications from back surgery.

== Special honors ==
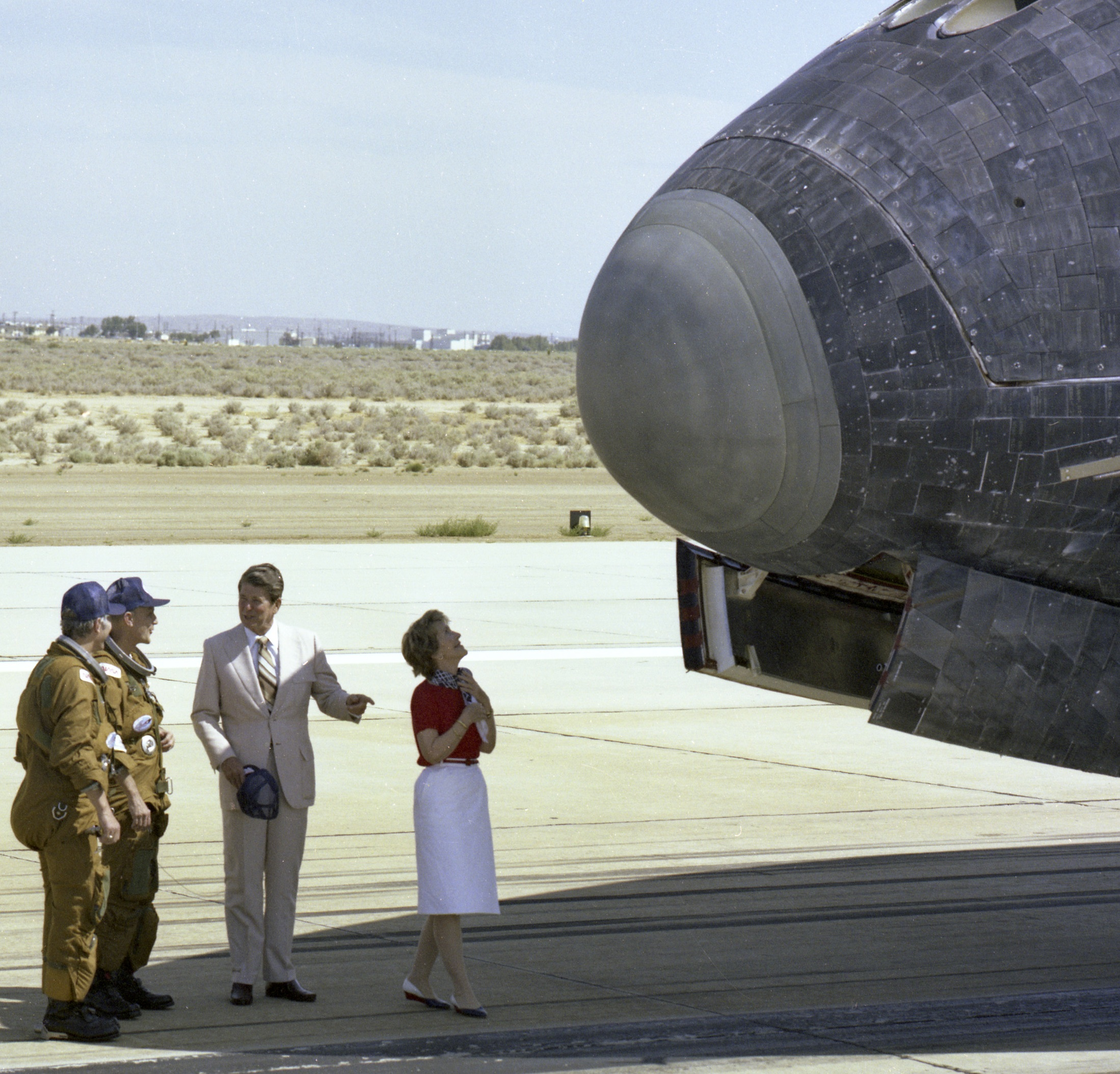
President Ronald Reagan talks with astronauts Henry Hartsfield and Thomas Mattingly as first lady Nancy Reagan looks at Space Shuttle Columbia following its 1982 Independence Day landing at Edwards Air Force Base.

- Air Force Meritorious Service Medal
- General Thomas D. White Space Trophy for 1973
- Alabama Aviation Hall of Fame (1983)
- Distinguished Civilian Service Award (DOD) (1982)
- NASA Distinguished Service Medals (1982, 1988)
- NASA Space Flight Medals (1982, 1984, 1985)
- NASA Exceptional Service Medal (1988)
- Honorary Doctor of Science degree from Auburn University (1986)
- Inducted into the U.S. Astronaut Hall of Fame (2006)
