= STS-2 =

1981 American crewed spaceflight

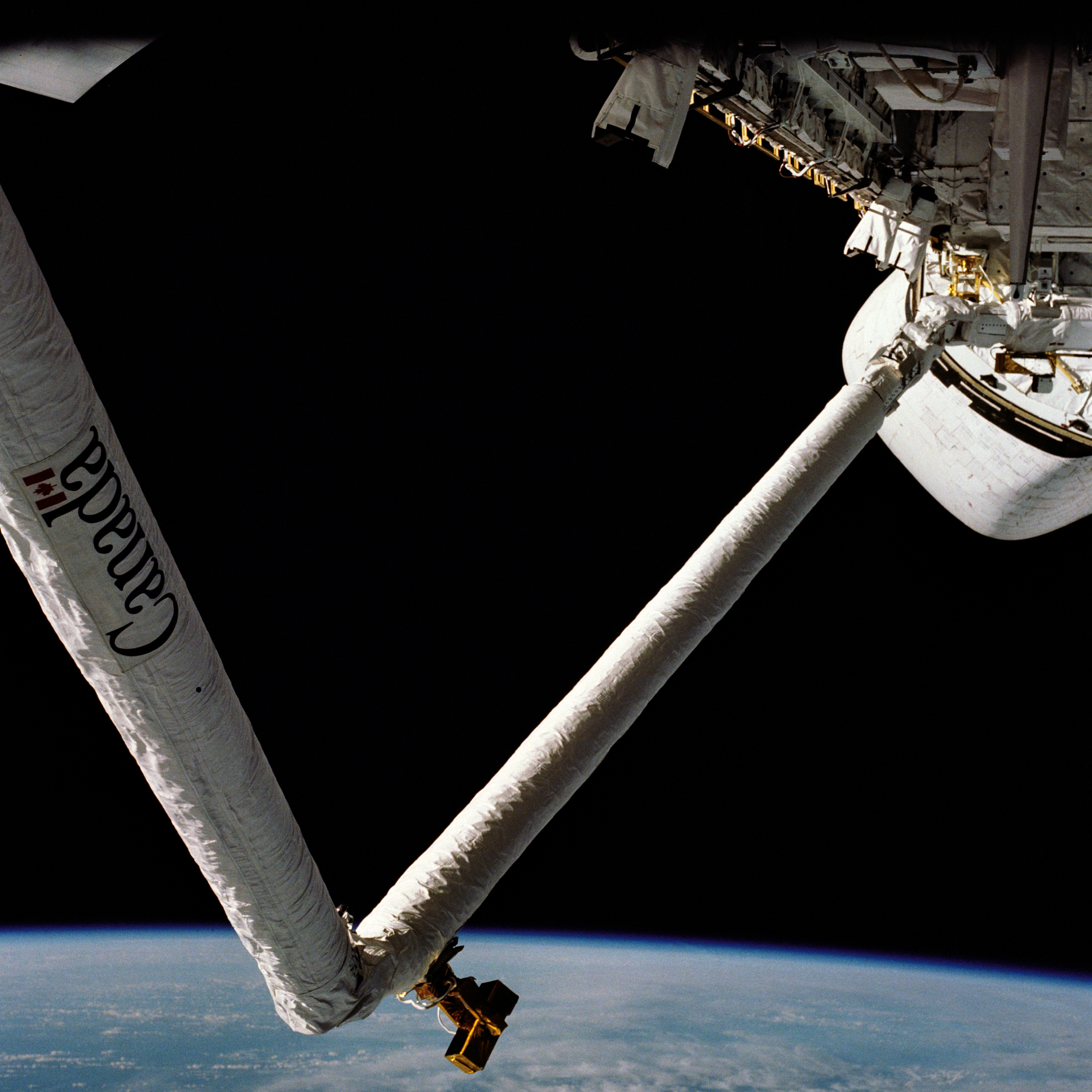
- Canadarm's in-flight test during STS-2
- Names: Space Transportation System-2
- Mission type: Flight test
- Operator: NASA
- COSPAR ID: 1981-111A
- SATCAT no.: 12953
- Mission duration: Achieved: 2 days, 6 hours, 13 minutes, 12 seconds Planned: 5 days
- Distance travelled: 1,730,000 km (1,070,000 mi)
- Orbits completed: 37

Spacecraft properties
- Spacecraft: Space Shuttle Columbia
- Launch mass: 104,647 kg (230,707 lb)
- Landing mass: 92,650 kg (204,260 lb)
- Payload mass: 8,517 kg (18,777 lb)

Crew
- Crew size: 2
- Members: Joe Engle; Richard H. Truly

Start of mission
- Launch date: November 12, 1981, 15:10:00 UTC (10:10 am EST)
- Launch site: Kennedy, LC-39A
- Contractor: Rockwell International

End of mission
- Landing date: November 14, 1981, 21:23:12 UTC (1:23:12 pm PST)
- Landing site: Edwards, Runway 23

Orbital parameters
- Reference system: Geocentric orbit
- Regime: Low Earth orbit
- Perigee altitude: 222 km (138 mi)
- Apogee altitude: 231 km (144 mi)
- Inclination: 38.03°
- Period: 89.00 minutes

Instruments
- Development Flight Instrumentation (DFI); Shuttle Imaging Radar (SIR)
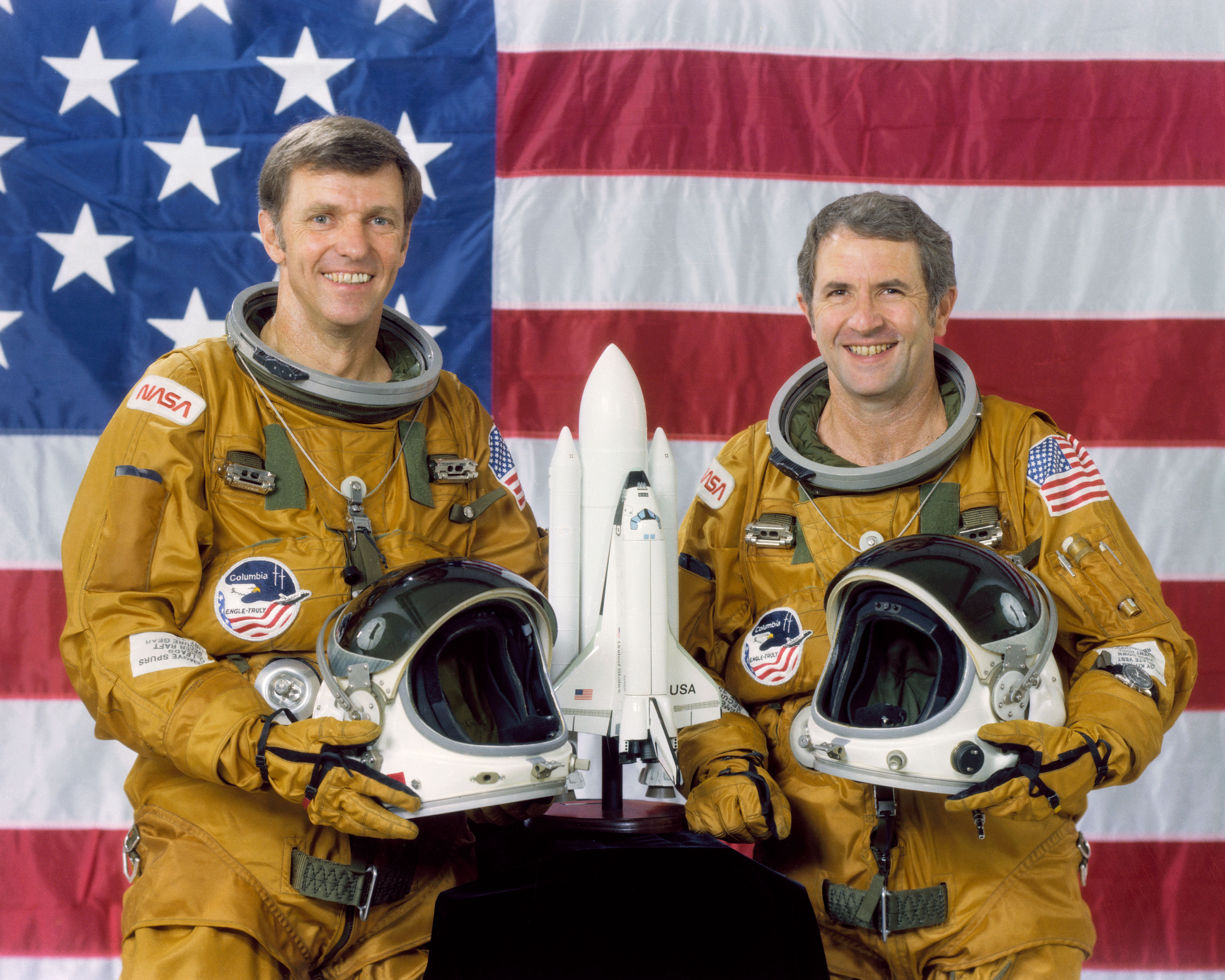
- STS-2 mission patch Engle and Truly Space Shuttle program

STS-2 was the second Space Shuttle mission conducted by NASA, and the second flight of the orbiter Columbia. The mission, crewed by Joe H. Engle and Richard H. Truly, launched on November 12, 1981, and landed two days later on November 14, 1981. STS-2 marked the first time that a crewed, reusable orbital vehicle returned to space. (Note: The uncrewed Gemini 2 suborbital capsule was reused in another uncrewed, suborbital test for the Manned Orbiting Laboratory (MOL) project after significant refurbishment. Also, two X-15 airframes (flown by STS-2 Commander Joe Engle) were reused on several suborbital space missions.) This mission tested the Shuttle Imaging Radar (SIR) as part of the OSTA-1 (Office of Space and Terrestrial Applications) payload, along with a wide range of other experiments including the Shuttle Remote Manipulator System, commonly known as Canadarm.

Other experiments or tests included Shuttle Multispectral Infrared Radiometer, Feature Identification and Location Experiment, Measurement of Air Pollution from Satellites, Ocean Color Experiment, Night/Day optical Survey of Lightning, Heflex Bioengineering Test, and Aerodynamic Coefficient Identification Package (ACIP). One of the feats accomplished was various tests on the Orbital Maneuvering System (OMS) including starting and restarting the engines while in orbit and various adjustments to its orbit. The OMS tests also helped adjust the Shuttle's orbit for use of the radar. During the mission, President Reagan called the crew of STS-2 from Mission Control Center in Houston.

In the early planning stages of the Space Shuttle program, STS-2 was intended to be a reboost mission for the aging Skylab space station. (Note: Fred Haise and Jack Lousma were named as the prime crew for the original STS-2 mission, with Vance D. Brand and C. Gordon Fullerton as backups) However, such a mission was impeded by delays with the Shuttle's development and the deteriorating orbit of Skylab. Skylab ultimately de-orbited on July 11, 1979, two years before the launch of STS-2.

== Crew ==
Position	Astronaut
Commander	Joe H. Engle; First NASA spaceflight
Pilot	Richard H. Truly; First spaceflight

Engle had been the original selection as Lunar Module Pilot for Apollo 17, but was bumped in favor of geologist Harrison Schmitt when it became clear that the mission would be the last lunar landing. As a consequence, both Engle and Truly were rookies during STS-2 (Engle had flown the X-15 above 80 km (50 mi) and so had earned USAF astronaut wings, but was still considered a NASA rookie), constituting the first all-rookie crew since Skylab 4, and the first and only all-rookie crew on the space shuttle. Engle was the last NASA rookie to command his first flight until Raja Chari in 2021 with SpaceX Crew-3. Engle and Truly had also served as one of the two Shuttle crews during the Approach and Landing Tests (ALT) program in 1977.

Following STS-2, NASA required all shuttle commanders to have previous spaceflight experience.

=== Backup crew ===
Position	Astronaut
Commander	Ken Mattingly
Pilot	Henry Hartsfield
This crew would later fly on STS-4.

=== Support crew ===
- Daniel C. Brandenstein (ascent CAPCOM)
- James F. Buchli
- Terry J. Hart
- Frederick H. Hauck (entry CAPCOM)
- Sally K. Ride (first American woman CAPCOM)

=== Crew seat assignments ===
Seat	Launch	Landing	Seats 1–4 are on the flight deck. Seats 5–7 are on the mid-deck.
1	Engle		Seats 1–4 are on the flight deck. Seats 5–7 are on the mid-deck.
2	Truly		Seats 1–4 are on the flight deck. Seats 5–7 are on the mid-deck.
3	Unused		Seats 1–4 are on the flight deck. Seats 5–7 are on the mid-deck.
4	Unused		Seats 1–4 are on the flight deck. Seats 5–7 are on the mid-deck.
5	Unused		Seats 1–4 are on the flight deck. Seats 5–7 are on the mid-deck.
6	Unused		Seats 1–4 are on the flight deck. Seats 5–7 are on the mid-deck.
7	Unused		Seats 1–4 are on the flight deck. Seats 5–7 are on the mid-deck.

== Mission summary ==
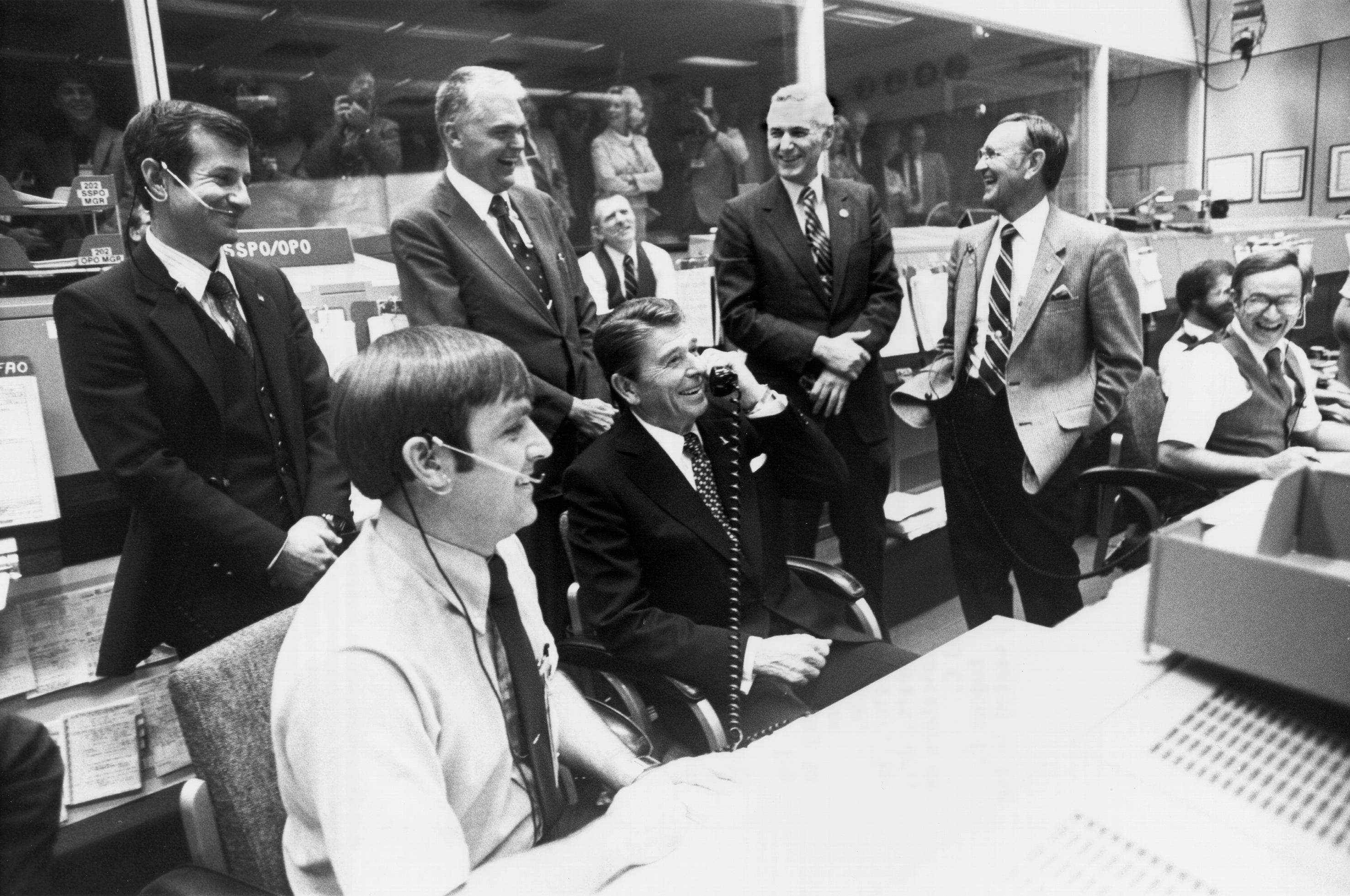
President Reagan talks to the crew of STS-2, in November 1981.

The second Space Shuttle mission launched from Kennedy Space Center on November 12, 1981, with liftoff occurring at 15:10:00 UTC, 7 months after STS-1. The planned launch time of 12:30 UTC was delayed while a faulty data transmitting unit on Columbia was replaced with one from new Space Shuttle Challenger, which had been shipped overnight from the Palmdale, California factory where Challenger was still being manufactured. Richard Truly became the first astronaut to fly into space on his birthday.

Originally, the launch had been set for October 9, 1981, but it was delayed by a nitrogen tetroxide spill during the loading of the forward Reaction Control System (RCS) tanks. The spill necessitated the removal, decontamination and reapplication of over 300 thermal tiles. The tiles could be reached from platforms at Launch Complex 39A, allowing the work to take place without destacking Columbia and returning it to the Orbiter Processing Facility (OPF). It was next scheduled for November 4, 1981, but was again scrubbed when high oil pressures were discovered in two of the three Auxiliary Power Units (APUs) that controlled the orbiter's hydraulic system. That issue was attributed to hydrazine seepage contaminating the lubrication system in the APUs.

Attempt	Planned	Result	Turnaround	Reason	Decision point	Weather go (%)	Notes
1	4 Nov 1981, 12:30:00 pm	Scrubbed	—	Technical	(T−00:00:31)		APU's 1 and 3 lube oil outlet pressure high at 100 to 112 PSIA. Flushed APU's 1 and 3 gear boxes and changed clogged filters.
2	12 Nov 1981, 10:10:00 am	Success	7 days 21 hours 40 minutes				Multiplexer/Demultiplexer (MDM) of 3 failed delaying launch by 2 hours 40 minutes while a replacement from the Challenger orbiter was flown in. An additional 10-minute delay was introduced for a confidence review of systems status.

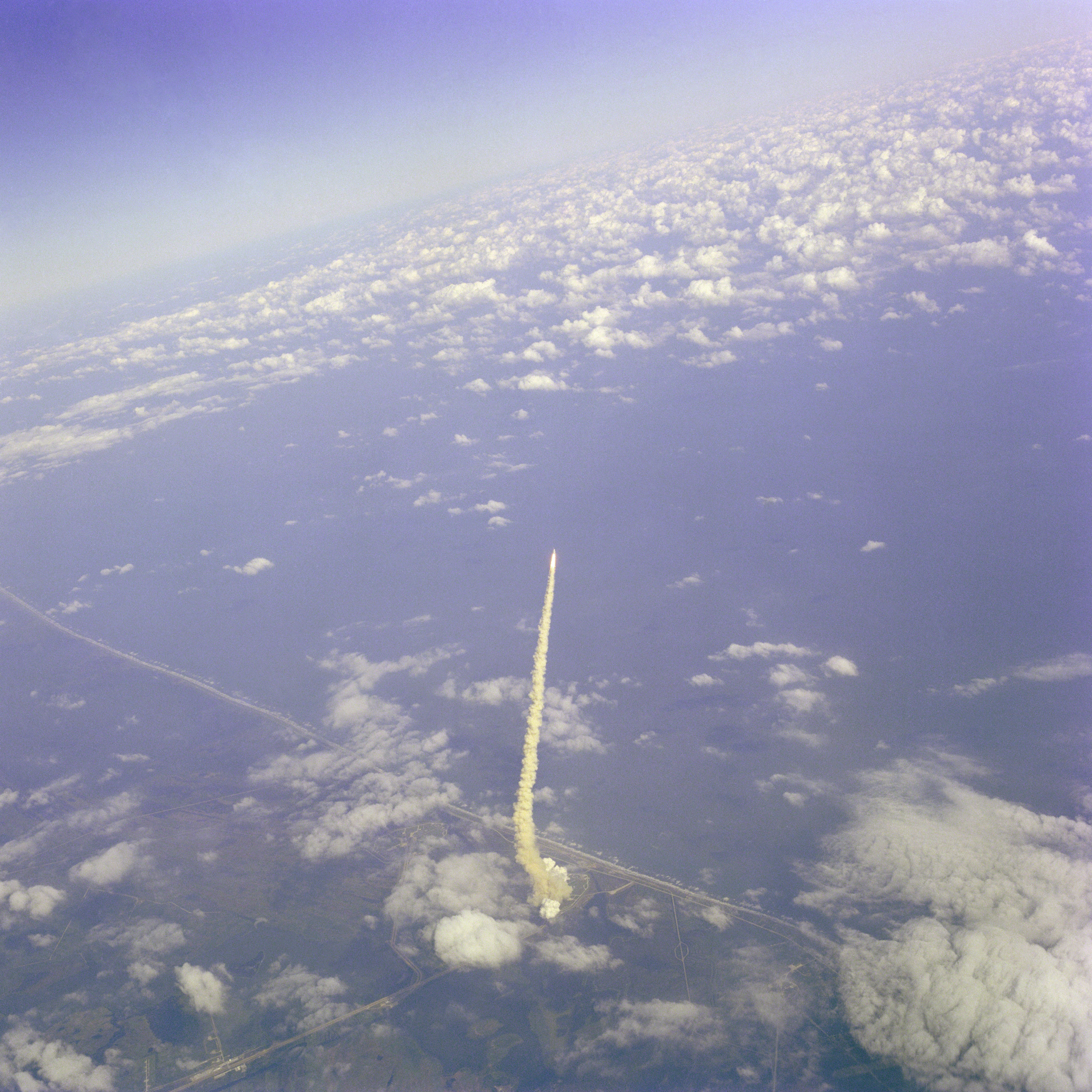
Aerial view of Columbia's launch from Pad 39A at the Kennedy Space Center in Florida.

The flight marked the first time an orbital crewed space vehicle had been re-flown with a second crew. Prior to launch, Columbia spent 103 days in the Orbiter Processing Facility. It again carried the DFI package, as well as the OSTA-l payload (named for the NASA Office of Space and Terrestrial Applications), which consisted of a number of remote-sensing instruments mounted on a Spacelab pallet in the payload bay. These instruments, including the Shuttle Imaging Radar-A (SIR-A), successfully carried out remote sensing of Earth's resources, environmental quality, and ocean and weather conditions. In addition, the Canadian-built "Canadarm" Remote Manipulator System (RMS) was successfully operated in all its various operating modes for the first time.

During the mission, the Mission Control Center was visited by President Ronald Reagan. He was supposed to visit during STS-1, but was forced to cancel due to an assassination attempt on March 30, 1981.

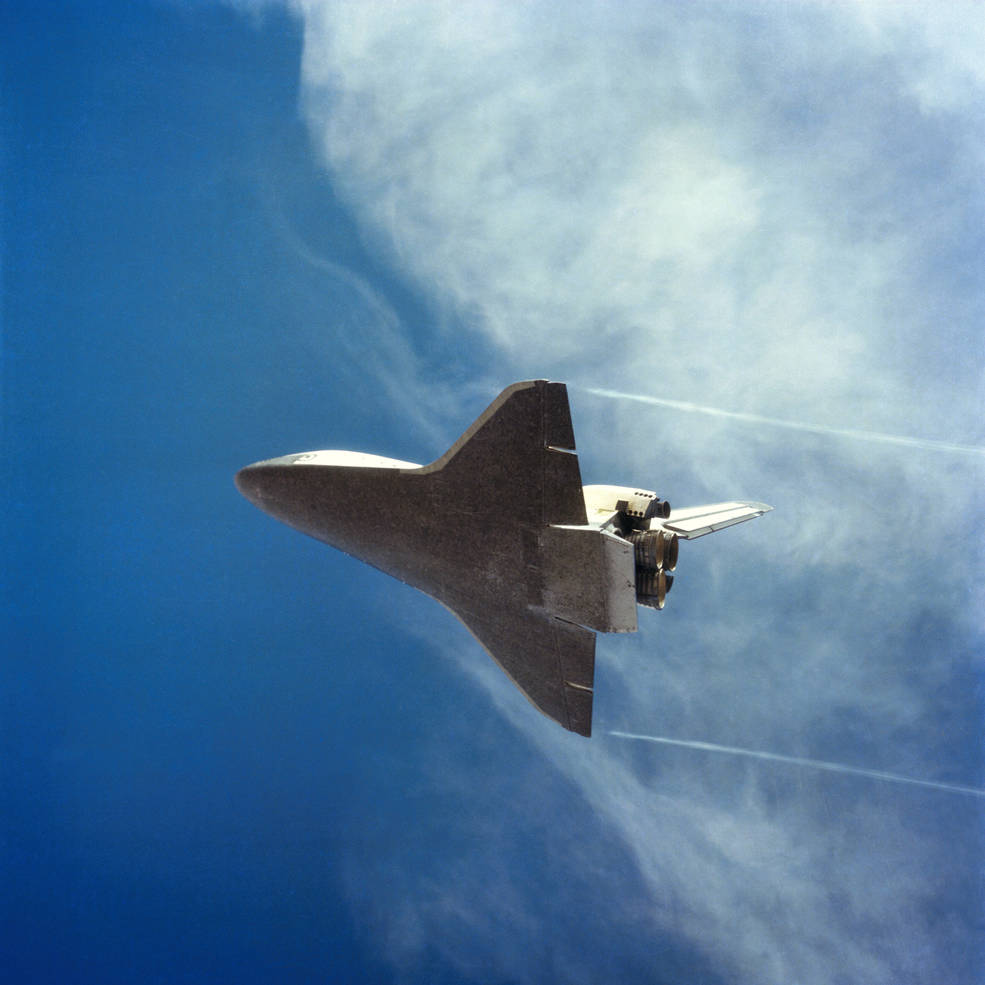
STS-2 on final approach, coming in for its landing after re-entry, on November 14, 1981.

Although the STS-2 mission had been planned for a duration of five days, with a few hours a day spent testing the Canadarm, the flight was cut short when one of the three fuel cells that produced electricity and drinking water failed. The mission was shortened to two days, and the Canadarm tests were canceled. The crew stayed awake during a scheduled sleep period and tested the arm anyway, working during the loss of signal (LOS) periods when they were not in contact with Mission Control. The deorbit and reentry phase of this mission differed from STS-1, in that while the first shuttle entry was flown as a "middle of the road" test of the automatic guidance, the success of that mission allowed for the STS-2 crew to explore the stability margins of the vehicle's performance. Twenty-nine planned Programmed Test Inputs (PTIs) were manually flown in the Control Stick Steering (CSS) mode, with Engle making use of his past experience in the X-15. These PTIs provided useful data for subsequent engineering modifications. Contrary to the interviewer's assertion in a JSC Oral history conversation with Engle, he hand flew maneuvers throughout the entire entry speed range, but not for the entire duration. As a consequence of STS-1 entry anomalies, the first roll maneuver was flown manually and the elevon scheduling was adjusted to offload the body flap.

Chase 1 crewed by astronauts "Hoot" Gibson and Kathy Sullivan escorted Columbia on final approach. Landing took place on Runway 23 at Edwards Air Force Base at 21:23 UTC, on November 14, 1981, after a 37-orbit flight which covered a total of 1,730,000 km (1,070,000 mi) over the course of 2 days, 6 hours, 13 minutes and 12 seconds.

In-house NASA documentary of STS-2.

Despite the truncated flight, more than 90% of the mission's objectives were achieved. Moreover, modifications of the water sound suppression system at the pad, to absorb the solid rocket booster overpressure wave during launch, were effective; no tiles were lost and only 12 were damaged. Columbia was flown back to the Kennedy Space Center on November 25, 1981.

STS-2 was the first Space Shuttle flight where O-ring blow-by was observed. After the damage was discovered, another O-ring was intentionally damaged to a further degree. It was then put through a flight simulation at three times the flight pressure. It survived the test, and was endorsed as flightworthy. This same problem would occur on fourteen more Shuttle flights, before contributing to the loss of orbiter Challenger in 1986.

STS-2 was the last shuttle flight to have its external fuel tank (ET) painted white. In an effort to reduce the Shuttle's overall weight, STS-3 and all subsequent missions used an unpainted tank, saving approximately 272 kg (600 lb) of launch weight. This lack of paint gave the ET a distinctive orange-brown color, which eventually became emblematic of the Space Shuttle.

Decades later, in 2006, some in the spaceflight community questioned whether the white paint would have prevented the ice-soaked foam shedding issue that led to the loss of Columbia. NASA consensus was that it would not.

== Experiments or tests ==
STS-2 payloads or experiments:

- OSTA-1
- Shuttle Imaging Radar
- SRMS, the Shuttle robotic arm, also known as Canadarm
- Shuttle Multispectral Infrared Radiometer
- Feature Identification and Location Experiment
- Measurement of Air Pollution from Satellites
- Ocean Color Experiment
- Night/Day optical Survey of Lightning
- Heflex Bioengineering Test
- Aerodynamic Coefficient Identification Package (ACIP)

They also tested the OMS engines.

== Mission insignia ==
The mission patch notes the names of the mission's two crew members, and includes an image of a bald eagle, the national bird of the United States, decorated with the colors of the U.S. flag.

== Wake-up calls ==
NASA began a tradition of playing music to astronauts during the Project Gemini, and first used music to wake up a flight crew during Apollo 15.

Flight Day	Song	Artist/Composer
Day 2	"Pigs in Space"	The Muppets
Day 3	"Columbia, Gem of the Ocean"	Flight Operations Directorate group Contraband

== Gallery ==
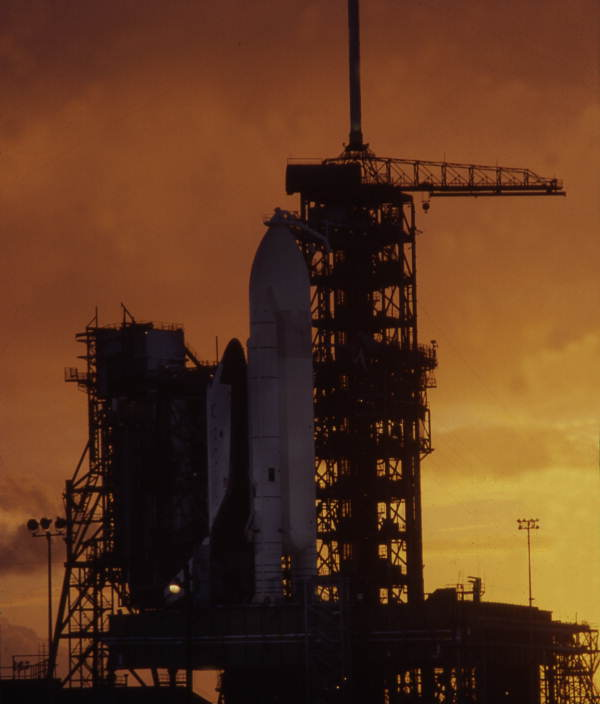
Columbia on launchpad

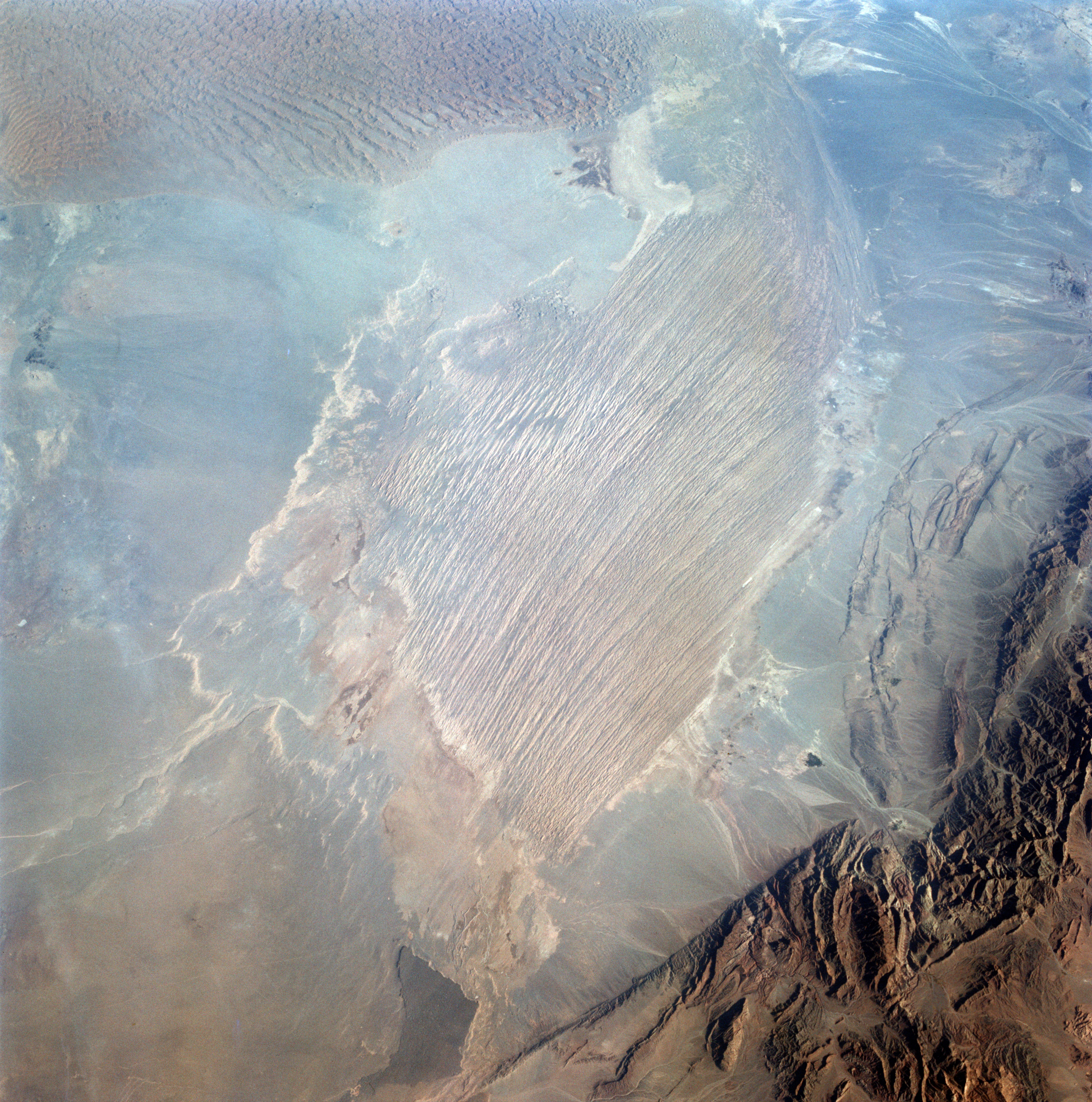
The Lut Desert as seen from orbit by STS-2.

== See also ==
- List of human spaceflights
- List of Space Shuttle missions
- Shuttle Radar Topography Mission
