= Shuttle Ejection Escape Suit =

American spacesuit

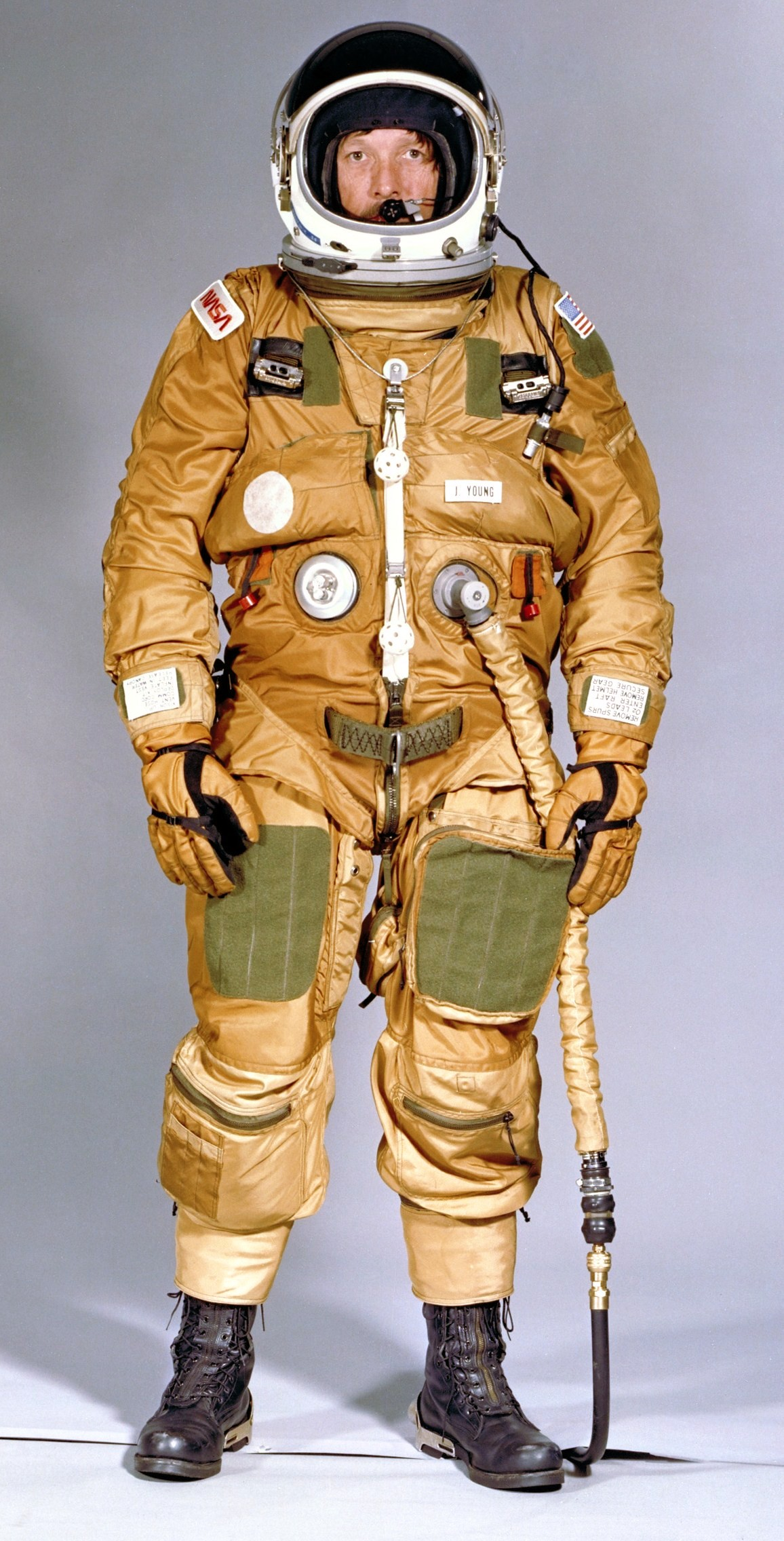
Shuttle Ejection Escape Suit

The Shuttle Ejection Escape Suit was used from STS-1 (1981) to STS-4 (1982) by a two-man crew used in conjunction with Space Shuttle Columbia's ejection seats. It allowed ejections up to Mach 2.7 and 24.4 km (80,000 ft). The suit was manufactured by the David Clark Company of Worcester, Massachusetts. It was derived from the USAF Model S1030 suit, which at the time, was being worn by SR-71 pilots. The Shuttle was certified as operational for STS-5, at which point the escape suits were replaced with light blue coveralls. The seats themselves were deactivated during STS-5 and removed before STS-9, with the intervening flights conducted by Space Shuttle Challenger, which did not have ejection seats.

== Specifications ==
- Name: Shuttle Ejection Escape Suit (S1030A)
- Derived from: USAF Model S1030
- Manufacturer: David Clark Company
- Missions: STS-1 to STS-4
- Function: Intra-vehicular activity (IVA) and Ejection
- Operating Pressure: 2.7 psi (18.6 kPa)
- Suit Weight: 40 lb (18 kg)
- Primary Life Support: Vehicle Provided
- Backup Life Support: Vehicle Provided

== Images ==
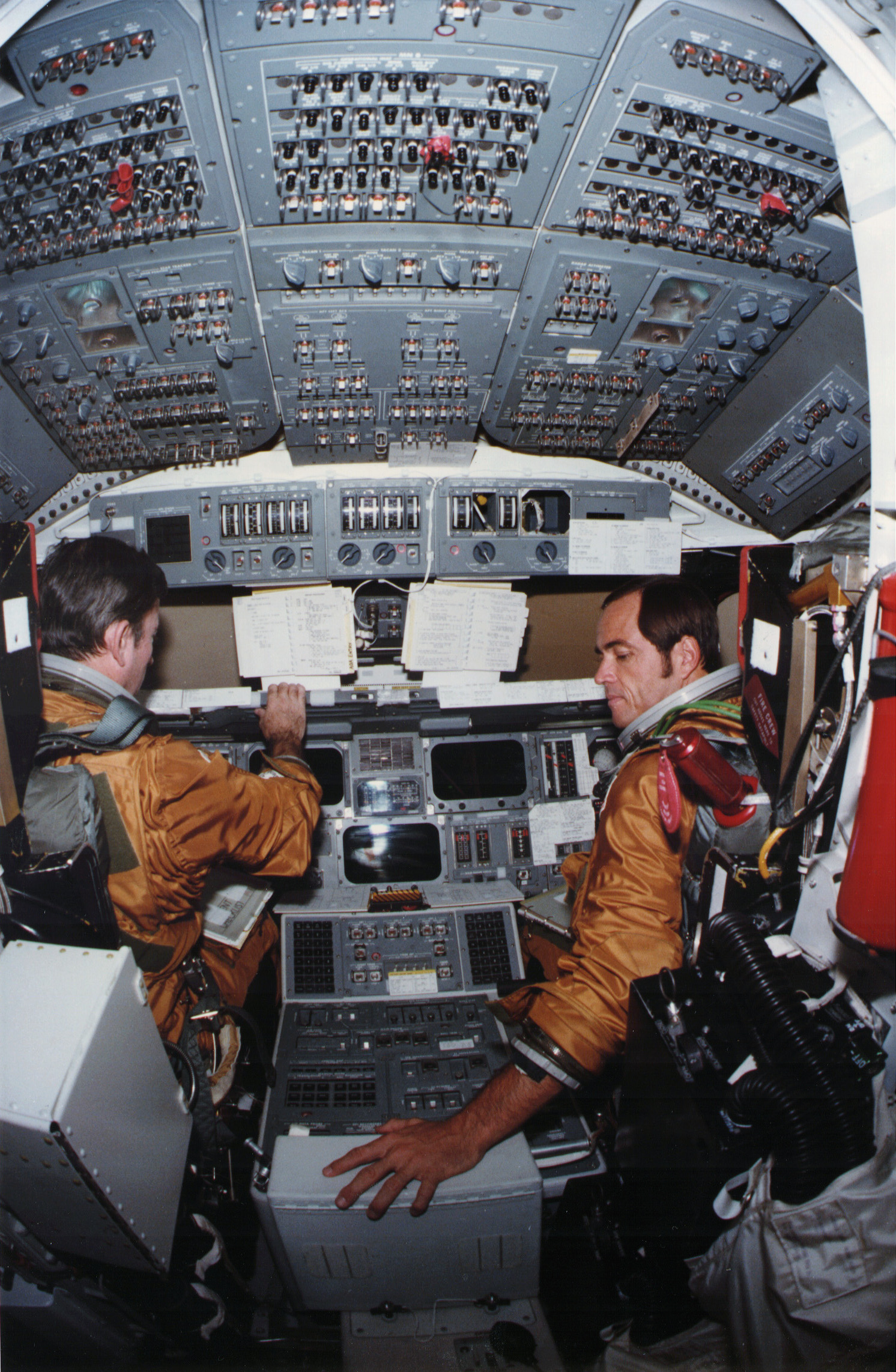

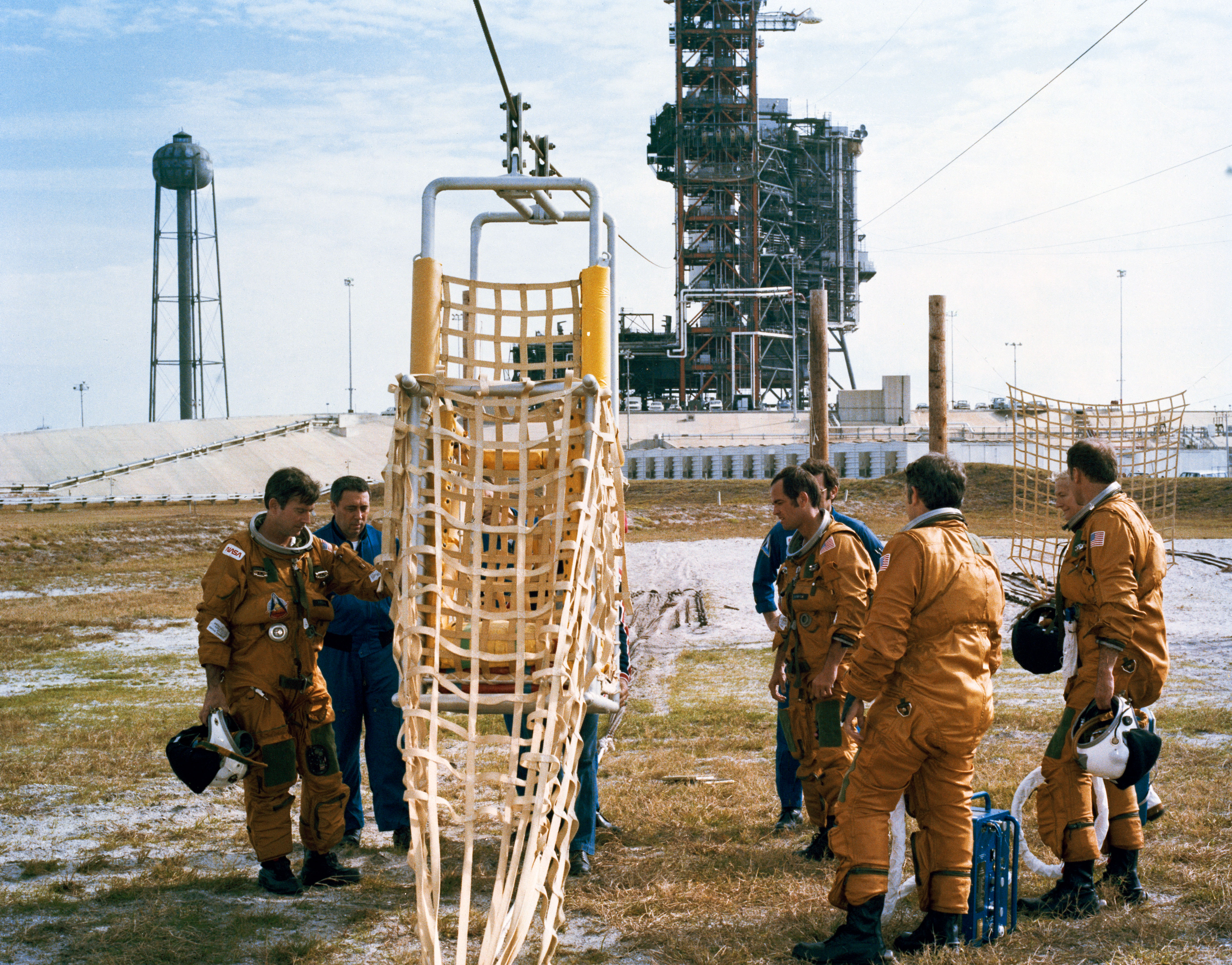

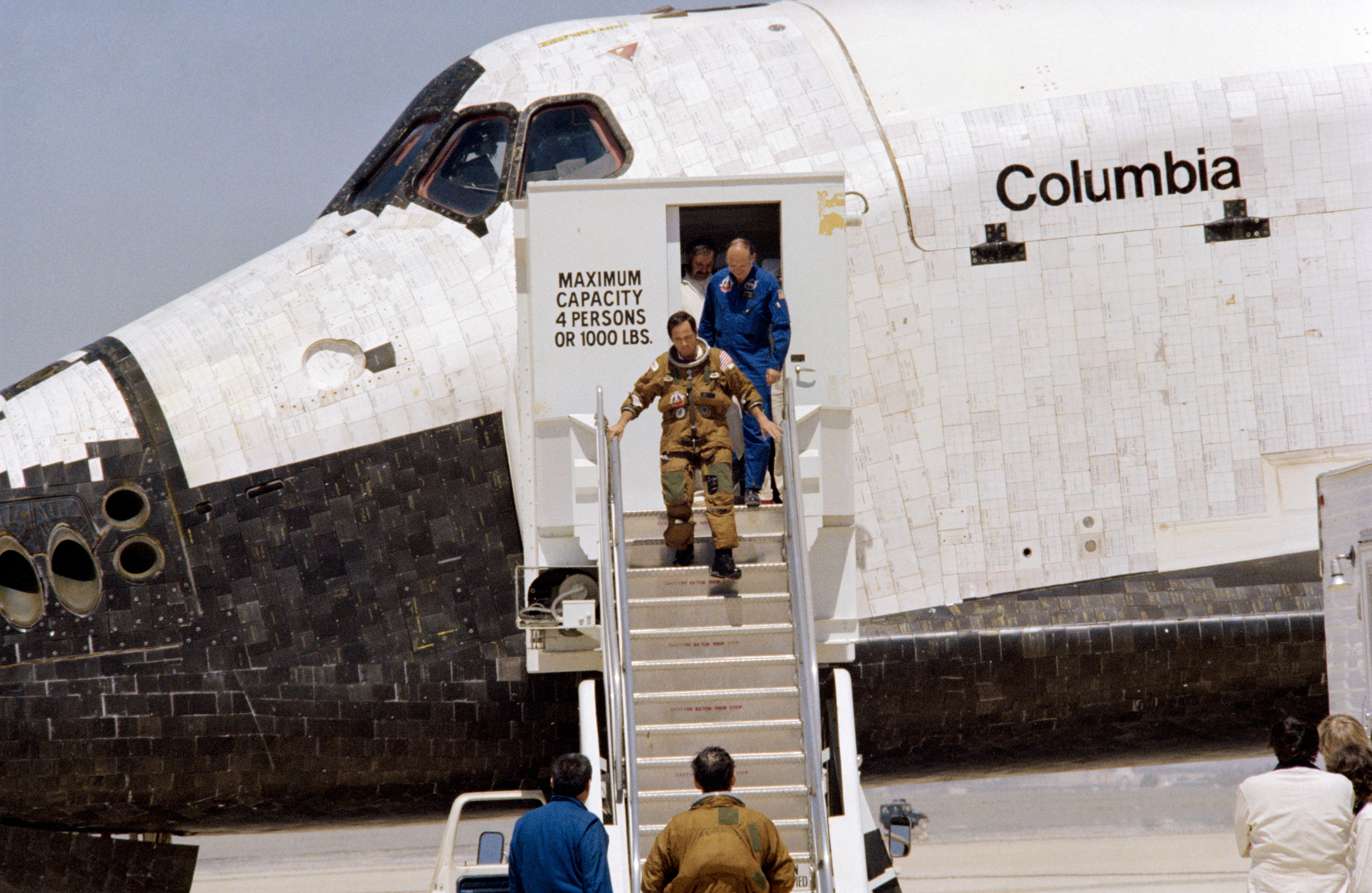

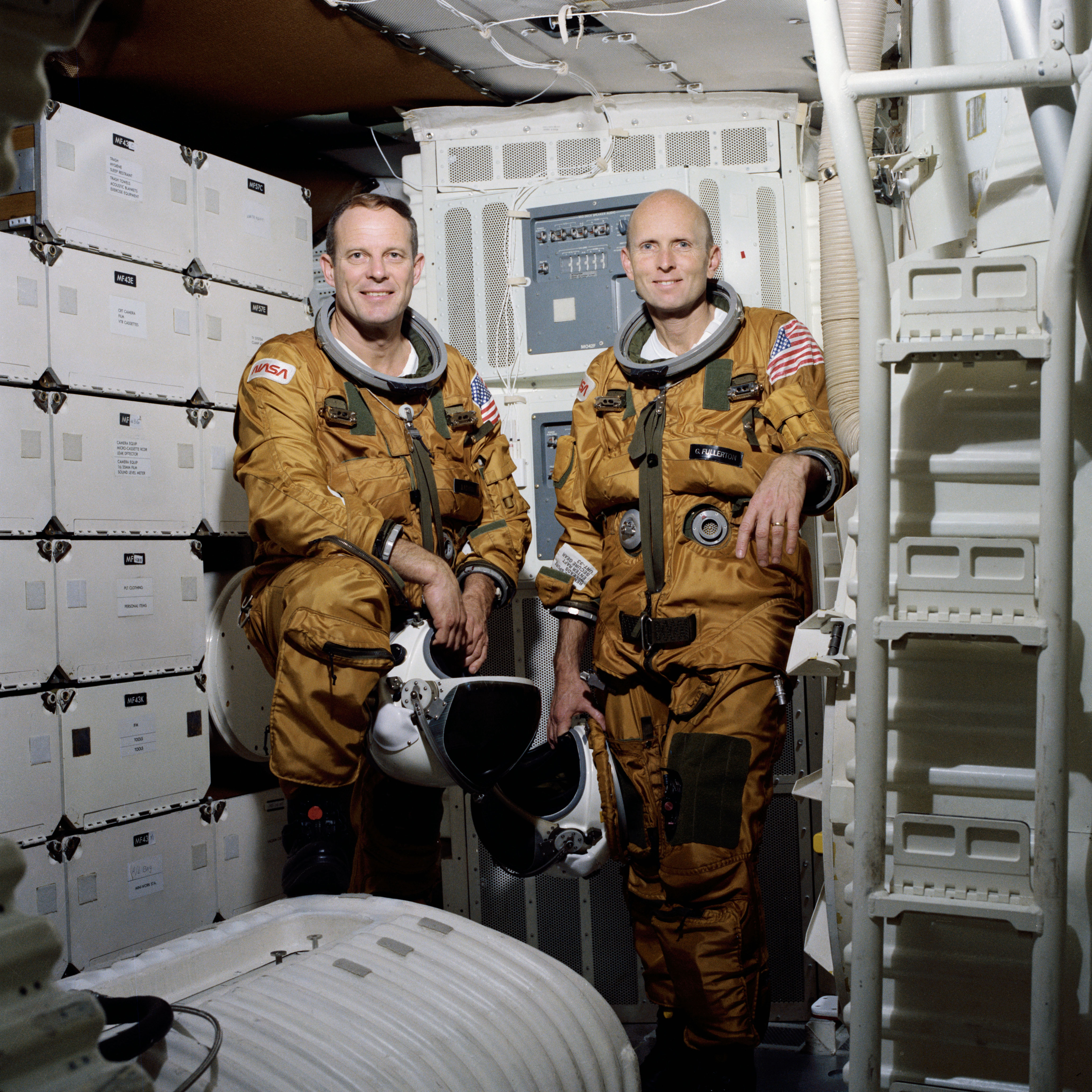
