= STS-41-D =

1984 American crewed spaceflight

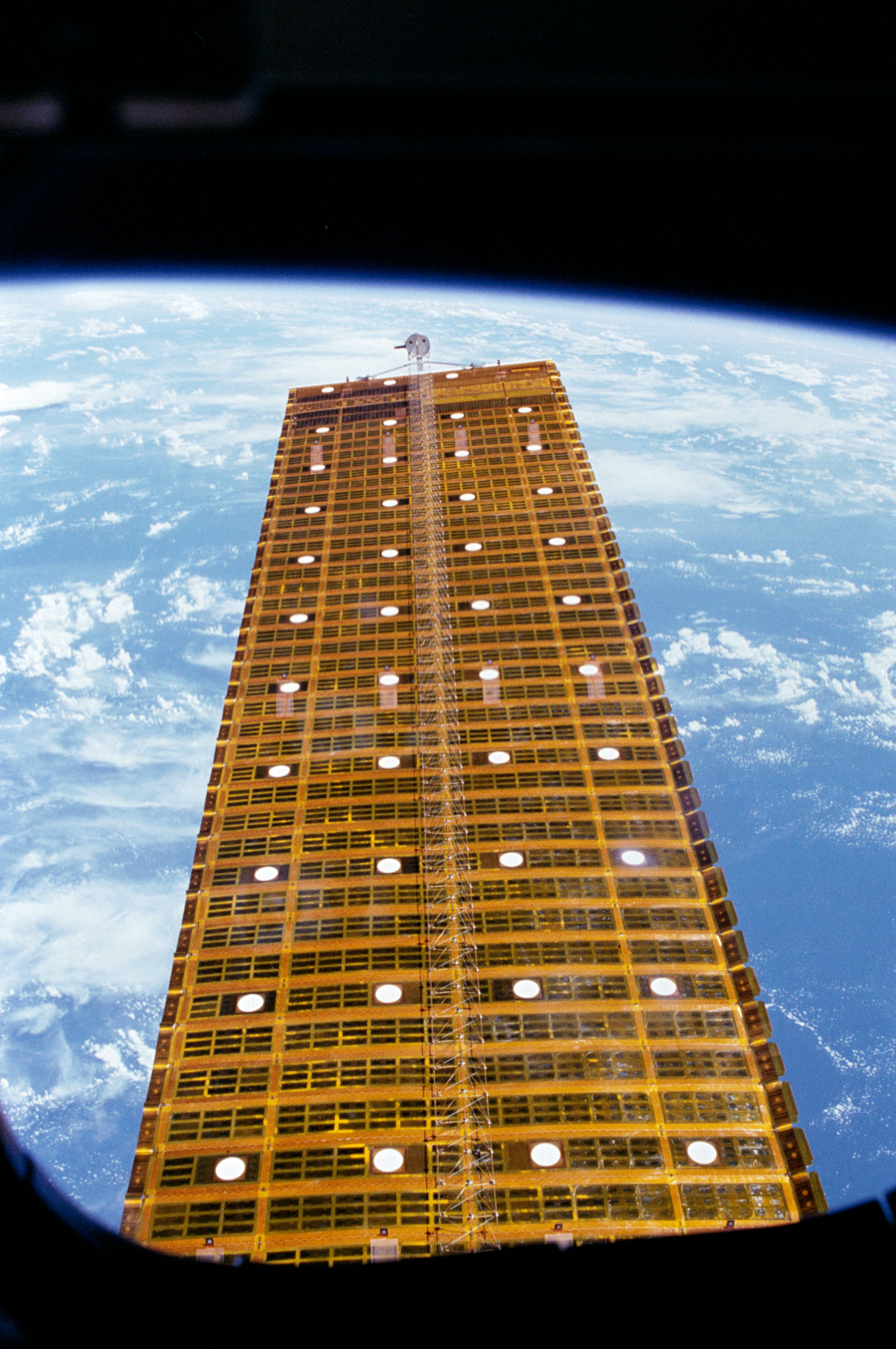
- The experimental OAST-1 solar array in flight
- Names: Space Transportation System-12
- Mission type: Satellites deployment
- Operator: NASA
- COSPAR ID: 1984-093A
- SATCAT no.: 15234
- Mission duration: 6 days, 56 minutes, 4 seconds
- Distance travelled: 4,010,000 km (2,490,000 mi)
- Orbits completed: 97

Spacecraft properties
- Spacecraft: Space Shuttle Discovery
- Launch mass: 119,511 kg (263,477 lb)
- Landing mass: 91,418 kg (201,542 lb)
- Payload mass: 18,681 kg (41,185 lb)

Crew
- Crew size: 6
- Members: Henry W. Hartsfield Jr.; Michael L. Coats; Richard M. Mullane; Steven A. Hawley; Judith A. Resnik; Charles D. Walker

Start of mission
- Launch date: August 30, 1984, 12:41:50 UTC (8:41:50 am EDT)
- Launch site: Kennedy, LC-39A
- Contractor: Rockwell International

End of mission
- Landing date: September 5, 1984, 13:37:54 UTC (6:37:54 am PDT)
- Landing site: Edwards, Runway 17

Orbital parameters
- Reference system: Geocentric orbit
- Regime: Low Earth orbit
- Perigee altitude: 346 km (215 mi)
- Apogee altitude: 354 km (220 mi)
- Inclination: 28.50°
- Period: 90.60 minutes

Instruments
- Continuous Flow Electrophoresis System (CFES)
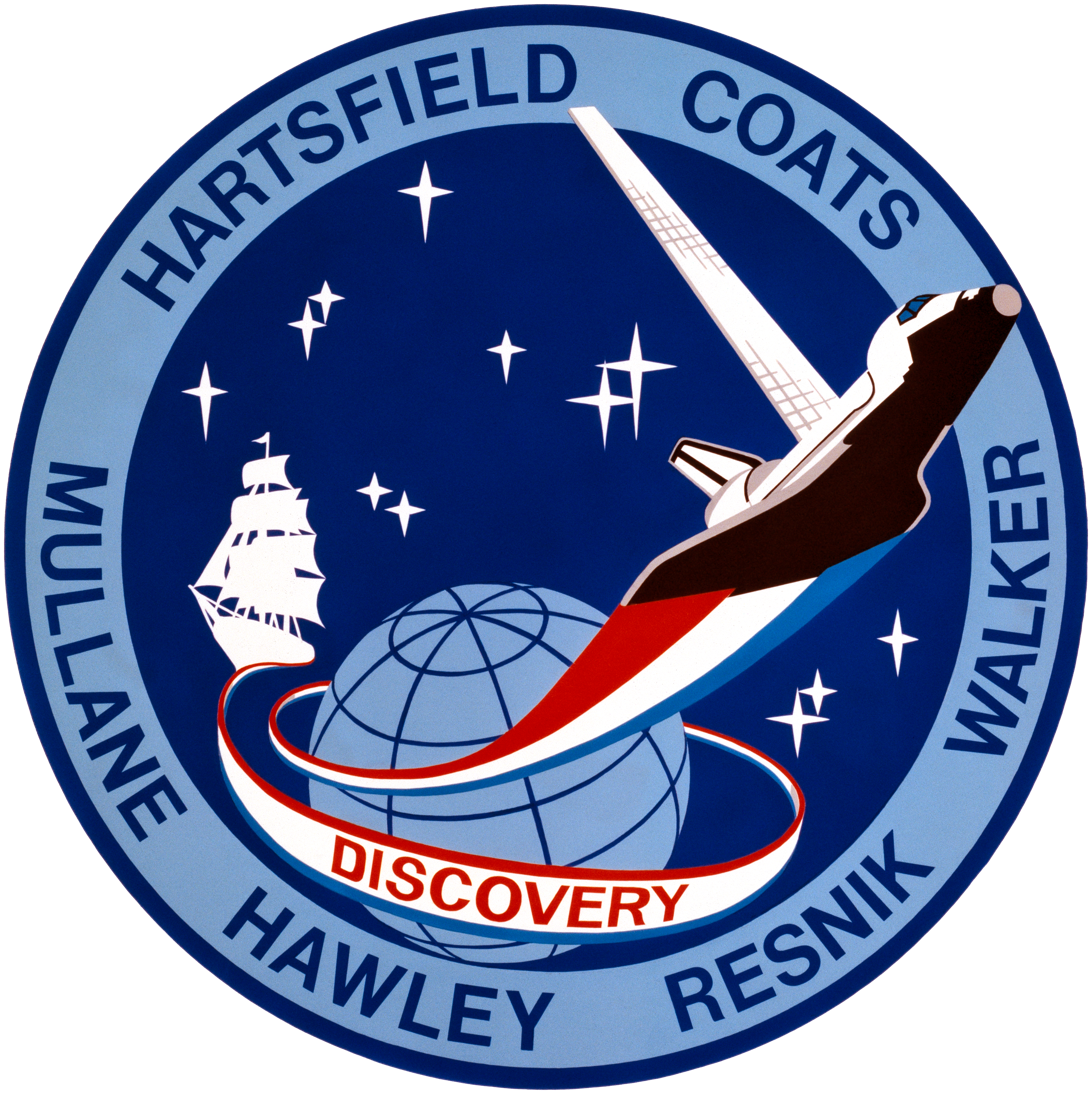
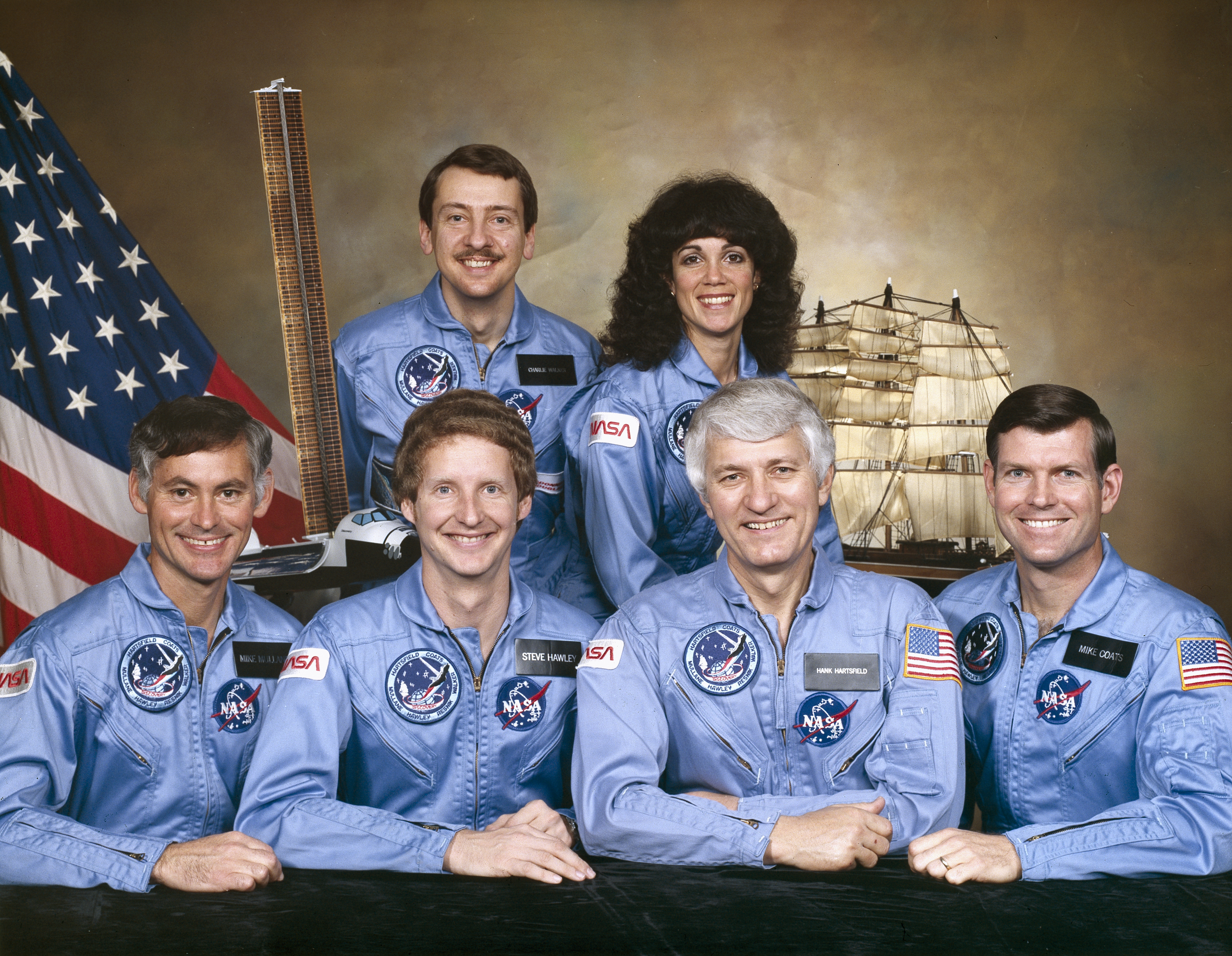
- STS-41-D mission patch Back row: Walker and Resnik; Front row: Mullane, Hawley, Hartsfield and Coats Space Shuttle program

STS-41-D (formerly STS-14) was the 12th flight of NASA's Space Shuttle program, and the maiden flight of Space Shuttle Discovery. It was launched from Kennedy Space Center, Florida, on August 30, 1984, and landed at Edwards Air Force Base, California, on September 5, 1984. Three commercial communications satellites were deployed into orbit during the six-day mission, and a number of scientific experiments were conducted, including a prototype extendable solar array that would eventually form the basis of the main solar arrays on the International Space Station (ISS).

The mission was delayed by more than two months from its original planned launch date, having experienced the Space Shuttle program's first launch abort at T−4 seconds on June 26, 1984.

== Crew ==
Position	Astronaut
Commander	Henry W. Hartsfield Jr. Second spaceflight
Pilot	Michael L. Coats; First spaceflight
Mission Specialist 1	Richard M. Mullane; First spaceflight
Mission Specialist 2 Flight Engineer	Steven A. Hawley; First spaceflight
Mission Specialist 3	Judith A. Resnik; First space mission Only spaceflight
Payload Specialist 1	Charles D. Walker; First spaceflight

=== Crew seat assignments ===
Seat	Launch	Landing	Seats 1–4 are on the flight deck. Seats 5–7 are on the mid-deck.
1	Hartsfield		Seats 1–4 are on the flight deck. Seats 5–7 are on the mid-deck.
2	Coats		Seats 1–4 are on the flight deck. Seats 5–7 are on the mid-deck.
3	Mullane	Resnik	Seats 1–4 are on the flight deck. Seats 5–7 are on the mid-deck.
4	Hawley		Seats 1–4 are on the flight deck. Seats 5–7 are on the mid-deck.
5	Resnik	Mullane	Seats 1–4 are on the flight deck. Seats 5–7 are on the mid-deck.
6	Walker		Seats 1–4 are on the flight deck. Seats 5–7 are on the mid-deck.
7	Unused		Seats 1–4 are on the flight deck. Seats 5–7 are on the mid-deck.

== Mission background ==
The launch was originally planned for June 25, 1984, but because of a variety of technical problems, including rollback to the Vehicle Assembly Building (VAB) to replace a faulty Space Shuttle Main Engine (SSME), the launch was delayed by over two months. The June 26, 1984, launch attempt marked the first time since Gemini 6A that a crewed spacecraft had experienced a shutdown of its engines just prior to launch.

=== June 1984 launch attempt ===
During the June 26, 1984, launch attempt, there was a launch abort at T−4 seconds, followed by a pad fire about ten minutes later. Because the center engine had not started when the abort was triggered, confusion ensued as the flight controllers were unable to verify its state:

Commentary: "We have a cut off".
"NTD [NASA Test Director] we have a RSLS [Redundant Set Launch Sequencer] abort".

Commentary: "We have an abort by the onboard computers of the orbiter Discovery".
"Break break, break break, GLS [Ground Launch Sequencer] shows engine one not shut down".
"OK, PLT [pilot]?"
"CSME [Space Shuttle Main Engines] verify engine one".
"You want me to shut down engine one?"
"We do not show engine start on one".
"OTC [Orbiter test conductor] I can verify shutdown on verify on engine one, we haven't start prepped engine one".
"All engines shut down I can verify that".

Commentary: "We can now verify all three engines have been shut down".
"We have red lights on engines two and three in the cockpit, not on one".
"All right, CSME verify engine one safe for APU [auxiliary power unit] shutdown".
"If I can verify that?"
"OTC GPC [General Purpose Computer] go for APU shutdown".

Mission Specialist Steve Hawley was reported as saying following the abort: "Gee, I thought we'd be a lot higher at MECO (Main Engine Cut-Off)!". About ten minutes later, the following was heard on live TV coverage:

"We have indication two of our fire detectors on the zero level; no response. They're side by side right next to the engine area. The engineer requested that we turn on the heat shield fire water which is what could be seen spraying up in the vicinity of the engine bells of Discovery's three main engines".

While evacuating the shuttle 20 minutes later, the crew was doused with water from the pad deluge system, which was activated due to a hydrogen fire on the launch pad caused by the free hydrogen (fuel) that had collected around the engine nozzles following the shutdown and engine anomaly. Because the fire was invisible to humans, had the astronauts used the normal emergency escape procedure across the service arm to the slidewire escape baskets, they would have run into the fire.

Changes to procedures resulting from the abort included more practicing of "safing" the orbiter following aborts at various points, the use of the fire suppression system in all pad aborts, and the testing of the slidewire escape system with a real person (Charles F. Bolden Jr.). It emerged that launch controllers were reluctant to order the crew to evacuate during the STS-41-D abort, as the slidewire had not been ridden by a human.

Examination of telemetry data indicated that the engine malfunction had been caused by a stuck valve that prevented proper flow of LOX into the combustion chamber.

== Mission summary ==
STS-41-D launched at 08:41:50 a.m. EDT on August 30, 1984, after a six-minute, fifty-second delay when a private aircraft flew into the restricted airspace near the launch pad. It was the fourth launch attempt for Discovery. Because of the two-month delay, the STS-41-F mission was canceled (STS-41-E had already been canceled), and its primary payloads were included on the STS-41-D flight. The combined cargo weighed over 18,681 kg (41,185 lb), a record for a Space Shuttle payload up to that time.

The six-person flight crew consisted of Henry W. Hartsfield Jr., commander, making his second shuttle mission; pilot Michael L. Coats; three mission specialists – Judith A. Resnik, Richard M. Mullane and Steven A. Hawley; and a payload specialist, Charles D. Walker, an employee of McDonnell Douglas. Walker was the first commercially sponsored payload specialist to fly aboard the Space Shuttle. Resnik became the second American woman to fly any NASA space mission, after Sally K. Ride.

Primary cargo of Discovery consisted of three commercial communications satellites: SBS-4 for Satellite Business Systems, Telstar 302 for Telesat of Canada, and Syncom IV-2, or Leasat-2, a Hughes-built satellite leased to the U.S. Navy; all three were Hughes-built satellites. Leasat-2 was the first large communications satellite designed specifically to be deployed from the Space Shuttle. All three satellites were deployed successfully and became operational.

Another payload was the OAST-1 solar array, a device 4 m (13 ft) wide and 31 m (102 ft) high, which folded into a package 18 cm (7.1 in) deep. The array carried a number of different types of experimental solar cells and was extended to its full height several times during the mission. At the time, it was the largest structure ever extended from a crewed spacecraft, and it demonstrated the feasibility of large lightweight solar arrays for use on future orbital installations, such as the International Space Station (ISS).

The McDonnell Douglas-sponsored Continuous Flow Electrophoresis System (CFES) experiment, using living cells, was more elaborate than the one flown on previous missions, and payload specialist Walker operated it for more than 100 hours during the flight. A student experiment to study crystal growth in microgravity was also carried out. The highlights of the mission were filmed using an IMAX motion picture camera, and later appeared in the 1985 documentary film The Dream is Alive. On September 3, 1984, concern arose over the formation of ice on the waste dump nozzle of the shuttle. The cause was an obstruction in the shuttle's external wastewater dumping system that caused a 61 cm (24 in) "pee-sicle" to form during the mission; Hartsfield removed it with the Remote Manipulator System (Canadarm) the following day.

The mission lasted 6 days, 0 hour, 56 minutes, and 4 seconds, with landing taking place on Runway 17 at Edwards Air Force Base at 06:37:54 a.m. PDT on September 5, 1984. During STS-41-D, Discovery traveled a total of 4,010,000 km (2,490,000 mi) and made 97 orbits. The orbiter was transported back to KSC on September 10, 1984. Ominously, STS-41-D was the first Shuttle mission in which blow-by damage to the SRB O-rings was discovered, with a small amount of soot found beyond the primary O-ring. Following the Challenger disaster, Morton Thiokol engineer Brian Russell called this finding the first "big red flag" on SRB Joint and O-ring safety.

== Launch attempts ==
Attempt	Planned	Result	Turnaround	Reason	Decision point	Weather go (%)	Notes
1	25 Jun 1984, 8:43:00 am	Scrubbed	—	Technical	(T−00:09:00 hold)		Failure of Orbiter's backup General Purpose Computer.
2	26 Jun 1984, 8:43:00 am	Scrubbed	1 day 0 hours 0 minutes	Technical	26 Jun 1984, 8:42 am (T−00:00:04)	40	Post-SSME start RSLS Abort due to anomaly in number three engine. Discovery returned to OPF for engine replacement.
3	29 Aug 1984, 8:35:00 am	Scrubbed	63 days 23 hours 52 minutes	Technical	28 Aug 1984, 12:00 am		Discrepancy with master events controller relating to SRB fire commands.
4	30 Aug 1984, 8:41:50 am	Success	1 day 0 hours 7 minutes				Delayed 6 minutes, 50 seconds when private aircraft strayed into airspace.

== Mission insignia ==
The 12 stars within the blue field indicate the flight's original numerical designation as STS-12 in the Space Transportation System's mission sequence. A representation of Discovery's namesake is manifested in a sailing ship, which is linked to the Shuttle (with the OAST solar array in the payload bay) via a red, white, and blue path, signifying its maiden voyage.

== Wake-up calls ==
NASA began a tradition of playing music to astronauts during the Project Gemini, and first used music to wake up a flight crew during Apollo 15. Each track is specially chosen, often by the astronauts' families, and usually has a special meaning to an individual member of the crew, or is applicable to their daily activities.

Flight Day	Song	Artist/Composer
Day 2	"Anchors Aweigh"	Charles A. Zimmerman
Day 3	"Telstar"	The Ventures
Day 4	"Mr. Spaceman"	The Byrds
Day 5	"Hair"	Broadway cast
Day 6	"Eight Miles High"	The Byrds

== Gallery ==
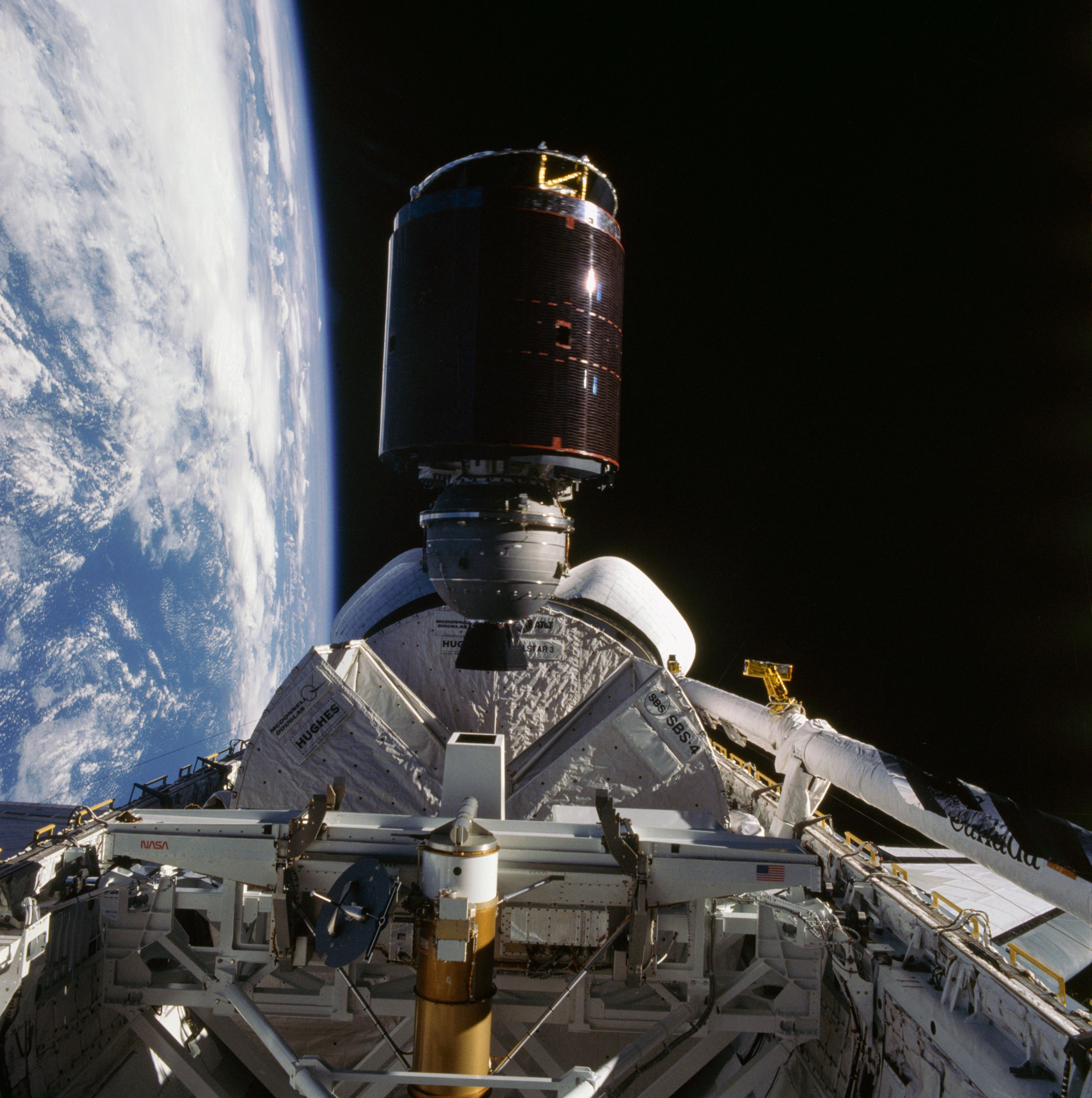
SBS-D deployment

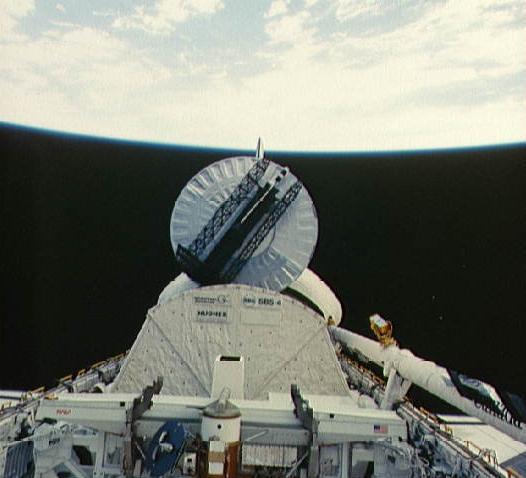
Syncom IV-2 deployment

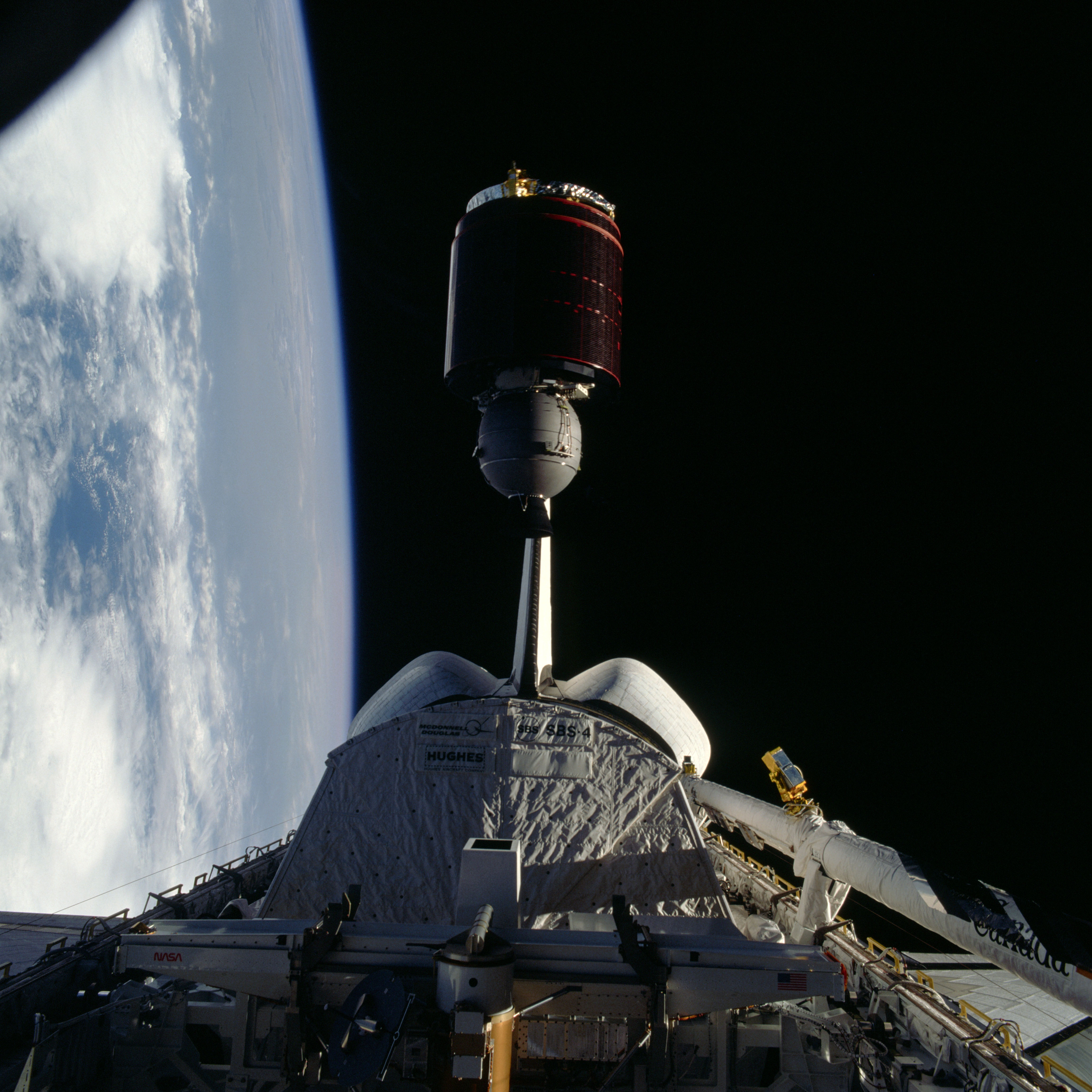
Telstar 3C deployment

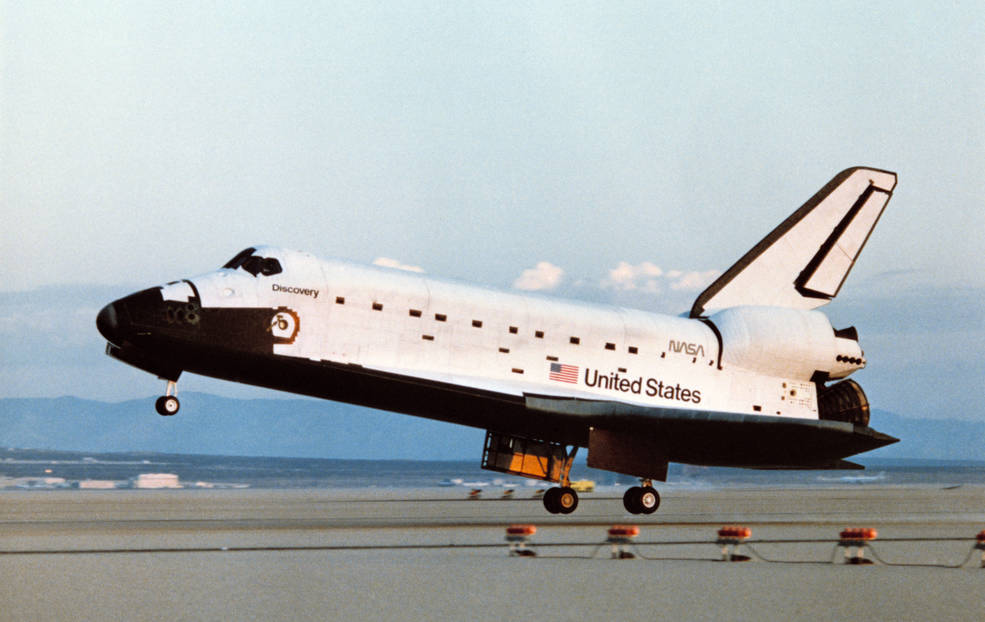
Discovery lands at Edwards Air Force Base

== See also ==
- List of human spaceflights
- List of Space Shuttle missions
