= Michael Coats =

American aerospace engineer, test pilot, and astronaut (born 1946)

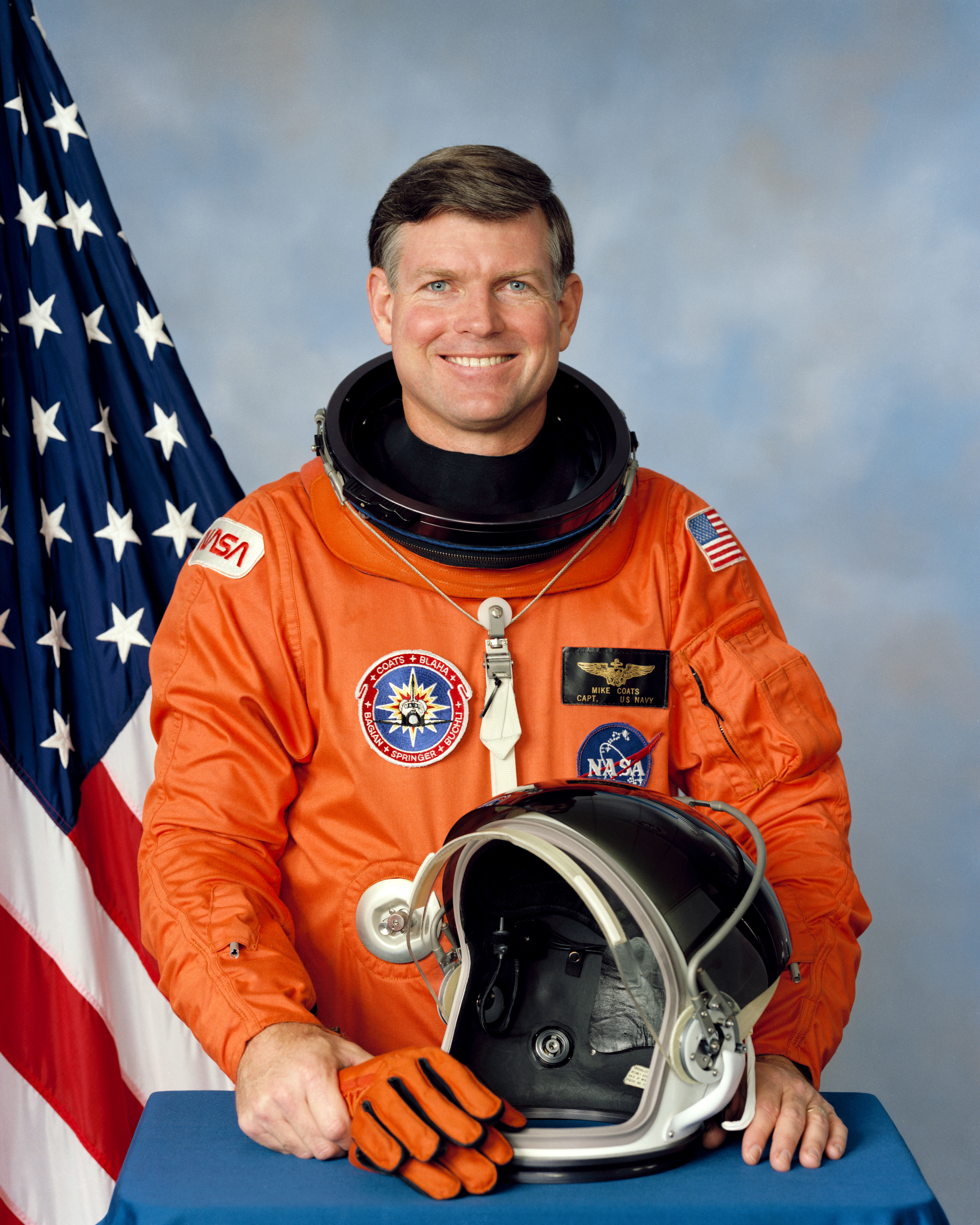
- Born: Michael Lloyd Coats; January 16, 1946 (age 80); Sacramento, California, U.S.
- Education: United States Naval Academy (BS); George Washington University (MS); Naval Postgraduate School (MS)
- Space career

NASA astronaut
- Rank: Captain, USN
- Time in space: 19d 7h 56m
- Selection: NASA Group 8 (1978)
- Missions: STS-41-D; STS-29; STS-39

Michael Lloyd Coats (born January 16, 1946) is a former NASA astronaut (three spaceflights) and US Navy Test Pilot. From December 2005 to December 2012, he served as Director of the Johnson Space Center in Houston, Texas.

== Early life and education ==
Coats was born January 16, 1946, in Sacramento, California. He was raised in Riverside, California, and graduated from Ramona High School in 1964. He received a Bachelor of Science degree from the United States Naval Academy in 1968, a Master of Science degree in Administration of Science and Technology from George Washington University in 1977, and a Master of Science degree in Aeronautical Engineering from the U.S. Naval Postgraduate School in 1979.

== Military career ==
Coats graduated from the U.S. Naval Academy in 1968 and was designated a Naval Aviator in September 1969. After training as an A-7E pilot, he was assigned to Attack Squadron 192 (VA-192) from August 1970 to September 1972 aboard the aircraft carrier USS Kitty Hawk and, during this time, flew 315 combat missions in Southeast Asia. He served as a flight instructor with the A-7E Readiness Training Squadron (VA-122) at Naval Air Station Lemoore, California, from September 1972 to December 1973, and was then selected to attend the U.S. Naval Test Pilot School at Naval Air Station Patuxent River, Maryland.

Following test pilot training in 1974, he was project officer and test pilot for the A-7 and A-4 aircraft at the Strike Aircraft Test Directorate. He served as a flight instructor at the U.S. Naval Test Pilot School from April 1976 until May 1977. He then attended the U.S. Naval Postgraduate School at Monterey, California, from June 1977 until his selection for the astronaut candidate program.

He has logged over 5,000 hours flying time in 28 different types of aircraft, and 400 carrier landings.

== NASA career ==
=== Selection and training ===
Selected as an astronaut candidate in 1978, Coats became a NASA astronaut in August 1979. He was a member of the STS-4 astronaut support crew, and was a capsule communicator (CAPCOM) for STS-4 and STS-5. A veteran of three space flights, Coats flew on STS-41-D in 1984, STS-29 in 1989, and STS-39 in 1991. From May 1989 to March 1990, he served as Acting Chief of the Astronaut Office.

=== STS-41-D ===
On his first mission, Coats was pilot on the crew of STS-41-D, which launched from Kennedy Space Center, Florida, on August 30, 1984. This was the maiden flight of the Orbiter Discovery. The mission was delayed three times over a two-month period prior to liftoff. Delays included the first pad abort of the Shuttle program (and the first for NASA since Gemini 6A) as well as a fire on the launch pad. During this 6-day mission the crew successfully activated the OAST-1 solar cell wing experiment, deployed three satellites (SBS-D, SYNCOM IV-2, and TELSTAR 3-C), operated the CFES-III experiment, the student crystal growth experiment, and photography experiments using the IMAX motion picture camera. The crew earned the name "Icebusters" in successfully removing hazardous ice particles from the orbiter using the Remote Manipulator System. STS-41-D completed 96 orbits of the Earth before landing at Edwards Air Force Base, California, on September 5, 1984.

=== STS-61-H ===
In February 1985, Coats was selected as the commander of STS-61-H, which was subsequently canceled after the Challenger accident.

=== STS-29 ===
As commander of STS-29, Coats and his crew launched from Kennedy Space Center aboard Discovery on March 13, 1989. During this highly successful five-day mission, the crew deployed a Tracking and Data Relay Satellite (TDRS), and performed numerous secondary experiments, including a Space Station "heat pipe" radiator experiment, two student experiments, a protein crystal growth experiment, and a chromosome and plant cell division experiment. In addition, the crew took over 3,000 photographs of the earth using several types of cameras, including the IMAX 70 mm movie camera. Mission duration was 80 orbits and concluded with a landing at Edwards Air Force Base, California, on March 18, 1989. With the completion of his second mission, Coats has logged a total of 264 hours in space.

=== STS-39 ===
Coats commanded a seven-man crew on STS-39, an unclassified eight-day Department of Defense mission launched from the Kennedy Space Center, Florida on April 28, 1991. Crew members worked around the clock in two-shift operations during which they deployed, operated and retrieved the SPAS-II spacecraft, in addition to conducting various science experiments including research of both natural and induced phenomena in the Earth's atmosphere. After completing 134 orbits of the Earth, Discovery and her crew landed at the Kennedy Space Center, Florida on May 6, 1991. With the completion of his third mission, Coats has logged over 463 hours in space.

=== Johnson Space Center director ===
In November 2005, Coats was hired as the 10th director of the Johnson Space Center (JSC). Coats retired from NASA on December 31, 2012.

== Post-astronaut career ==
Coats left the astronaut corps and retired from the US Navy in 1991 to work for Loral Space Information Systems From 1991 to 1996, Coats served as Vice President of Avionics and Communications Operations for Loral Space Information Systems, from 1996 to 1998 he was Vice President of Civil Space Programs for Lockheed Martin Missiles and Space in Sunnyvale, California, and from 1998 to 2005 he was Vice President of Advanced Space Transportation for Lockheed Martin Space Systems Company in Denver, Colorado.

== Organizations ==
- Member, Society of Experimental Test Pilots;
- Associate Fellow, American Institute of Aeronautics and Astronautics.

== Honors ==
Coats was awarded the Defense Superior Service Medal, 3 Navy Distinguished Flying Crosses, 32 Strike Flight Air Medals, 3 Individual Action Air Medals, 9 Navy Commendation Medals with Combat "V", and the NASA Space Flight Medal.
