= STS-4 =

1982 American crewed spaceflight and final Space Shuttle test flight

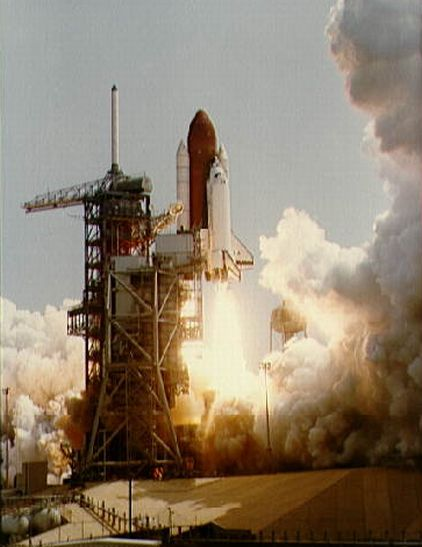
- Columbia begins its final test flight from Launch Complex 39A of KSC
- Names: Space Transportation System-4
- Mission type: Flight test
- Operator: NASA
- COSPAR ID: 1982-065A
- SATCAT no.: 13300
- Mission duration: 7 days, 1 hour, 9 minutes, 31 seconds
- Distance travelled: 4,700,000 km (2,900,000 mi)
- Orbits completed: 113

Spacecraft properties
- Spacecraft: Space Shuttle Columbia
- Launch mass: 109,616 kg (241,662 lb)
- Landing mass: 94,774 kg (208,941 lb)
- Payload mass: 11,109 kg (24,491 lb)

Crew
- Crew size: 2
- Members: Ken Mattingly; Henry Hartsfield

Start of mission
- Launch date: 15:00, June 27, 1982 (UTC) (11:00 am EDT)
- Launch site: Kennedy, LC-39A
- Contractor: Rockwell International

End of mission
- Landing date: July 4, 1982, 16:09:40 UTC (9:09:40 am PDT)
- Landing site: Edwards, Runway 22

Orbital parameters
- Reference system: Geocentric orbit
- Regime: Low Earth orbit
- Perigee altitude: 295 km (183 mi)
- Apogee altitude: 302 km (188 mi)
- Inclination: 28.50°
- Period: 90.30 minutes
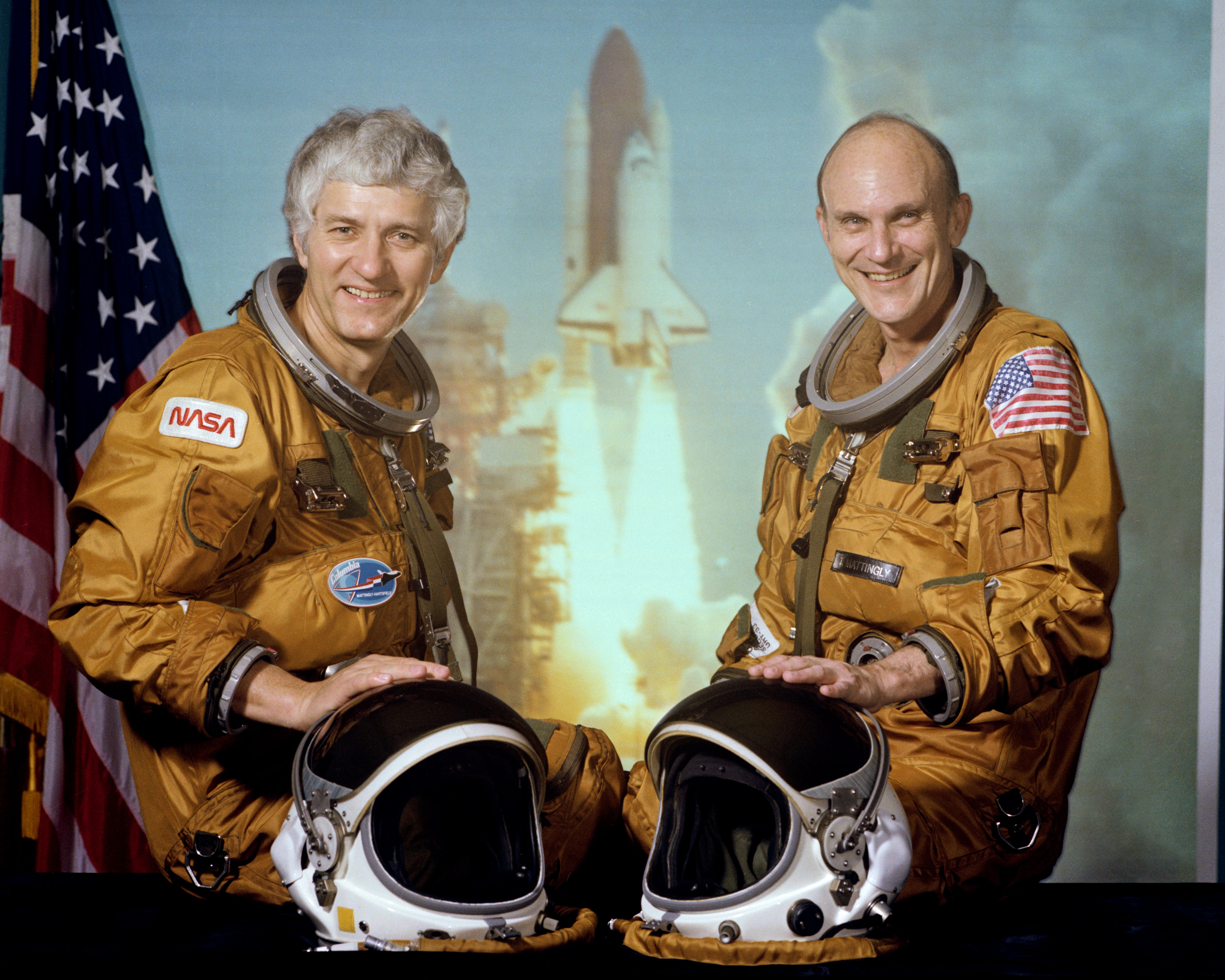
- STS-4 mission patch Hartsfield and Mattingly Space Shuttle program

STS-4 was the fourth NASA Space Shuttle mission, and also the fourth for Space Shuttle Columbia. Crewed by Ken Mattingly and Henry Hartsfield, the mission launched on June 27, 1982, and landed a week later on July 4, 1982. Due to parachute malfunctions, the SRBs were not recovered.

STS-4 was the final test flight for the Space Shuttle; it was thereafter officially declared to be operational. Columbia carried numerous scientific payloads during the mission, as well as military missile detection systems.

== Crew ==
Position	Astronaut
Commander	Ken Mattingly; Second spaceflight
Pilot	Henry Hartsfield; First spaceflight

STS-4, being the last test flight of the Space Shuttle, was also the last to carry a crew of two astronauts. Commander Ken Mattingly had previously flown as Command Module Pilot on Apollo 16, and was also the original Command Module Pilot for Apollo 13 before being replaced by his backup, Jack Swigert, after being exposed to German measles. Pilot Henry Hartsfield was a rookie astronaut who had transferred to NASA in 1969 after the cancellation of the Air Force's Manned Orbiting Laboratory (MOL) program. He had previously served as a capsule communicator (CAPCOM) on Apollo 16, all three Skylab missions, and STS-1. Both men had graduated from Auburn University, the only time an entire Space Shuttle flight crew were graduates of the same university.

=== Backup crew ===
From STS-4 onwards, NASA halted the appointment and training of complete backup flight crews. Instead, individual flight crew members were assigned backups who could take their place within the prime crew. The decision on whether to appoint a reserve crew member was made on a per-flight basis by flight management teams at Johnson Space Center. Consequently, the last NASA flight to have a full-time backup crew was STS-3.

=== Support crew ===
- Roy D. Bridges Jr. (entry CAPCOM)
- Michael L. Coats
- S. David Griggs (ascent CAPCOM)
- George D. Nelson
- Brewster H. Shaw

=== Crew seat assignments ===
Seat	Launch	Landing	Seats 1–4 are on the flight deck. Seats 5–7 are on the mid-deck.
1	Mattingly		Seats 1–4 are on the flight deck. Seats 5–7 are on the mid-deck.
2	Hartsfield		Seats 1–4 are on the flight deck. Seats 5–7 are on the mid-deck.
3	Unused		Seats 1–4 are on the flight deck. Seats 5–7 are on the mid-deck.
4	Unused		Seats 1–4 are on the flight deck. Seats 5–7 are on the mid-deck.
5	Unused		Seats 1–4 are on the flight deck. Seats 5–7 are on the mid-deck.
6	Unused		Seats 1–4 are on the flight deck. Seats 5–7 are on the mid-deck.
7	Unused		Seats 1–4 are on the flight deck. Seats 5–7 are on the mid-deck.

== Mission summary ==
STS-4 launched from Kennedy Space Center (KSC) on June 27, 1982, at 15:00:00 UTC (10:00 a.m. local time), with Ken Mattingly as commander and Henry Hartsfield as pilot. This mission marked the first time the Space Shuttle launched precisely at its scheduled launch time. It was also the last research and development flight in the program, after which NASA considered the shuttle operational. After this flight, Columbia's ejection seats were deactivated, and shuttle crews did not wear pressure suits again until STS-26 in 1988.

STS-4's cargo consisted of the first Getaway Special (GAS) payloads, including nine scientific experiments provided by students from Utah State University, and a classified U.S. Air Force payload. A secret mission control center in Sunnyvale, California participated in monitoring the flight. Mattingly, an active-duty naval officer, later described the classified payload – two sensors for detecting missile launches – as a "rinky-dink collection of minor stuff they wanted to fly". The payload failed to operate. The National Reconnaissance Office intended to fly DAMON, a secret payload intended to replace KH-9 HEXAGON, but it was canceled in December 1980.

In the shuttle's mid-deck, a Continuous Flow Electrophoresis System and the Mono-disperse Latex Reactor flew for the second time. The crew conducted a lightning survey with hand-held cameras, and performed medical experiments on themselves for two student projects. They also operated the Remote Manipulator System (Canadarm) with an instrument called the Induced Environment Contamination Monitor mounted on its end, designed to obtain information on gases or particles being released by the orbiter in flight.

Columbia landed on July 4, 1982, at 16:09:31 UTC, on the 15,000 ft (4.6 km) concrete runway 22 at Edwards Air Force Base, the first orbital Shuttle landing on a concrete runway. This time the lead escorting T-38 "Chase 1" was piloted by Guy Gardner with crewmate Jerry L. Ross. President Ronald Reagan and his wife Nancy Reagan greeted the crew upon arrival. Following the landing, President Reagan gave a speech to the crowd gathered at Edwards, during which he declared the Space Shuttle operational. He was followed by remarks from Mattingly and Hartsfield and a flyover of the new shuttle Challenger atop the Shuttle Carrier Aircraft (SCA), headed for KSC.

The flight lasted 7 days, 1 hour, 9 minutes, and 31 seconds, and covered a total distance of 4,700,000 km (2,900,000 mi) in 112 complete orbits. The mission achieved all objectives except for the Air Force payload, but the SRBs were lost when their main parachutes failed, causing the empty casings to impact the ocean at high velocity and sink. This and STS-51-L were the only missions where the SRBs were not recovered. Columbia returned to KSC on July 15, 1982.

== Gallery ==
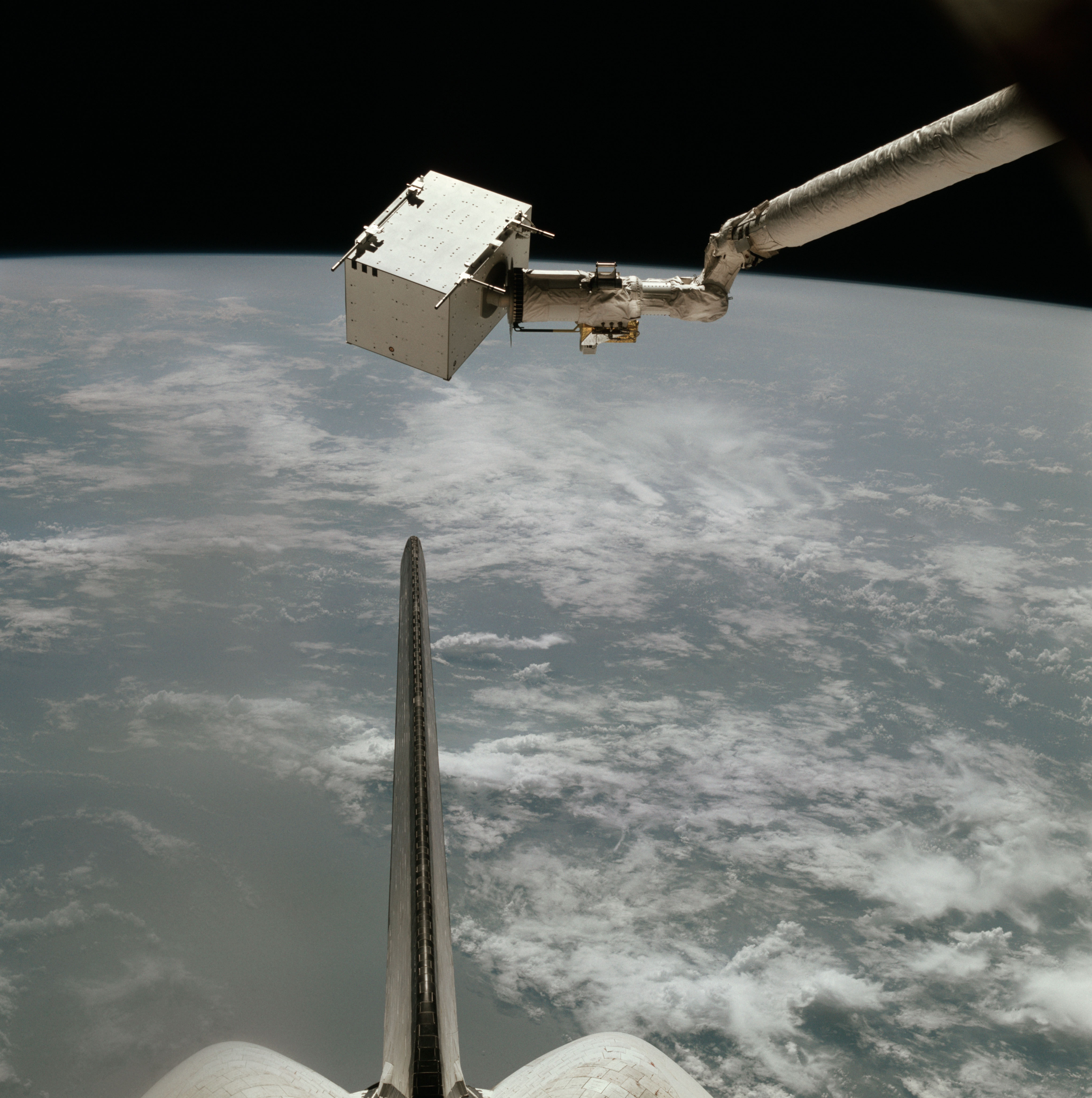
The Induced Environment Contaminant Monitor (IECM) is grappled by the Canadarm.

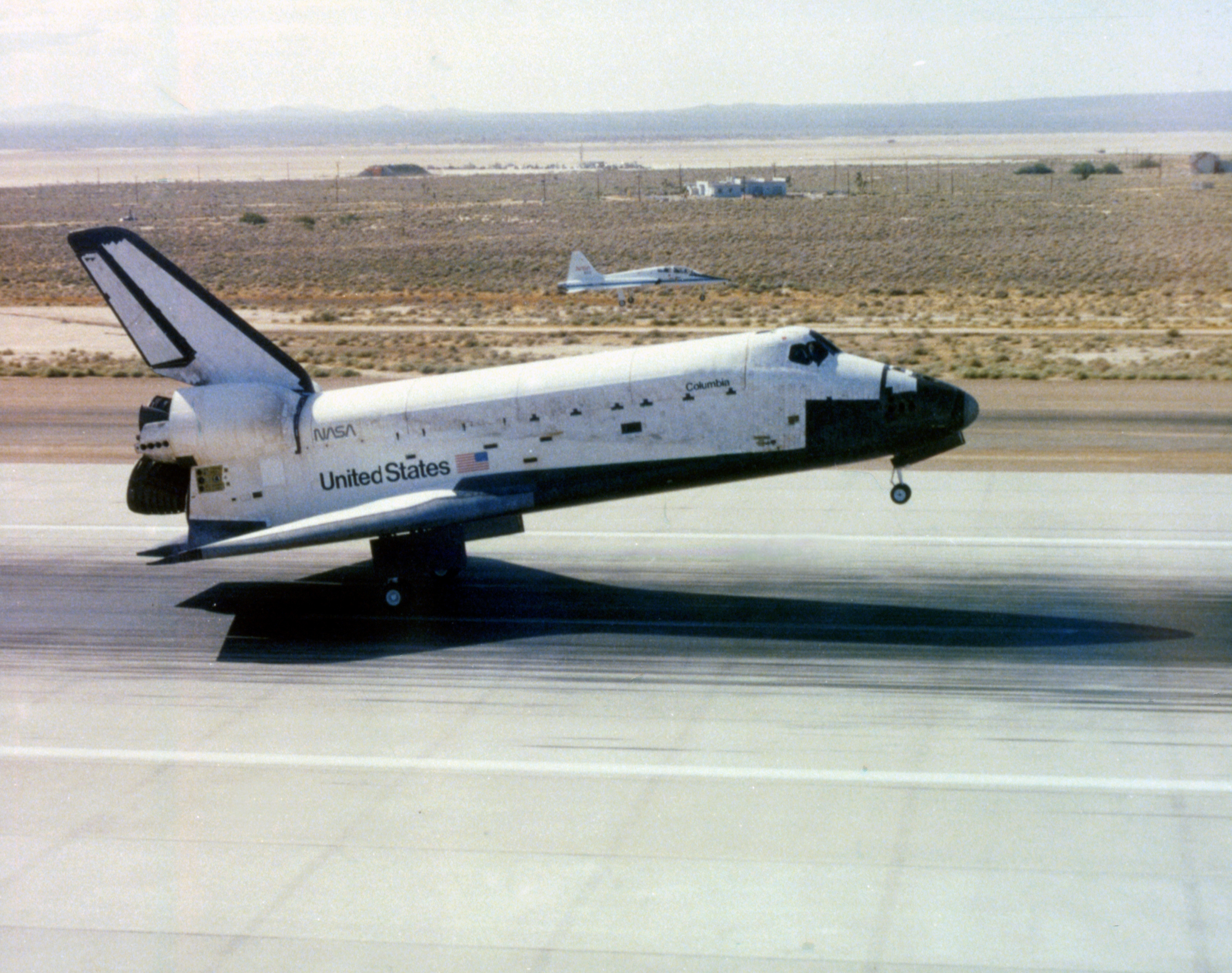
Space Shuttle Columbia lands at Edwards Air Force Base runway 22.

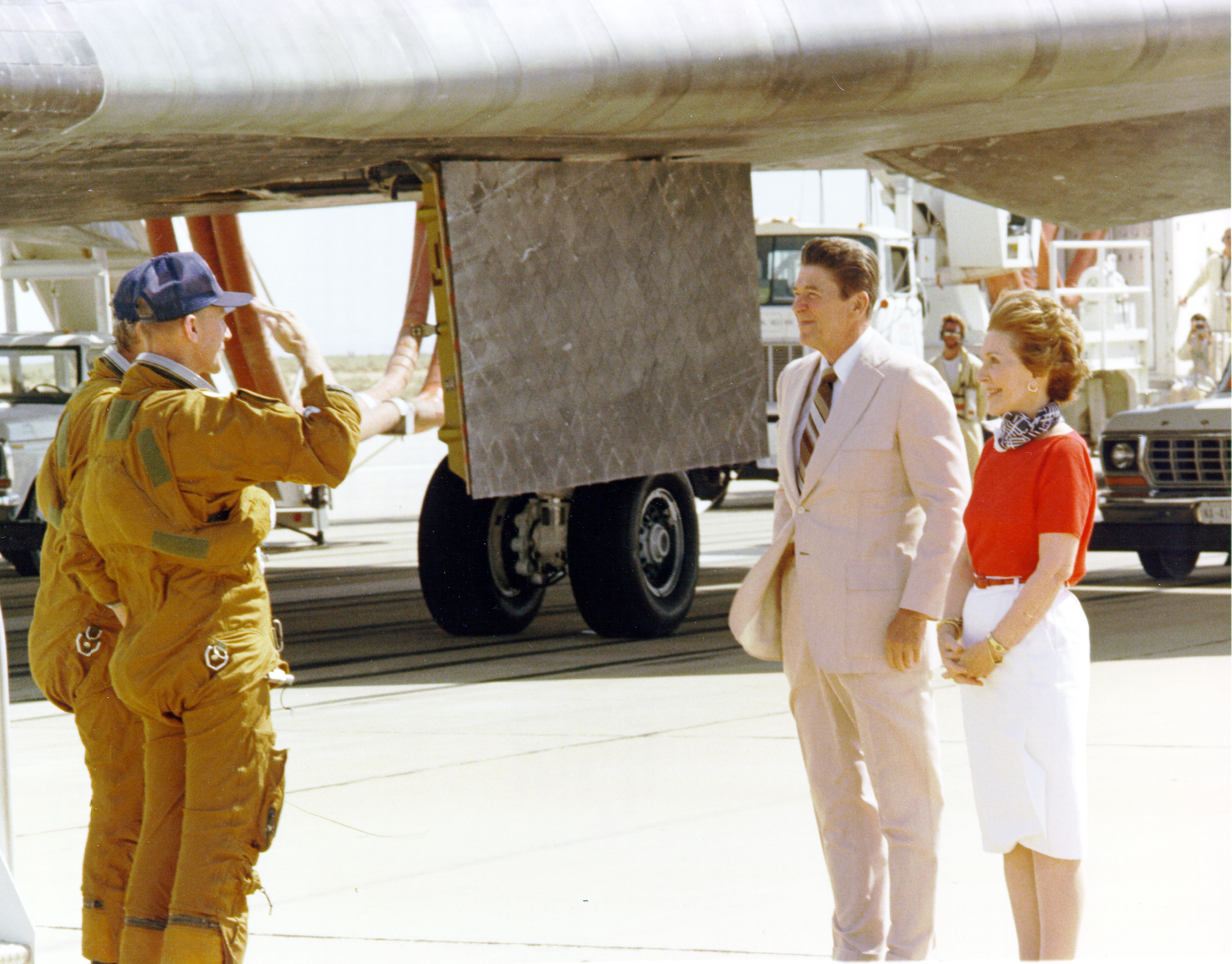
Henry Hartsfield and Ken Mattingly salute the Reagans after landing.

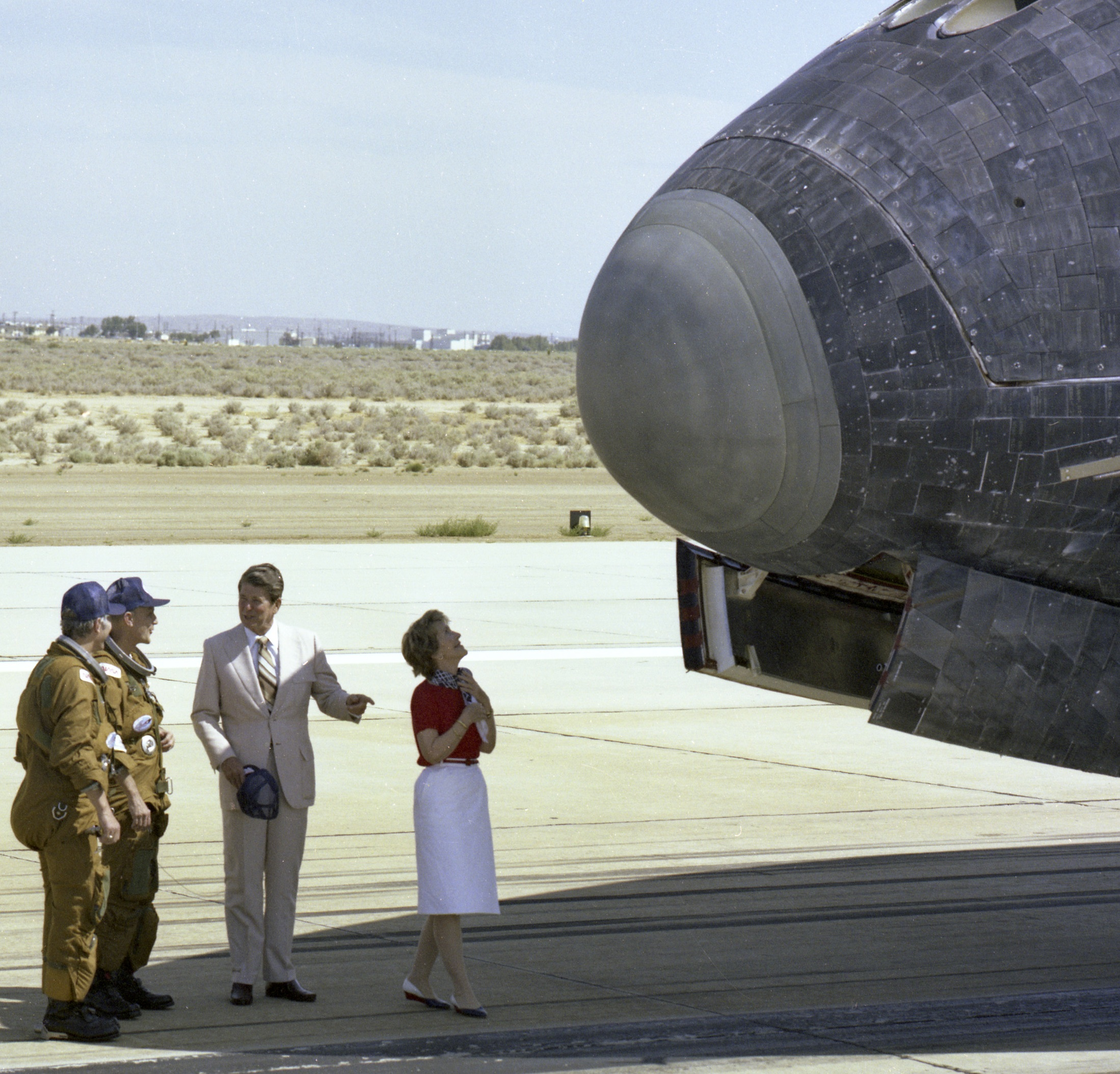
President Reagan and his wife Nancy observe the shuttle's forward tiles and nosecone.

== Mission insignia ==
The path of the red, white, and blue streak on the mission patch forms the numeral "4", indicating the flight's numerical designation in the Space Transportation System's mission sequence.

== Wake-up calls ==
NASA began a tradition of playing music to astronauts during the Project Gemini, and first used music to wake up a flight crew during Apollo 15. Each track is specially chosen, often by the astronauts' families, and usually has a special meaning to an individual member of the crew, or is applicable to their daily activities.

Flight Day	Song	Artist/Composer
Day 2	"Up, Up and Away"	The 5th Dimension
Day 3	"Hold That Tiger"	Auburn University Band
Day 4	Taped message for Hank Hartsfield on his wedding anniversary	
Day 5	"Theme from Chariots of Fire"	Vangelis
Day 6	Delta Tau Delta fraternity song (Mattingly), Delta Chi fraternity song (Hartsfield)	
Day 7	"This Is My Country"	Don Raye

== See also ==
- List of human spaceflights
- List of Space Shuttle missions
