= Canceled Space Shuttle missions =

Canceled space missions

During NASA's Space Shuttle program, several missions were canceled. Many were canceled as a result of the Challenger and the Columbia disasters or due to delays in the development of the shuttle. Others were canceled because of changes in payload and mission requirements.

== Canceled due to the late development of the Space Shuttle ==
In 1972, NASA's planners had projected 570 Space Shuttle missions between 1980 and 1991. Later, this estimate was lowered to 487 launches between 1980 and 1992. The details of the first 23 projected missions, listed in the third edition of Manned Spaceflight (Reginald Turnill, 1978) and the first edition of the STS Flight Assignment Baseline, an internal NASA document published in October 1977, are:

Mission	Original launch date(s)	Shuttle	Landing site	Mission details
STS-1A OFT-1	June 1979	Columbia	Edwards	Originally scheduled as the first orbital test. The crew was to consist of a commander and pilot, and the test flight was to last 2 days and 5 hours. The crew was not named at the initial announcement, but John W. Young and Robert L. Crippen were announced as the STS-1 crew in March 1978, when the shuttle was still scheduled for a 1979 launch.
STS-2A OFT-2	July 1979; 6 March 1980	Columbia	Edwards	Originally scheduled as the third orbital flight test, then the second flight. The five-day mission was to have Fred Haise and Jack R. Lousma take the Teleoperator Retrieval System (TRS) to the Skylab space station and boost it into a higher orbit. Vance D. Brand and C. Gordon Fullerton were their backups. By April 1979, when it was understood that the Shuttle could not be launched in time to rendezvous with Skylab, STS-2 was rescheduled for a 6 March 1980 launch, carrying the OSTA-1 payload and the Remote Manipulator System (RMS) for the first time. This re-manifested STS-2 launched on 12 November 1981, with Joe Engle and Richard H. Truly in place of Haise and Lousma, respectively.
STS-3 OFT-3	September 1979	Columbia	Edwards	Originally scheduled as the third orbital flight test. The 7-day mission was to see the two-man crew (commander and pilot) test shuttle maneuvering and remote manipulator systems.
STS-4 OFT-4	December 1979	Columbia	Edwards	Originally scheduled as the fourth orbital flight test. The crew was to consist of a commander and pilot, and the mission was to last seven days.
STS-5 OFT-5	February 1980	Columbia	Kennedy	Originally scheduled as the fifth orbital flight test. The crew was to consist of commander Ken Mattingly, pilot Henry W. Hartsfield Jr. and one or two mission specialists. The mission was to last 7 days. First landing at Kennedy Space Center.
STS-6 OFT-6	March 1980	Columbia	Edwards	Originally scheduled as the sixth orbital flight test. The crew of four were to conduct the first test of operational payloads and conduct the first EVA from the shuttle. The mission was to last seven days.
STS-7	30 May 1980; 27 February 1981	Columbia	Kennedy	First operational flight. The crew of three were to place the Long Duration Exposure Facility (LDEF) satellite into orbit and the mission was to last five days. The LDEF was eventually released in 1984 from Challenger during STS-41C. By 1979, when it became clear that the original launch schedule could not be kept, STS-7 was re-manifested with the TDRS-A satellite and scheduled to launch on 27 February 1981 with a crew of four and a duration of two days. This rescheduled STS-7 would also have landed at Kennedy Space Center.
STS-8	1 July 1980	Columbia	Edwards	The crew of three were to place the satellites TDRS-A and SBS-A into orbit during the 2-day mission. TDRS-A was sent into orbit on Challenger's maiden flight, STS-6, in April 1983.
STS-9	1 August 1980	Columbia	Edwards	The crew of three were to place the satellites GOES 4 and Anik-C1 into orbit during the 3-day mission. GOES 4 was launched atop a Delta 3914 a month after its originally scheduled launch on the shuttle. After this mission, Columbia would be returned to the Rockwell International plant at Palmdale, California for removal of the ejection seats and test instrumentation and would receive higher capacity fuel cells in preparation for the first Spacelab mission.
STS-10	14 November 1980	Columbia	Edwards	Originally scheduled for launch in 1980. The crew of three were to place the satellites TDRS-B and SBS-B into orbit during the 3-day mission. TDRS-B was rescheduled for STS-51E but became re-manifested on STS-51L, where it was destroyed along with Challenger on 28 January 1986.
STS-11	18 December 1980	Columbia	Edwards	Scheduled to carry the European Spacelab-1 science module. The crew of five were to consist of three NASA astronauts and two European payload specialists. The mission was to last seven days. This first Spacelab mission was later launched as STS-9 in November 1983.
STS-12	30 January 1981	Columbia	Edwards	The crew of three were to place the satellites TDRS-C and Anik-C2 into orbit during the 2-day mission. An alternate mission was also planned which replaced the TDRS-C with an Intelsat-V satellite, and would last five days instead of two. TDRS-C was eventually made as the replacement for the destroyed TDRS-B and launched from Discovery on STS-26 in September 1988.
STS-13	3 March 1981	Columbia	Edwards	The crew of three were to place the GOES-E satellite into orbit during the 5-day mission. GOES-E was eventually launched on a Delta 3914 over two months after its originally scheduled launch on the shuttle.
STS-14	7 April 1981	Columbia	Edwards	Scheduled to carry four Spacelab instrumentation pallets and a pressurized "igloo" used to support the payloads. The crew of five was to consist of two payload specialists. The mission was to last 12 days.
STS-15	13 May 1981	Columbia	Edwards	During this mission, the satellites TDRS-D and SBS-C would be placed into orbit. The Anik-C3 satellite could be substituted in place of SBS-C. TDRS-D was launched from Discovery on STS-29 in March 1989, with SBS-C being launched on Columbia's first operational mission, STS-5, in November 1982.
STS-16	16 June 1981	Columbia	Edwards	Originally scheduled for launch on 16 June 1981, carrying the Spacelab-3 science module. A "payload of opportunity" of 9 tons (8.16 mt) could accommodate a communications satellite. The crew of five was to include two payload specialists.
STS-17	16 July 1981	Enterprise	Edwards	Originally expected as the first spaceflight of the shuttle Enterprise, it was to place an Intelsat V satellite into orbit and retrieve the LDEF. Enterprise never launched, and instead its place as the second shuttle in the fleet was taken by Challenger.
STS-18	29 July 1981	Columbia	Edwards	Scheduled to carry a Spacelab pallet and pressurized "igloo". A military payload was planned for the Department of Defense, which would make it the first one flown on the Shuttle.
STS-19	2 September 1981	Columbia	Edwards	Was to carry a series of five Spacelab pallets.
STS-20	30 September 1981	Enterprise	Edwards	Originally scheduled for launch on 30 September 1981, carrying the Spacelab-4 life-science module and an unpressurized Spacelab pallet.
STS-21	14 October 1981	Columbia	Edwards	A crew of three was to retrieve the Solar Maximum Mission satellite and bring it back to Earth after a five-day mission. Columbia would have carried an "OMS Kit" which contained additional fuel for the shuttle's Orbital Maneuvering System, necessary to safely reach the SMM's orbit. The SMM, launched in February 1980, was eventually retrieved and repaired in orbit on STS-41-C in 1984, and continued operating until 1989.
STS-22	25 November 1981	Enterprise	Edwards	Was intended to carry an ESA-operated Spacelab module and additional pallet.
STS-23	5 January 1982	Columbia	Edwards	Was to launch the Galileo probe (then named the "Jupiter Orbiter and Probe") to Jupiter using a modified IUS booster. Galileo was eventually delivered to orbit by Atlantis during STS-34, launched 18 October 1989, after lengthy delays.

Later in the development process, NASA suggested using the first crewed Space Shuttle mission, STS-1, as a sub-orbital test of the Return to Launch Site (RTLS) flight profile devised for an emergency abort. Columbia would have launched from Kennedy Space Center, then executed a 180-degree turn at a speed of 8,400 kilometres per hour (5,200 mph), or 6.7 times the speed of sound, in order to land at the Kennedy Space Center runway. The mission was canceled when astronauts refused to fly it, having deemed the plan to be too dangerous. STS-1 commander John W. Young recalled that "I said no. I said let's not practice Russian roulette, because you may have a loaded gun there. So we didn't."

== Canceled between the first flight of the Space Shuttle (1981) and the Challenger disaster (1986) ==
Mission	Original launch date(s)	Shuttle	Crew	Mission details
STS-10	November 1983	Challenger	Thomas K. Mattingly II (Commander); Loren J. Shriver (Pilot); Ellison S. Onizuka (Mission Specialist); James F. Buchli (Mission Specialist); Gary E. Payton (Payload Specialist)	Originally to be the first classified mission for the Department of Defense; canceled due to concerns with the payload's Inertial Upper Stage booster. The entire crew, which had been assigned in October 1982, flew on STS-51-C in January 1985.
STS-12	March 1984	Discovery	Henry W. Hartsfield Jr. (Commander); Michael L. Coats (Pilot); Richard M. Mullane (Mission Specialist); Steven A. Hawley (Mission Specialist); Judith A. Resnik (Mission Specialist)	Originally to be the maiden flight of Discovery. Its original mission was to deploy a TDRS satellite, which was canceled due to concerns with the Inertial Upper Stage (IUS) that was to be used in the mission. The crew (along with payload specialist Charles D. Walker) eventually flew on STS-41-D in August 1984.
STS-41-E	July 1984	Challenger	Thomas K. Mattingly II (Commander); Loren J. Shriver (Pilot); Ellison S. Onizuka (Mission Specialist); James F. Buchli (Mission Specialist); Jeffrey E. Detroye (Payload Specialist)	A mission to deploy a DOD satellite; was canceled due to problems with the IUS upper stage that was to be used in the mission.
STS-41-F	29 August 1984	Discovery	Karol J. Bobko (Commander); Donald E. Williams (Pilot); M. Rhea Seddon (Mission Specialist); S. David Griggs (Mission Specialist); Jeffrey A. Hoffman (Mission Specialist)	Canceled after STS-41-D was delayed due to its RSLS abort. Most of STS-41-F's payloads were added to the STS-41-D mission and eventually launched in August 1984. STS-41-F was scheduled to launch at 13:35 UTC on 29 August 1984, and land on Runway 17 at Edwards Air Force Base at 11:32 UTC on 4 September.
STS-51-E	March 1985	Challenger	(United States) Karol J. Bobko (Commander); (United States) Donald E. Williams (Pilot); (United States) M. Rhea Seddon (Mission Specialist); (United States) S. David Griggs (Mission Specialist); (United States) Jeffrey A. Hoffman (Mission Specialist); (France) Patrick Baudry (Payload Specialist); (United States) Edwin J. Garn (Payload Specialist)	Mission objective was to deploy the TDRS-B communication satellite, canceled due to IUS failure. Most of the crew would be reassigned to STS-51-D which flew in April 1985 (except for Patrick Baudry, who was reassigned to STS-51-G which flew in June 1985).
STS-51-D	March 1985	Discovery	Daniel C. Brandenstein (Commander); John O. Creighton (Pilot); Steven R. Nagel (Mission Specialist); John M. Fabian (Mission Specialist); Shannon W. Lucid (Mission Specialist); Gregory B. Jarvis (Payload Specialist); Charles D. Walker (Payload Specialist)	Mission objectives were to deploy a Syncom communication satellite and retrieval of the Long Duration Exposure Facility. Most of the crew would fly on STS-51-G in June, with Walker remaining on the remanifested STS-51-D flight and Jarvis eventually bumped to STS-51-L, in which he was killed during the Challenger disaster.
STS-51-H	November 1985	Atlantis	(United States) Vance D. Brand (Commander); (United States) Michael J. Smith (Pilot); (United States) Robert C. Springer (Mission Specialist); (United States) Owen K. Garriott (Mission Specialist); (Switzerland) Claude Nicollier (Mission Specialist); (United States) Michael Lampton (Payload Specialist); (United States) Byron K. Lichtenberg (Payload Specialist)	Originally EOM-1 Spacelab mission, canceled in December 1984 due to planned combining with EOM-2 mission. Later re-manifested as STS-61-K which was then canceled due to the Challenger disaster and Smith was eventually reassigned to STS-51-L, in which he was killed during the aforementioned Challenger disaster.

== Canceled due to the Challenger disaster ==
Mission	Original launch date(s)	Shuttle	Crew	Mission details
STS-61-E	6 March 1986	Columbia	Jon A. McBride (Commander); Richard N. Richards (Pilot); David C. Leestma (Mission Specialist); Jeffrey A. Hoffman (Mission Specialist); Robert A. Parker (Mission Specialist); Samuel T. Durrance (Payload Specialist); Ronald A. Parise (Payload Specialist); Backup Payload Specialist: Kenneth Hugh Nordsieck	ASTRO-1 mission, would have been used to examine Halley's Comet in conjunction with the uncrewed probes of the Halley Armada. The ASTRO-1 mission, and most of the assigned crew (except for Richards and Leestma, who were reassigned to STS-28 in 1989), would eventually fly on STS-35 in 1990; Vance D. Brand replaced McBride, who left NASA in 1989.
STS-61-F	15 May 1986	Challenger	Frederick H. Hauck (Commander); Roy D. Bridges (Pilot); David C. Hilmers (Mission Specialist); John M. Lounge (Mission Specialist)	Primary mission intended to deploy the Ulysses solar polar orbiter with a Centaur-G upper stage. Most of the crew would fly on the first post-Challenger shuttle mission, STS-26 in 1988, later be flown by Discovery; Richard O. Covey replaced Bridges, who left NASA shortly after the Challenger disaster. Ulysses itself would eventually be launched by Discovery on STS-41 with an IUS.
STS-61-G	20 May 1986	Atlantis	David M. Walker (Commander); Ronald J. Grabe (Pilot); Norman E. Thagard (Mission Specialist); James D. A. van Hoften (Mission Specialist)	Primary mission would have been the deployment of the Galileo probe with a Centaur-G upper stage. Most of the crew would later fly on STS-30 in 1989 with Mary L. Cleave replaced van Hoften, who retired from NASA in 1986. Galileo would eventually be launched by Atlantis on STS-34 with an IUS.
STS-61-H	24 June 1986	Columbia	(United States) Michael L. Coats (Commander); (United States) John E. Blaha (Pilot); (United States) Robert C. Springer (Mission Specialist); (United States) Anna L. Fisher (Mission Specialist); (United States) James F. Buchli (Mission Specialist); (Indonesia) Pratiwi Sudarmono (Payload Specialist); (United Kingdom) Nigel Wood (Payload Specialist); Backup Payload Specialists: (Indonesia) Taufik Akbar; (United Kingdom) Richard Farrimond	Mission objective was to deploy three satellites. The crew would have included the first British and the first Indonesian astronaut. Most of this crew would fly without Fisher and payload specialists as STS-29; James P. Bagian replaced Fisher, who was on leave.
STS-62-A	1 July 1986	Discovery	Robert L. Crippen (Commander); Guy S. Gardner (Pilot); Richard M. Mullane (Mission Specialist); Jerry L. Ross (Mission Specialist); Dale A. Gardner (Mission Specialist); Edward C. Aldridge Jr. (Payload Specialist); Brett Watterson (Payload Specialist)	DOD mission, was to have been the first shuttle mission flown from Space Launch Complex 6 at Vandenberg Air Force Base, and would have been the first shuttle to launch into a polar orbit. Gardner, Mullane, and Ross would fly together on STS-27, commanded by Robert L. Gibson, and with William Shepherd rounding out the crew, with no payload specialists.
STS-61-M	22 July 1986	Challenger	Loren J. Shriver (Commander); Bryan D. O'Connor (Pilot); Mark C. Lee (Mission Specialist); Sally K. Ride (Mission Specialist); William F. Fisher (Mission Specialist); Robert Wood (Payload Specialist); Backup Payload Specialist: Charles D. Walker	Payload was to have been the TDRS-4 satellite, which was eventually launched aboard STS-29 in March 1989. Shriver, O'Connor, and Lee were reassigned to STS-31, STS-40, and STS-30 in 1990, 1991, and 1989, respectively. Ride would have named as a member in the Rogers Commission Report, which investigated the Challenger disaster.
STS-61-J	18 August 1986	Atlantis	John W. Young (Commander); Charles F. Bolden Jr. (Pilot); Bruce McCandless II (Mission Specialist); Steven A. Hawley (Mission Specialist); Kathryn D. Sullivan (Mission Specialist)	The STS-61-J mission was intended to deploy the Hubble Space Telescope into orbit. The telescope was eventually launched on STS-31 in 1990, with the same crew on board (except Young, who was replaced by Loren Shriver).
STS-61-N	4 September 1986	Discovery	Brewster H. Shaw Jr. (Commander); Michael J. McCulley (Pilot); David C. Leestma (Mission Specialist); Mark N. Brown (Mission Specialist); James C. Adamson (Mission Specialist); Frank J. Casserino (Payload Specialist) (MSE); Lawrence A. Skantze (Payload Specialist); Backup Payload Specialist: Daryl Joseph	DOD mission, which would be flown in 1989 as STS-28 with most of the named crew except McCulley (who was replaced by Richard N. Richards) and Casserino. McCulley was eventually reassigned to STS-34 in 1989.
STS-61-I	27 September 1986	Challenger	(United States) Donald E. Williams (Commander); (United States) Michael J. Smith (Pilot); (United States) James P. Bagian (Mission Specialist); (United States) Bonnie J. Dunbar (Mission Specialist); (United States) Manley L. Carter Jr. (Mission Specialist); (India) Nagapathi C. Bhat (Payload Specialist); Backup Payload Specialist: (India) P. Radhakrishnan	Primary mission objective would have been deployment of the Intelsat-4 satellite and the retrieval of the Long Duration Exposure Facility. This crew would have included the first Indian astronaut launched aboard an US rocket. Smith perished in the Challenger disaster shortly after being named to this crew. Dunbar would later be assigned to STS-32, which retrieved the LDEF in 1990. Williams, Bagian, and Carter would later be reassigned to STS-34, STS-29, and STS-33 in 1989, respectively.
STS-62-B	29 September 1986	Discovery	Katherine Eileen Sparks Roberts (Payload Specialist)	DOD mission. Only one crew member was assigned to the mission before it was canceled.
STS-61-K	1 October 1986	Columbia	(United States) Vance D. Brand (Commander); (United States) S. David Griggs (Pilot); (United States) Robert L. Stewart (Mission Specialist); (United States) Owen K. Garriott (Mission Specialist); (Switzerland) Claude Nicollier (Mission Specialist); (United States) Byron K. Lichtenberg (Payload Specialist); (United States) Michael Lampton (Payload Specialist); (United States) Robert E. Stevenson (Payload Specialist); Backup Payload Specialists: (Belgium) Dirk Frimout; (United States) Charles R. Chappell	A Spacelab mission combining EOM-1 (initially planned under the cancelled STS-51-H) and EOM-2. EOM (Earth Observing Mission) was later replaced by the ATLAS (Atmospheric Laboratory for Applications and Science) program. Lichtenberg subsequently flew aboard STS-45 (ATLAS-1). Lampton was originally assigned to STS-45, but was replaced by his back-up Dirk Frimout owing to medical issues. Nicollier later flew on four Shuttle missions. Griggs was reassigned to STS-33 in 1989 as a pilot but was killed in a plane crash before he was set to be flown and was replaced by John E. Blaha. Brand was then reassigned to STS-35 in 1990.
STS-61-L	1 November 1986	Atlantis	John Konrad (Payload Specialist); Backup Payload Specialist: Stephen Cunningham	Would have launched the first journalist in space. Only one crewmember was assigned to the mission before it was canceled.
STS-71-B	December 1986	Challenger	Charles Edward Jones (Military Spaceflight Engineer)	DOD mission. The only scheduled crew member was Charles Edward Jones, who later died on Flight 11 when it was crashed into the World Trade Center during the September 11, 2001 attacks.
STS-71-A	January 1987	Columbia	Kenneth Hugh Nordsieck (Payload Specialist)	Astro-2 mission.
STS-71-C	January 1987	Atlantis	(United Kingdom) Peter Longhurst (Payload Specialist); Backup Payload Specialist: (United Kingdom) Christopher Holmes	Was to launch a British Skynet satellite. Only one crew member, a British astronaut, was assigned to the mission before it was canceled.
STS-71-D	February 1987	Columbia	Robert Jackson Wood (Payload Specialist); Backup Payload Specialist: Charles D. Walker	Would have carried a McDonnell Douglas payload.
STS-71-E	March 1987	Challenger	Drew Gaffney (Payload Specialist); Robert Ward Phillips (Payload Specialist); Backup Payload Specialist: Millie Hughes-Fulford	First Spacelab Life Science mission (SLS-1).
STS-71-F	March 1987	Atlantis	(Canada) Steven MacLean (Payload Specialist); Backup Payload Specialist: (Canada) Bjarni Tryggvason	MacLean would later be assigned to fly at STS-52 in 1992.
STS-71-G	April 1987	Challenger		Was to launch a Navstar GPS satellite.
STS-71-J	June 1987	Challenger		Was to deploy a second LDEF with new experiments.
STS-71-M	August 1987	Columbia	Kenneth Hugh Nordsieck (Payload Specialist)	ASTRO-3 mission.
STS-71-N	September 1987	Atlantis		Was to launch the first element of the Space Station Freedom into orbit.
STS-81-A	October 1987	Challenger		Was to launch a Navstar GPS satellite.
STS-81-D	December 1987	Challenger		Was to launch a Navstar GPS satellite.
STS-81-G	February 1988	Challenger	(Japan) Mamoru Mohri (Payload Specialist); (Japan) Chiaki Mukai (Payload Specialist); Backup Payload Specialist: (Japan) Takao Doi	Planned Spacelab-J science mission. The two Japanese astronauts who would serve as payload specialists were the only ones assigned to the mission before it was canceled. Spacelab-J was eventually flown on STS-47 in 1992, using Challenger's replacement, Endeavour. Mukai would go on to fly at STS-65 in 1994.
STS-81-I	April 1988	Atlantis		
STS-81-M	July 1988	Atlantis	Millie Hughes-Fulford (Payload Specialist)	Second Spacelab Life Science mission (SLS-2). The only crewmember assigned to the mission, Millie Hughes-Fulford, would ultimately fly on STS-40.
STS-82-B	1988	Discovery		Among other tasks, the mission included the deployment of the Cosmic Background Explorer observatory, later launched on a Delta rocket in 1989.

== Canceled due to the Columbia disaster ==
Mission	Original launch date(s)	Shuttle	Crew	Mission details
STS-114	1 March 2003	Atlantis	(United States) Eileen Collins (Commander); (United States) Jim Kelly (Pilot); (Japan) Soichi Noguchi, JAXA (Mission Specialist 1); (United States) Stephen Robinson (Mission Specialist 2); (Russia) Yuri Malenchenko, RKA (Launching only, incoming ISS Commander for Expedition 7); (United States) Ken Bowersox (Landing only, outgoing ISS Commander for Expedition 6); (United States) Ed Lu (Launching only, incoming ISS Flight Engineer for Expedition 7); (Russia) Nikolai Budarin, RKA (Landing only, outgoing ISS Flight Engineer for Expedition 6); (Russia) Aleksandr Kaleri, RKA (Launching only, incoming ISS Flight Engineer for Expedition 7); (United States) Donald Pettit (Landing only, outgoing ISS Flight Engineer for Expedition 6)	ISS mission. It would have carried the Multi-Purpose Logistics Module Raffaello and carried out a station crew rotation. A similar crew conducted a different mission on Discovery in 2005.
STS-115	23 May 2003	Endeavour	(United States) Brent W. Jett Jr. (Commander); (United States) Chris Ferguson (Pilot); (Canada) Steven G. MacLean, CSA (Mission Specialist 1); (United States) Daniel C. Burbank (Mission Specialist 2); (United States) Joseph R. Tanner (Mission Specialist 3); (United States) Heidemarie M. Stefanyshyn-Piper (Mission Specialist 4)	Assembly mission to the International Space Station, which was ultimately launched with the same crew on Atlantis in 2006.
STS-116	24 July 2003	Atlantis	(United States) Terry Wilcutt (Commander); (United States) William Oefelein (Pilot); (Sweden) Christer Fuglesang, ESA (Mission Specialist 1); (United States) Robert Curbeam (Mission Specialist 2); (United States) Michael Foale (Launching only, incoming ISS Commander, Expedition 8); (Russia) Yuri I. Malenchenko, RKA (Landing only, outgoing ISS Commander, Expedition 7); (United States) Bill McArthur (Launching only, incoming ISS Flight Engineer, Expedition 8); (United States) Ed Lu (Landing only, outgoing ISS Flight Engineer, Expedition 7); (Russia) Valery Tokarev, RKA (Launching only, incoming ISS Flight Engineer, Expedition 8); (Russia) Aleksandr Kaleri (Landing only, outgoing ISS Flight Engineer, Expedition 7)	Assembly mission to the International Space Station, delivering the third port truss segment (ITS P5), logistics and supplies. This mission launched with some of the same crew members on Discovery in 2006. It would also have carried out a station crew rotation.
STS-117	2 October 2003	Endeavour	Frederick W. Sturckow (Commander); Mark L. Polansky (Pilot); James F. Reilly II (Mission Specialist 1); Patrick G. Forrester (Mission Specialist 2); Richard A. Mastracchio (Mission Specialist 3); Joan Higginbotham (Mission Specialist 4)	Assembly mission to the International Space Station to conduct ISS-13A, delivering the second starboard truss segment (ITS S3/S4), a solar array set, and batteries. This mission launched with some of the same crew members on Atlantis in 2007.
STS-118	13 November 2003	Columbia	(United States) Scott J. Kelly (Commander); (United States) Charles O. Hobaugh (Pilot); (United States) Scott E. Parazynski (Mission Specialist 1); (Canada) Dafydd Williams, CSA (Mission Specialist 2); (United States) Lisa M. Nowak (Mission Specialist 3); (United States) Barbara R. Morgan (Mission Specialist 4)	Assembly mission to the International Space Station to conduct ISS-13A.1, delivering the third starboard truss segment (ITS S5) and station supplies. It would have been Columbia's first ISS visit. This mission launched with some of the same crew members on Endeavour in 2007.
STS-119	15 January 2004	Atlantis	(United States) Steven Lindsey (Commander); (United States) Mark Kelly (Pilot); (United States) Michael L. Gernhardt (Mission Specialist 1); (Peru) / (United States) Carlos I. Noriega (Mission Specialist 2); (Russia) Gennady Padalka, RKA (Launching only, incoming ISS Commander, Expedition 9); (United States) Michael Foale (Landing only, outgoing ISS Commander, Expedition 8); (United States) Michael Fincke (Launching only, incoming ISS Flight Engineer, Expedition 9); (United States) William S. McArthur (Landing only, outgoing ISS Flight Engineer, Expedition 8); (Russia) Oleg Kononenko, RKA (Launching only, incoming ISS Flight Engineer, Expedition 9); (Russia) Valery Tokarev, RKA (Landing only, outgoing ISS Flight Engineer, Expedition 8)	Assembly mission to the International Space Station to conduct ISS-15A and carry out a station crew rotation. This mission was conducted with a different crew on Discovery in 2009.
STS-120	19 February 2004	Endeavour	James D. Halsell (Commander); Alan G. Poindexter (Pilot); Wendy B. Lawrence (Mission Specialist 1); Stephanie D. Wilson (Mission Specialist 2); Piers J. Sellers (Mission Specialist 3); Michael J. Foreman (Mission Specialist 4)	Assembly mission to the International Space Station to conduct assembly mission ISS-10A, delivering the second of three station connecting modules, Harmony. With this mission, the ISS US Orbital Segment would have been completed. This mission was carried out with a different crew on Discovery in 2007. Only Stephanie Wilson would be retained on the crew.
STS-121	29 July 2004	Discovery		ISS-ULF2 mission. Would have carried a Multi-Purpose Logistics Module and a Lightweight Multi-Purpose Carrier, and conducted a crew rotation.
STS-122	7 October 2004	Atlantis		ISS-1E mission. Would have launched the Columbus module and carried an integrated cargo carrier.
STS-123	18 November 2004	Columbia		Fourth Hubble Space Telescope servicing mission, ultimately conducted by Atlantis on STS-125.
STS-124	13 January 2005	Discovery		Resupply mission ISS-UF3 to the International Space Station. Would have carried a Multi-Purpose Logistics Module and a Lightweight Multi-Purpose Carrier, and conducted a crew rotation.
STS-125	28 April 2005	Atlantis		Resupply mission ISS-UF4 to the International Space Station. mission. Would have carried the EDO pallet and the ICC-D1 cargo carrier.
STS-126	28 July 2005	Discovery		Resupply mission ISS-UF5 to the International Space Station. Would have carried a Multi-Purpose Logistics Module and a Lightweight Multi-Purpose Carrier, and conducted a crew rotation.
STS-127	28 October 2005	Atlantis		Resupply mission ISS-UF4.1 to the International Space Station. Would have carried Express Pallet-1.
STS-128	19 January 2006	Discovery		Resupply mission ISS-UF6 to the International Space Station. Would have carried a Multi-Purpose Logistics Module and a Lightweight Multi-Purpose Carrier, and conducted a crew rotation.
STS-129	30 March 2006	Endeavour		Assembly mission ISS-1J/A to the International Space Station, delivering the Japanese hardware ELM PS, carrying Express Pallet-2, and conducting a crew rotation.
STS-130	13 July 2006	Discovery		Assembly mission ISS-1J to the International Space Station, delivering the Japanese hardware JEM PM.
STS-131	5 October 2006	Endeavour		ISS-ULF3 mission. Would have carried a Multi-Purpose Logistics Module and a Lightweight Multi-Purpose Carrier, and conducted a crew rotation.
STS-132	18 January 2007	Discovery		Assembly mission ISS-9A.1 to the International Space Station. Would have delivered the MTsM and two solar arrays.
STS-133	12 April 2007	Endeavour		Resupply mission ISS-UF7 to the International Space Station. Would have delivered the Centrifuge Accommodations Module and conducted a crew rotation.
STS-134	28 June 2007	Discovery		Assembly mission ISS-2J/A to the International Space Station, delivering components of the Kibo module, among other hardware.
STS-135	1 November 2007	Endeavour		ISS-ULF5 mission. Would have carried a Multi-Purpose Logistics Module and a Lightweight Multi-Purpose Carrier, and conducted a crew rotation.
STS-136	17 January 2008	Atlantis		Assembly mission ISS-14A to the International Space Station, delivering the cupola and Express Pallet-3. Would have carried the EDO pallet.
STS-137	10 March 2008	Discovery		International Space Station crew rotation mission ISS-20A. Would have delivered Node 3.
STS-138	17 July 2008	Endeavour		International Space Station assembly mission ISS-16A. Would have delivered the US Habitation Module.
STS-139	2 October 2008	Atlantis		International Space Station crew rotation mission ISS-17A. Would have carried a Multi-Purpose Logistics Module.
STS-140	22 January 2009	Endeavour		International Space Station assembly mission ISS-18A. This mission was originally intended to deliver the first Crew Return Vehicle, prior to its cancellation.
STS-141	16 April 2009	Atlantis		International Space Station crew rotation mission ISS-19A. Would have carried a Multi-Purpose Logistics Module.
STS-142	23 July 2009	Endeavour		International Space Station mission.
STS-143	1 October 2009	Atlantis		International Space Station mission.
STS-144	19 November 2009	Columbia		Would have retrieved the Hubble Space Telescope and returned it to Earth.
STS-145	21 January 2010	Endeavour		International Space Station mission.
STS-146	8 April 2010	Discovery		International Space Station mission.
STS-147	1 July 2010	Atlantis		International Space Station mission.
