= STS-61-M =

Canceled Space Shuttle mission

- Names: Space Transportation System
- Mission type: TDRS-D satellite deployment (planned)
- Operator: NASA

Spacecraft properties
- Spacecraft: Space Shuttle Challenger (planned)

Crew
- Crew size: 6
- Members: Loren J. Shriver; Bryan D. O'Connor; Mark C. Lee; Sally K. Ride; William Frederick Fisher; Robert Wood

Start of mission
- Launch date: July 15, 1986 (planned); Not launched
- Rocket: Space Shuttle Challenger
- Launch site: Kennedy Space Center, LC-39A
- Contractor: Rockwell International

Orbital parameters
- Reference system: Geocentric orbit (planned)
- Regime: Low Earth orbit
- Perigee altitude: 285 km (177 mi)
- Apogee altitude: 295 km (183 mi)
- Inclination: 28.45°
- Period: 90.40 minutes
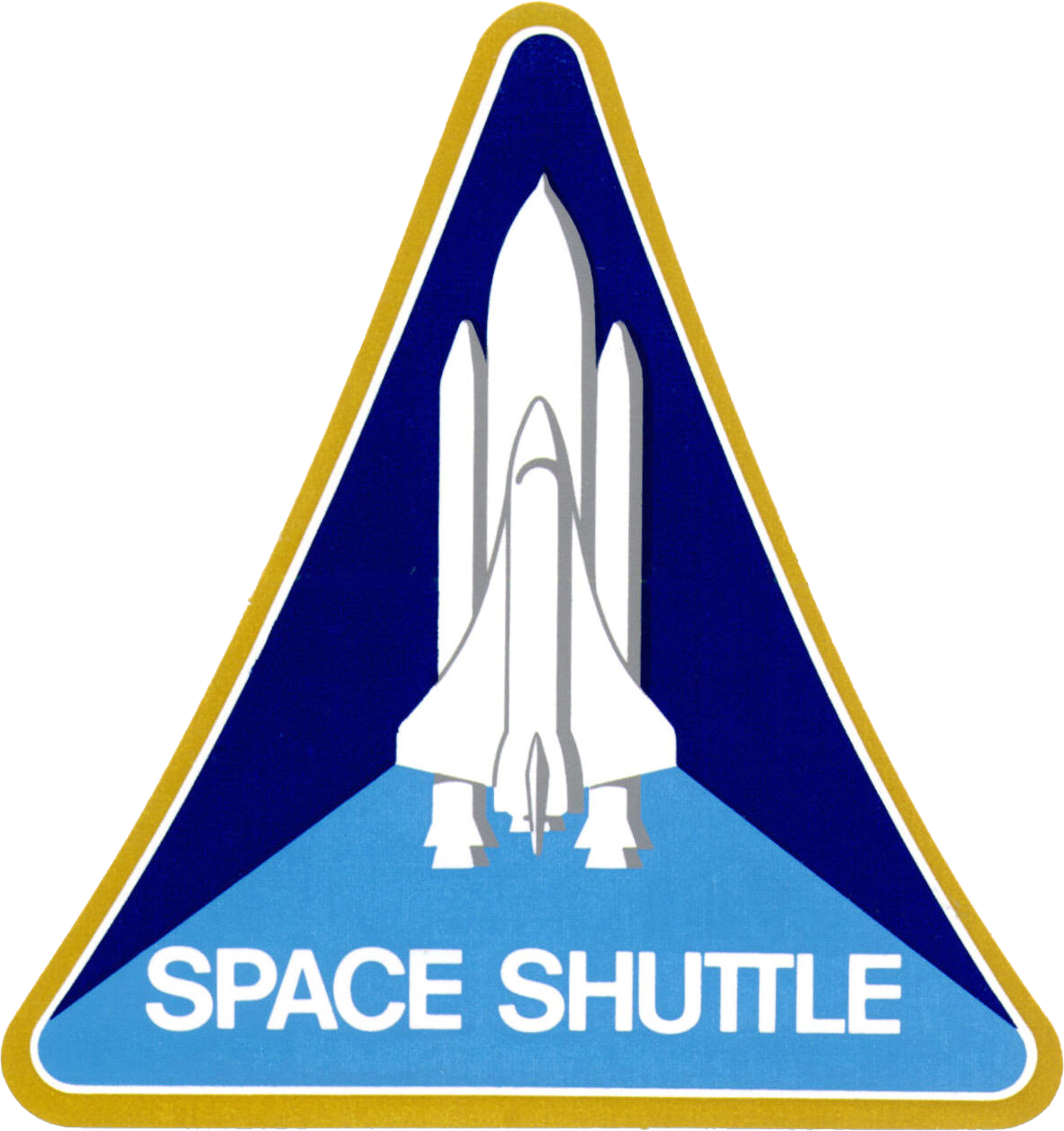
- Space Shuttle patch Space Shuttle program Cancelled Shuttle missions

STS-61-M was a proposed NASA Space Shuttle program mission, planned for July 1986 but canceled following the Space Shuttle Challenger disaster (STS-51-L).

The payload manifest was to have been TDRS-D, INSAT-1C, and EOS-1 (Electrophoresis Operations in Space). EOS-1 was a payload developed by McDonnell Douglas that would have demonstrated the production in space of ultra-pure erythropoietin through electrophoresis. Robert Wood, a McDonnell Douglas engineer, was assigned as the payload specialist for EOS-1 with fellow engineer Charles D. Walker assigned as his backup.

If flown, this would have been Sally Ride's third space mission. After the Challenger disaster, Ride was named to the Rogers Commission investigating the disaster and left NASA afterwards in 1987.

== Primary Crew ==
| Position | Astronaut |
|---|---|
| Commander | Loren J. Shriver; Would have been second space mission |
| Pilot | Bryan D. O'Connor; Would have been second space mission |
| Mission Specialist 1 | Mark C. Lee; Would have been first space mission |
| Mission Specialist 2 | Sally K. Ride; Would have been third space mission |
| Mission Specialist 3 | William F. Fisher; Would have been second space mission |
| Payload Specialist | Robert Wood; Would have been first space mission |

== Backup Crew ==
| Position | Astronaut |
|---|---|
| Payload Specialist | Charles D. Walker; Would have been fourth space mission |

== See also ==
- Canceled Space Shuttle missions
- STS-61-H
