= Charles Edward Jones =

American astronaut (1952–2001)

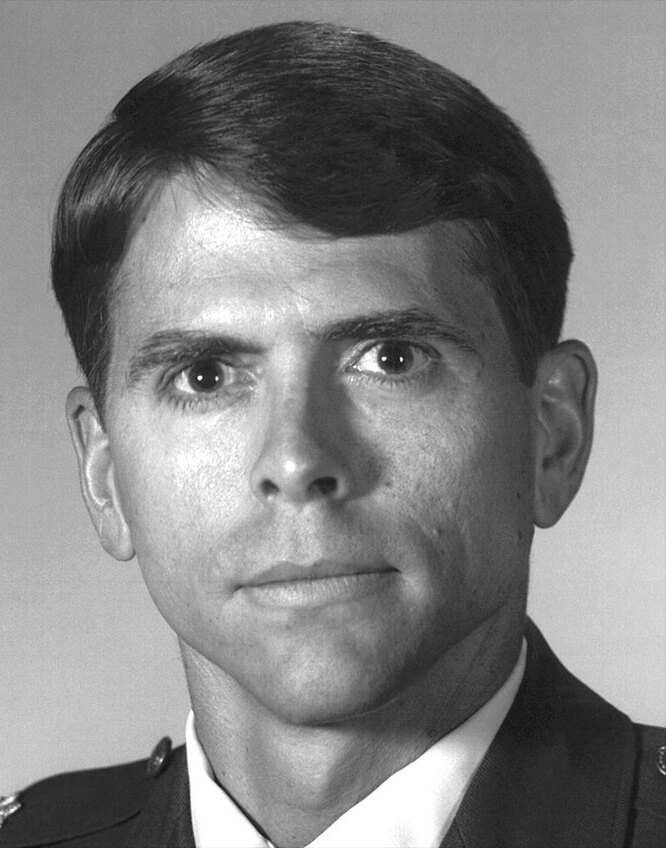
- Born: Charles Edward Jones; November 8, 1952; Clinton, Indiana, U.S.
- Died: September 11, 2001 (aged 48); New York City, New York, U.S.
- Cause of death: Plane crash as part of the September 11 attacks
- Education: United States Air Force Academy, B.S. 1974; Massachusetts Institute of Technology, M.S. 1980
- Space career

USAF astronaut
- Previous occupation: Computer programmer
- Rank: Colonel, USAF
- Selection: 1982 USAF Group
- Mission: Canceled Space Shuttle missions (STS-71-B)

Not be confused with John Edward Jones (Nutty Putty Cave)

Charles Edward Jones (November 8, 1952 – September 11, 2001) was a United States Air Force officer, an aeronautical engineer, computer programmer, and an astronaut in the USAF Manned Spaceflight Engineer Program. He was killed during the September 11 attacks, aboard American Airlines Flight 11.

== Life ==
Charles Edward Jones was born November 8, 1952, in Clinton, Indiana. He graduated from Wichita East High School in 1970, earned a Bachelor of Science degree in Astronautical Engineering from the United States Air Force Academy in 1974, and received a Master of Science degree in astronautics from Massachusetts Institute of Technology in 1980. He entered the USAF Manned Spaceflight Engineer Program in 1982, and was scheduled to fly on mission STS-71-B in December 1986, but the mission was canceled after the Challenger disaster in January 1986. He left the Manned Spaceflight Engineer program in 1987.

He later worked for Defense Intelligence Agency, Bolling Air Force Base in Washington, D.C., and was Systems Program Director for Intelligence and Information Systems, Hanscom Air Force Base, Massachusetts. Jones later was the manager of space programs for BAE Systems.

Jones was killed at the age of 48 in the attacks of September 11, 2001, aboard American Airlines Flight 11. Jones was flying that day on a routine business trip for BAE Systems, and had been living as a retired U.S. Air Force colonel in Bedford, Massachusetts, at the time of his death. His remains were never found. He was survived by his wife Jeanette.

At the National 9/11 Memorial, Jones is memorialized at the North Pool, on Panel N-74.

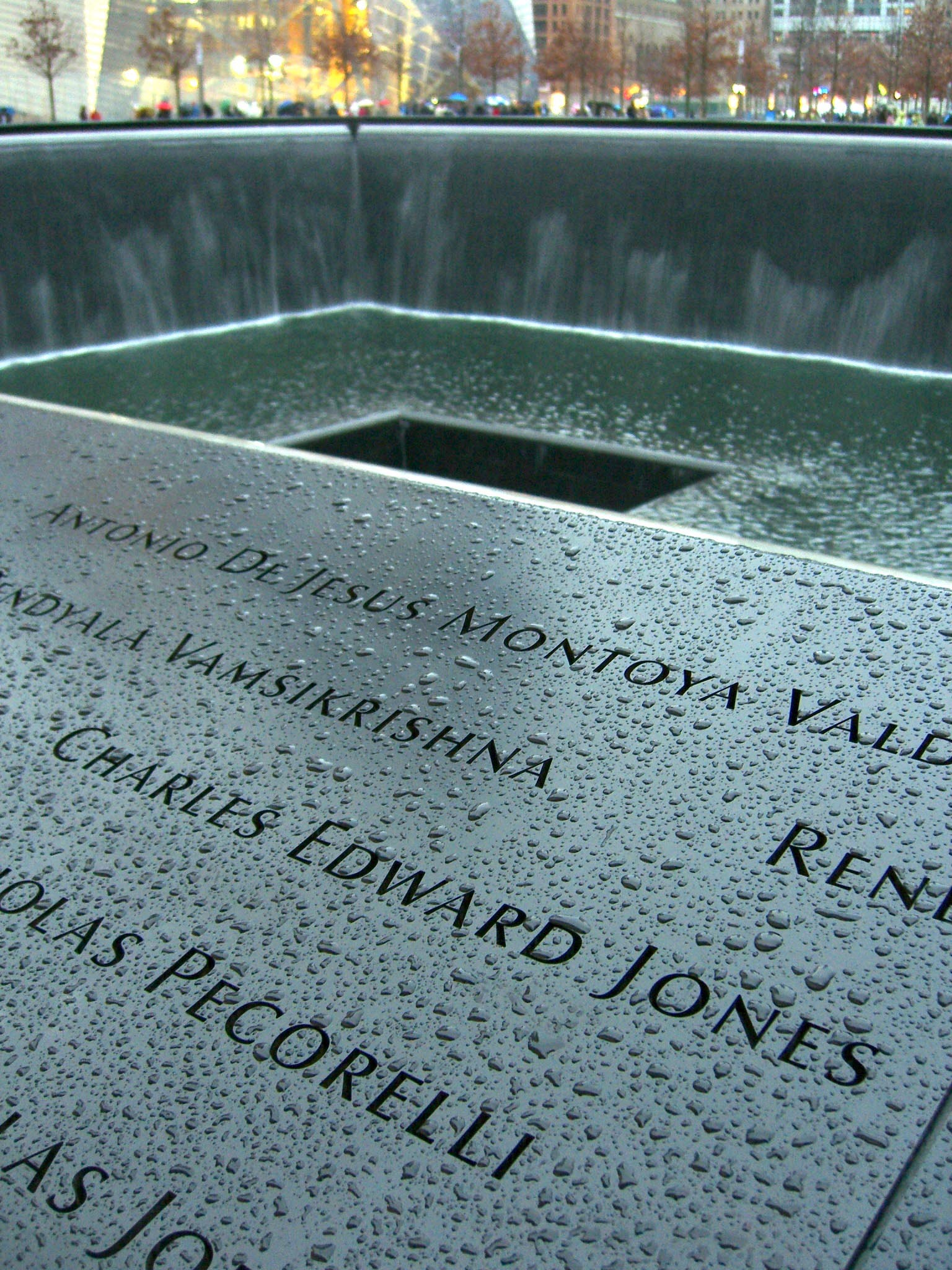
Jones' name is located on Panel N-74 of the National September 11 Memorial's North Pool, along with those of other passengers of Flight 11.

== Military decorations ==
His awards include:

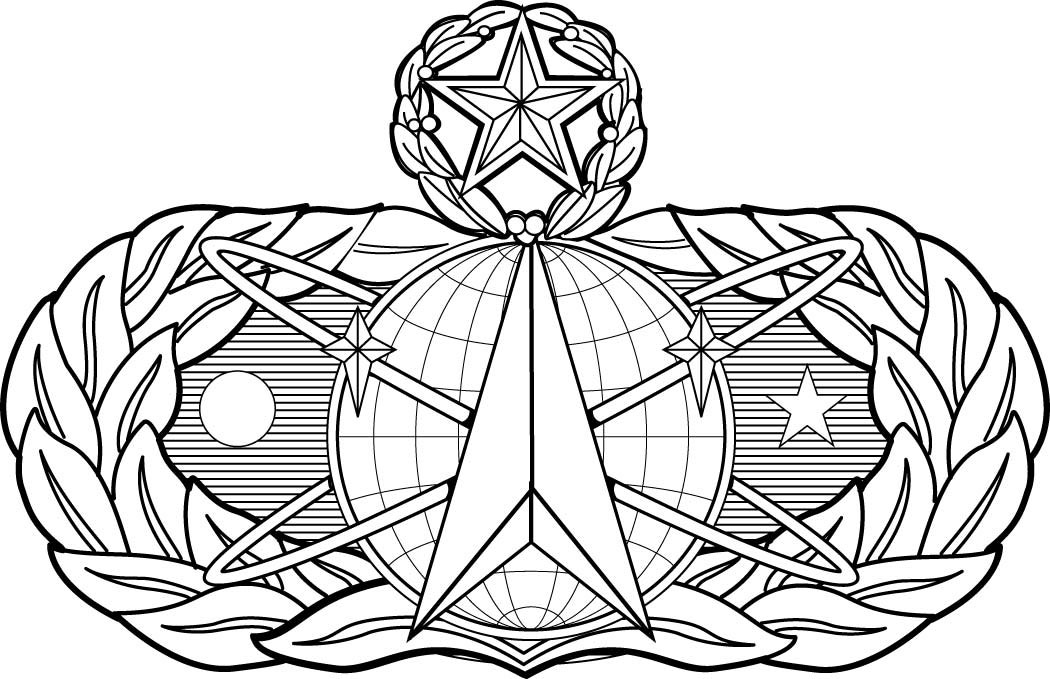

Parachutist Badge
Master Air and Space Missile Badge
Defense Superior Service Medal	Defense Meritorious Service Medal	Meritorious Service Medal with three bronze oak leaf clusters
Air Force Commendation Medal	Joint Service Achievement Medal	Air Force Achievement Medal
Joint Meritorious Unit Award	Air Force Organizational Excellence Award with three bronze oak leaf clusters	National Defense Service Medal with bronze service star
Air Force Longevity Service Award with silver leaf cluster	Small Arms Expert Marksmanship Ribbon	Air Force Training Ribbon

- Senior Missile Badge

== See also ==
- Casualties of the September 11 attacks
