= S. David Griggs =

US Navy admiral and NASA astronaut (1939–1989)

David Griggs
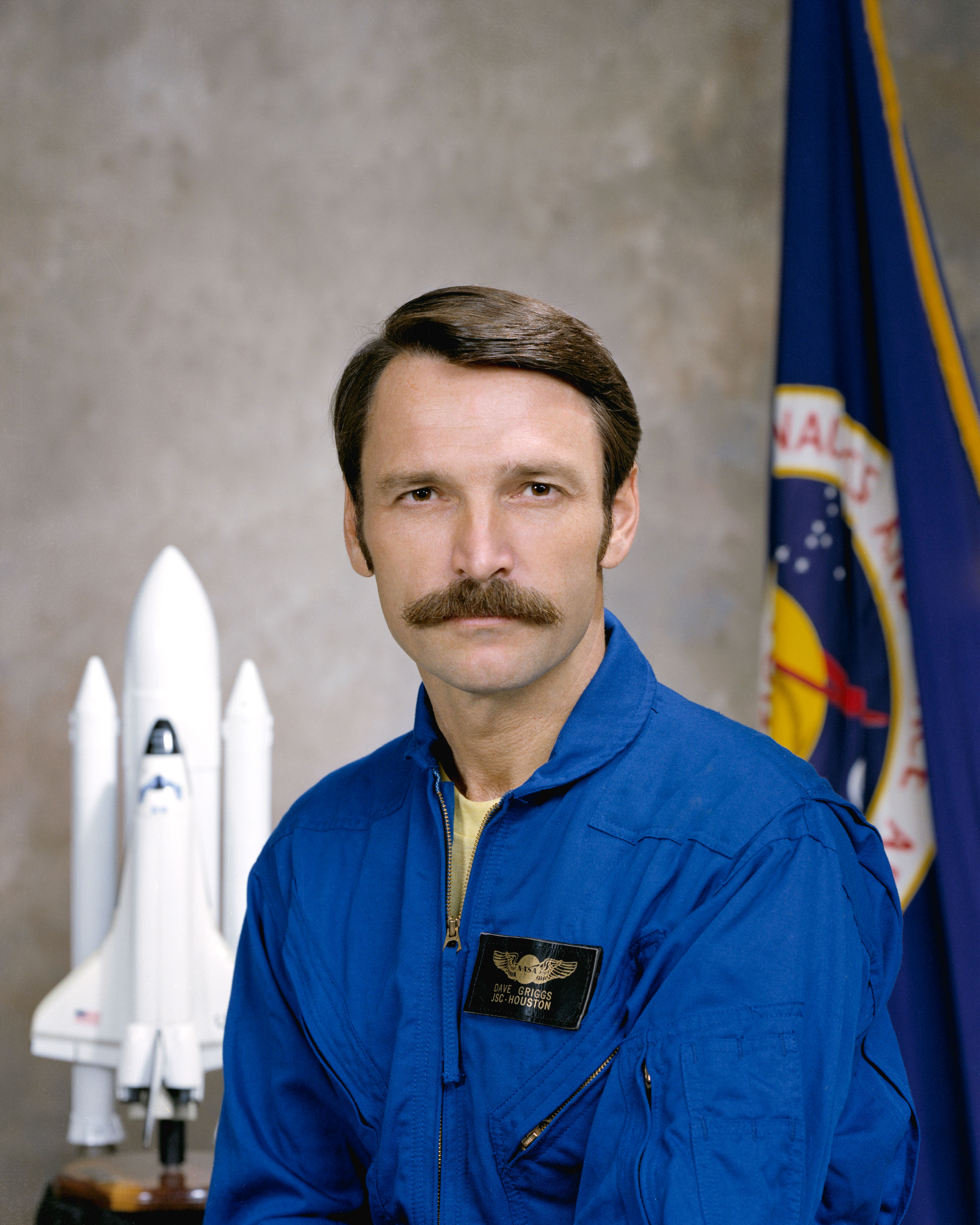
- Griggs in 1978
- Born: Stanley David Griggs; September 7, 1939; Portland, Oregon, U.S.
- Died: June 17, 1989 (aged 49); Earle, Arkansas, U.S.
- Resting place: Arlington National Cemetery
- Education: United States Naval Academy (BS); George Washington University (MS)
- Space career

NASA astronaut
- Rank: Rear Admiral, USN
- Time in space: 6d 23h 55m
- Selection: NASA Group 8 (1978)
- Total EVAs: 1
- Total EVA time: 3h 6m
- Missions: STS-51-D

Stanley David Griggs (September 7, 1939 – June 17, 1989) was a United States Navy officer and a NASA astronaut. He is credited with conducting the first unscheduled extra-vehicular activity of the space program during Space Shuttle mission STS-51-D. Griggs was killed when the vintage World War II-era training aircraft he was piloting – a North American AT-6D (registration N3931S) – crashed near Earle, Arkansas.

== Early life ==
Born September 7, 1939, in Portland, Oregon, Griggs graduated from Lincoln High School in his hometown in 1957. He was an Eagle Scout. In 1962 he received a Bachelor of Science degree from the United States Naval Academy and in 1970 a Master of Science degree in Administration from George Washington University. He enjoyed flying, auto restoration, running, skiing, and diving. He married Karen Frances Kreeb and they had two daughters together, Alison Marie (August 21, 1971) and Carre Anne (May 14, 1974).

== Navy career ==
Griggs graduated from Annapolis in 1962 and entered Naval pilot training shortly thereafter. In 1964, he received his United States Navy pilot wings and was attached to Attack Squadron-72 flying A-4 Skyhawks. He completed one Mediterranean cruise and two Southeast Asia combat cruises aboard the aircraft carriers USS Independence and USS Franklin Roosevelt.

In 1967 Griggs entered the U.S. Naval Test Pilot School at Patuxent River, Maryland and upon completion of test pilot training was assigned to the Flying Qualities and Performance Branch, Flight Test Division, where he flew various test projects on fighter and attack-type aircraft. In 1970, he resigned his regular United States Navy commission and affiliated with the Naval Air Reserve in which he achieved the rank of Rear Admiral.

As a Naval Reservist, Griggs was assigned to several fighter and attack squadrons flying A-4 Skyhawk, A-7 Corsair II and F-8 Crusader aircraft based at Naval Air Stations in New Orleans, Louisiana and Miramar, California.

He logged 9,500 hours flying time, 7,800 hours in jet aircraft, and flew over 45 different types of aircraft including single and multi engine prop, turboprop and jet aircraft, helicopters, gliders, hot air balloons and the Space Shuttle. He made over 300 aircraft carrier landings, held an Airline Transport Pilot License, and was a certified flight instructor.

== NASA career ==
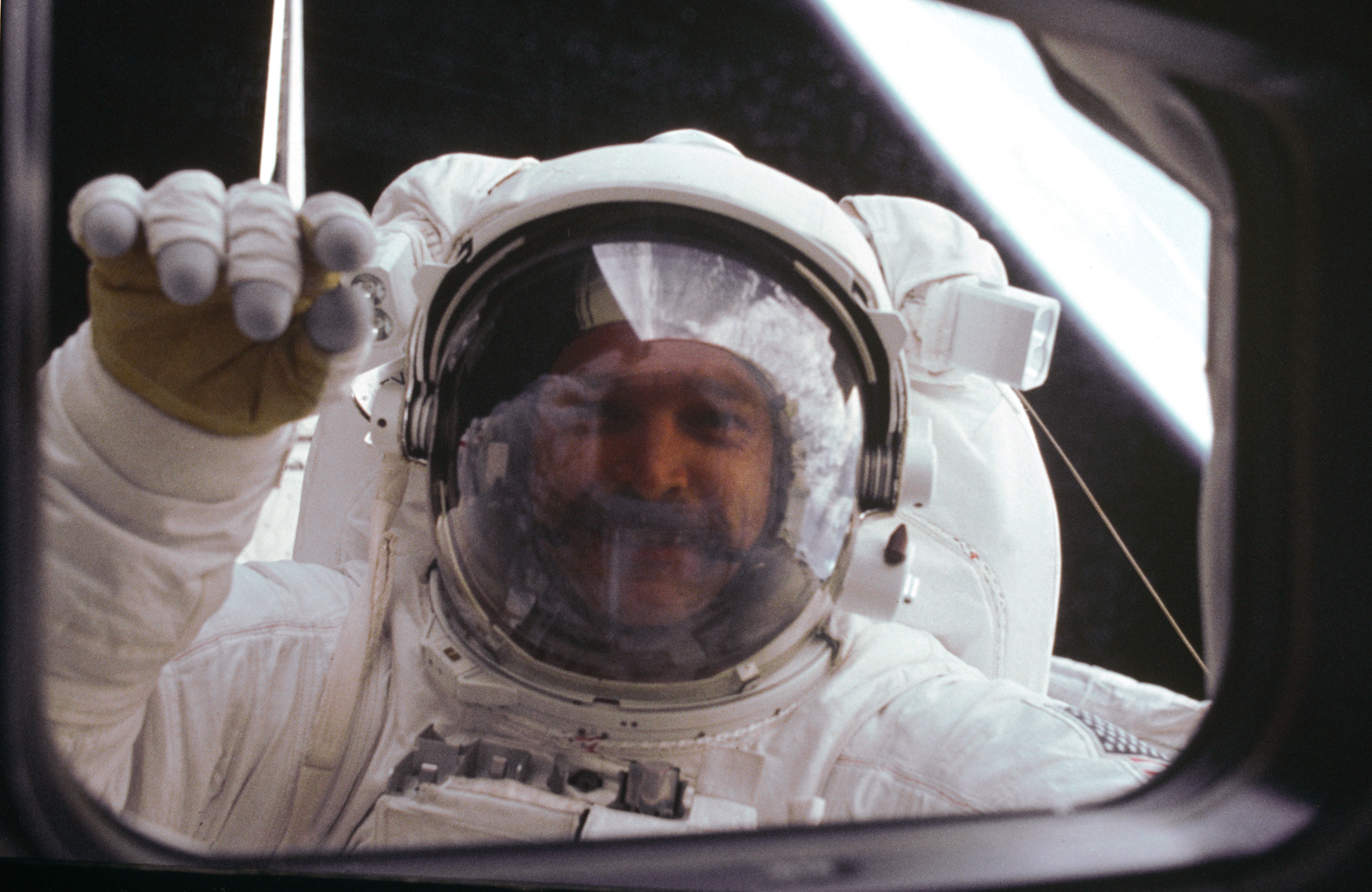
Waving to the orbiter during his 3-hour EVA aboard mission STS-51-D

In July 1970, Griggs was employed at the Lyndon B. Johnson Space Center as a research pilot, working on various flight test and research projects in support of NASA programs. In 1974, he was assigned duties as the project pilot for the Space Shuttle trainer aircraft and participated in the design, development, and testing of those aircraft pending their operational deployment in 1976. He was appointed Chief of the Shuttle Training Aircraft Operations Office in January 1976 with responsibility for the operational use of the shuttle trainer, and held that position until being selected as an astronaut candidate by NASA in January 1978. In August 1979, he completed a one-year training and evaluation period and became eligible for Space Shuttle flight crew assignment.

From 1979 to 1983, Griggs was involved in several Space Shuttle engineering capacities including the development and testing of the Head-Up Display (HUD) approach and landing avionics system, development of the Manned Maneuvering Unit (MMU), and the requirements definition and verification of on-orbit rendezvous and entry flight phase software and procedures. In September 1983 he began crew training as a mission specialist for flight STS-51-D, which flew April 12–19, 1985. During the flight, Griggs conducted the first unscheduled extravehicular activity (space walk) of the space program. The space walk lasted for over three hours during which preparations for a satellite rescue attempt were completed.

At the time of his death, Griggs was in flight crew training as pilot for STS-33, a dedicated Department of Defense mission, scheduled for launch in November 1989. He was buried at Arlington National Cemetery.

== Awards and honors ==
- Defense Distinguished Service Medal
- Distinguished Flying Cross
- Meritorious Service Medal
- Air Medal with two Silver Stars and four Gold Stars
- Navy Commendation Medal with three Gold Stars
- Navy Unit Commendation
- Navy Meritorious Unit Commendation
- National Defense Service Medal
- Vietnamese Cross of Gallantry
- Republic of Vietnam Campaign Medal
- NASA Space Flight Medal
- NASA Achievement Award
- NASA Sustained Superior Performance Award
