= Loren Shriver =

American astronaut (born 1944)

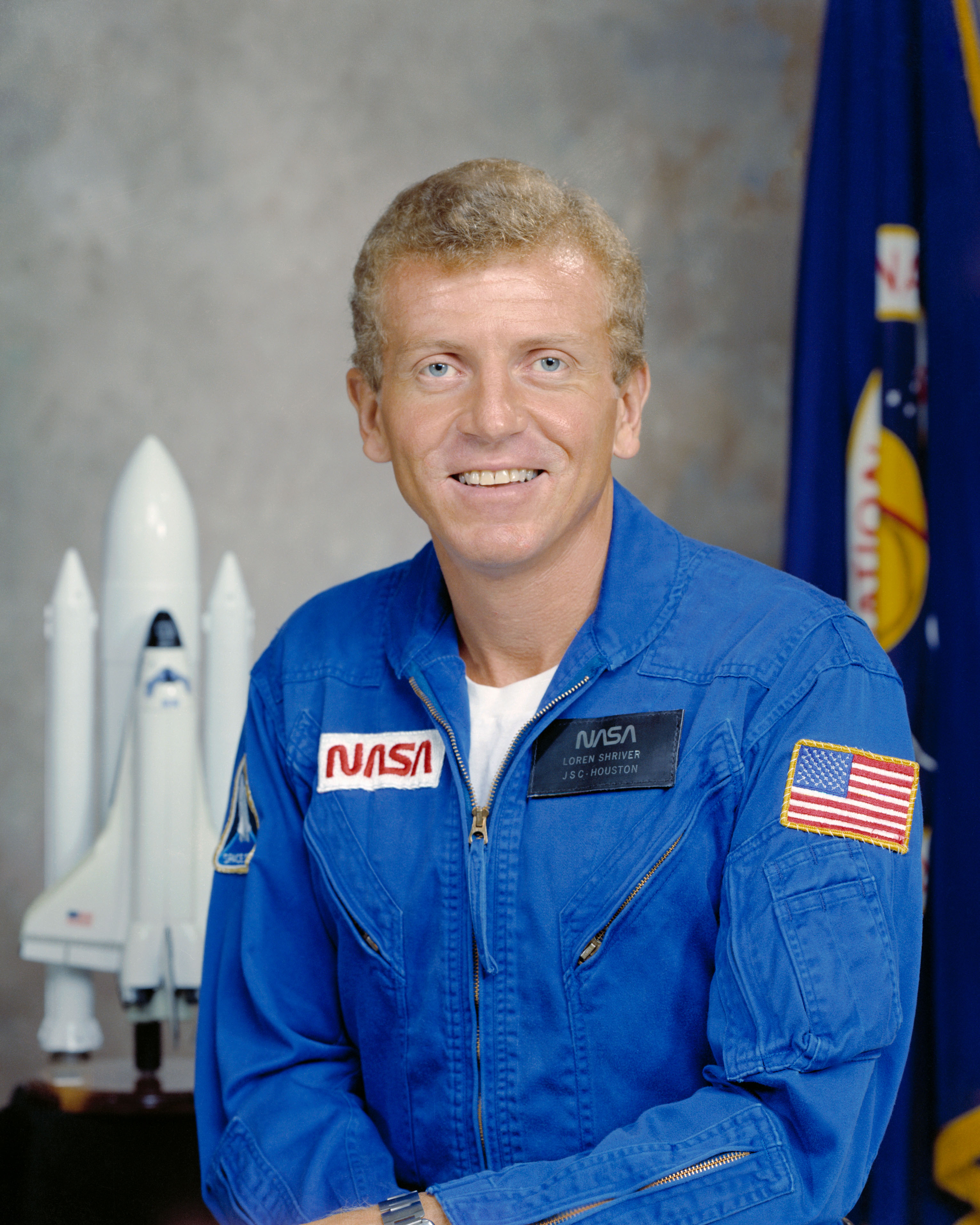
- Born: Loren James Shriver; September 23, 1944 (age 82); Jefferson, Iowa, U.S.
- Education: United States Air Force Academy (BS); Purdue University (MS)
- Awards: Distinguished Flying Cross; NASA Distinguished Service Medal
- Space career

NASA astronaut
- Rank: Colonel, USAF
- Time in space: 16d 2h 4m
- Selection: NASA Group 8 (1978)
- Missions: STS-51-C; STS-31; STS-46
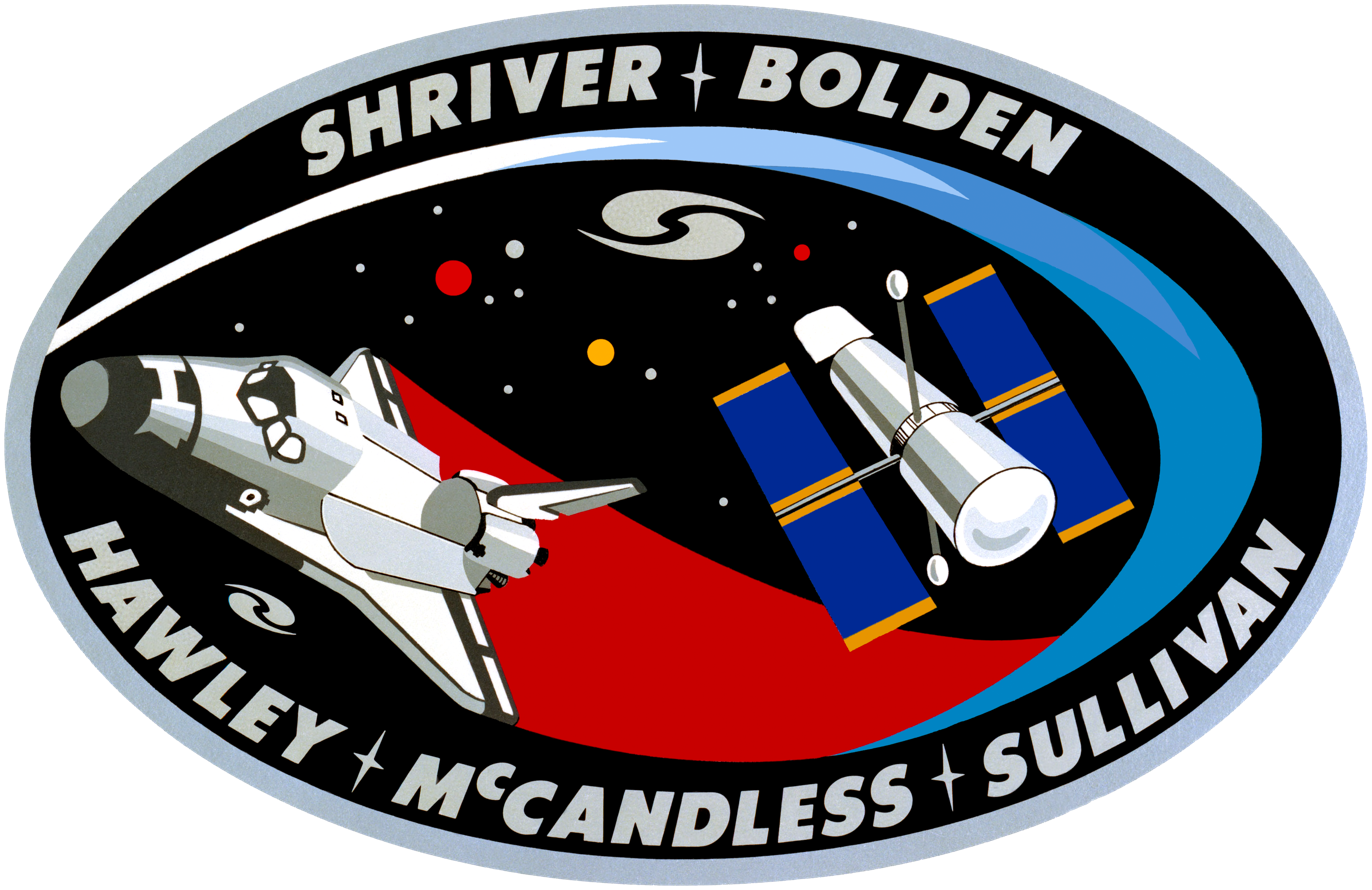
- Mission insignia

Loren James Shriver (born September 23, 1944) is a former NASA astronaut, aviator, and a retired US Air Force Colonel.

== Career ==
Shriver graduated from Paton High School in 1962. He received a Bachelor of Science degree in aeronautical engineering from the United States Air Force Academy in 1967, and a Master of Science degree in astronautical engineering from Purdue University in 1968.

Shriver was commissioned in 1967, and served from 1969 to 1973 as a T-38 academic instructor pilot at Vance Air Force Base, Oklahoma. In 1973 he was then assigned to an overseas tour in Thailand until October 1974. Beginning in 1975, he attended the United States Air Force Test Pilot School at Edwards Air Force Base, California. He was later assigned to the 6512th Test Squadron, and in 1976, he began serving as a test pilot for the F-15 Joint Test Force.

Shriver was selected as an astronaut by NASA in January 1978, participated in three space flights, and logged over 386 hours in space. In September 1982, he was selected as pilot of STS-10, the first Department of Defense mission for the Space Shuttle, but the mission was cancelled. He was pilot of STS-51-C, launched from Kennedy Space Center on January 24, 1985. He commanded a crew of five on his second mission, STS-31 which launched on April 24, 1990. This five-day flight deployed the Hubble Space Telescope. He also commanded mission STS-46 in 1992.

Before his retirement, Shriver was of Deputy Director for Launch and Payload Processing at Kennedy Space Center, Florida. Before taking this position in 1997, he served as the Space Shuttle program Manager for Launch Integration. He was the vice-president of engineering and integration and chief technology officer with United Space Alliance until his retirement from NASA in 2011.

== Personal life ==
The son of Darrell and Jessie (Drayer) Shriver, he was born in Jefferson, Iowa, and is a native of nearby Paton. He and his wife, Susan Diane (née Hane), have three daughters and one son. They reside in Estes Park, Colorado. He has served as commander of American Legion Post 119 in Estes Park from 2018 until the present time.

== Awards and honors ==
- United States Air Force Distinguished Flying Cross
- Defense Superior Service Medal
- Defense Meritorious Service Medal
- Meritorious Service Medal
- Air Force Commendation Medal
- NASA Distinguished Service Medal
- NASA Outstanding Leadership Medal
- NASA Space Flight Medals
- American Astronautical Society Flight Achievement Award, 1990
- American Institute of Aeronautics and Astronautics Haley Space Flight Award, 1990
- Astronaut Hall of Fame, May 3, 2008

Unveiled on October 27, 2016, Col. Shriver's image along with Lt. Col. Dwight Eisenhower and Capt. Darrell Lindsey were featured on Greene County's Freedom Rock which is located in front of the grain elevator in Jefferson. His image was painted by Ray "Bubba" Sorensen of Greenfield.
