= STS-51-D =

1985 American crewed spaceflight to deploy communications satellites

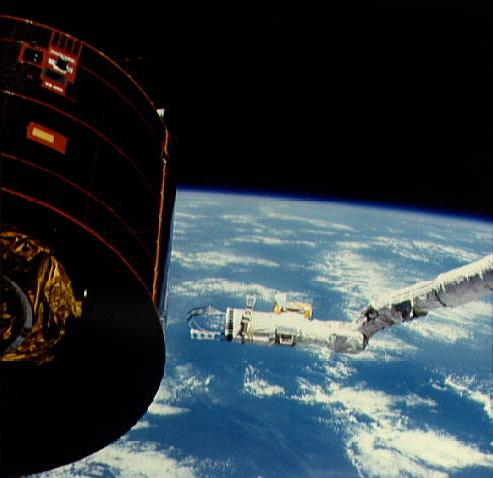
- The crew attempt to activate Syncom IV-3 via a "flyswatter" device attached to Discovery's Canadarm
- Names: Space Transportation System-16
- Mission type: Communications satellite deployment
- Operator: NASA
- COSPAR ID: 1985-028A
- SATCAT no.: 15641
- Mission duration: 6 days, 23 hours, 55 minutes, 23 seconds
- Distance travelled: 4,650,658 km (2,889,785 mi)
- Orbits completed: 110

Spacecraft properties
- Spacecraft: Space Shuttle Discovery
- Launch mass: 113,802 kg (250,890 lb)
- Landing mass: 89,818 kg (198,015 lb)
- Payload mass: 13,039 kg (28,746 lb)

Crew
- Crew size: 7
- Members: Karol J. Bobko; Donald E. Williams; Margaret Rhea Seddon; S. David Griggs; Jeffrey A. Hoffman; Charles D. Walker; Jake Garn
- EVAs: 1
- EVA duration: 3 hours, 6 minutes

Start of mission
- Launch date: April 12, 1985, 13:59:05 UTC (8:59:05 am EST)
- Launch site: Kennedy, LC-39A
- Contractor: Rockwell International

End of mission
- Landing date: April 19, 1985, 13:54:28 UTC (8:54:28 am EST)
- Landing site: Kennedy, SLF Runway 33

Orbital parameters
- Reference system: Geocentric orbit
- Regime: Low Earth orbit
- Perigee altitude: 300 km (190 mi)
- Apogee altitude: 452 km (281 mi)
- Inclination: 28.45°
- Period: 94.40 minutes

Instruments
- American Flight Echo-cardiograph (AFE); Continuous Flow Electrophoresis System (CFES-III); Getaway specials (GASs)Phase Partitioning Experiments (PPE)
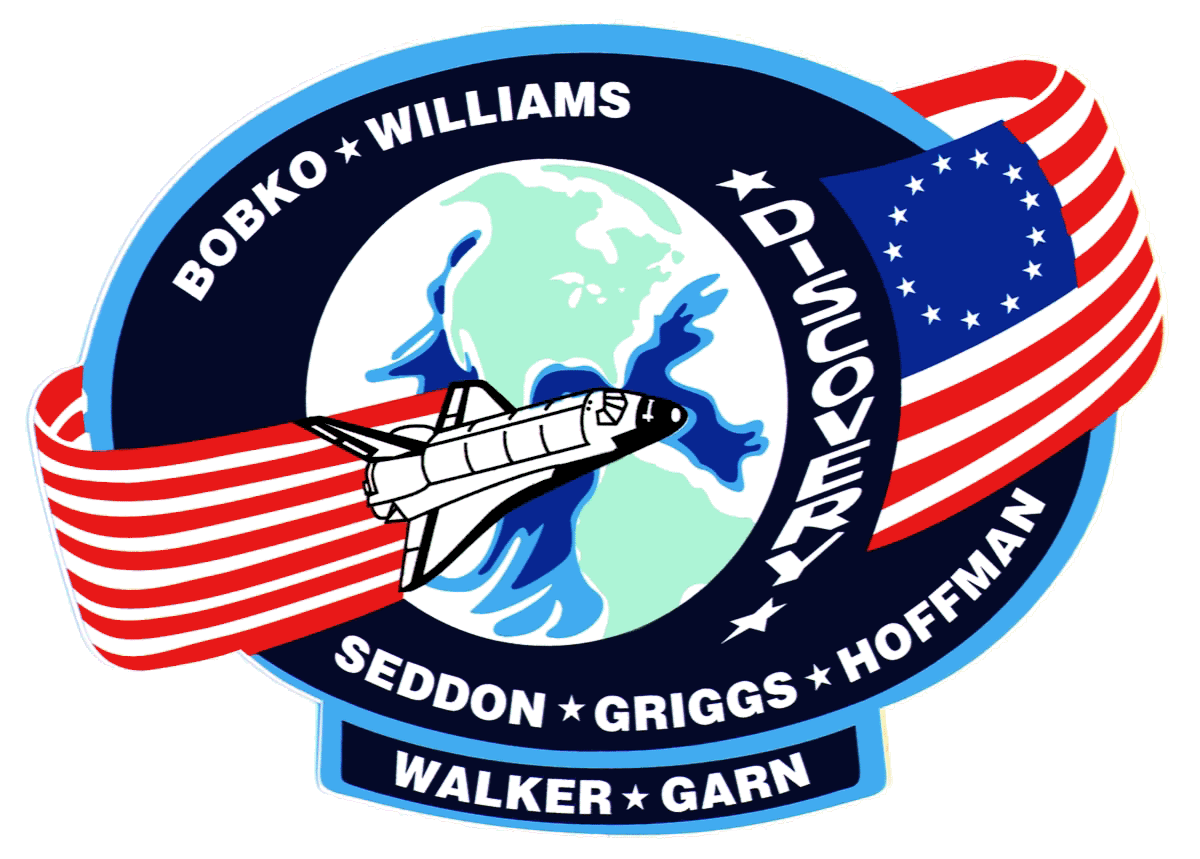
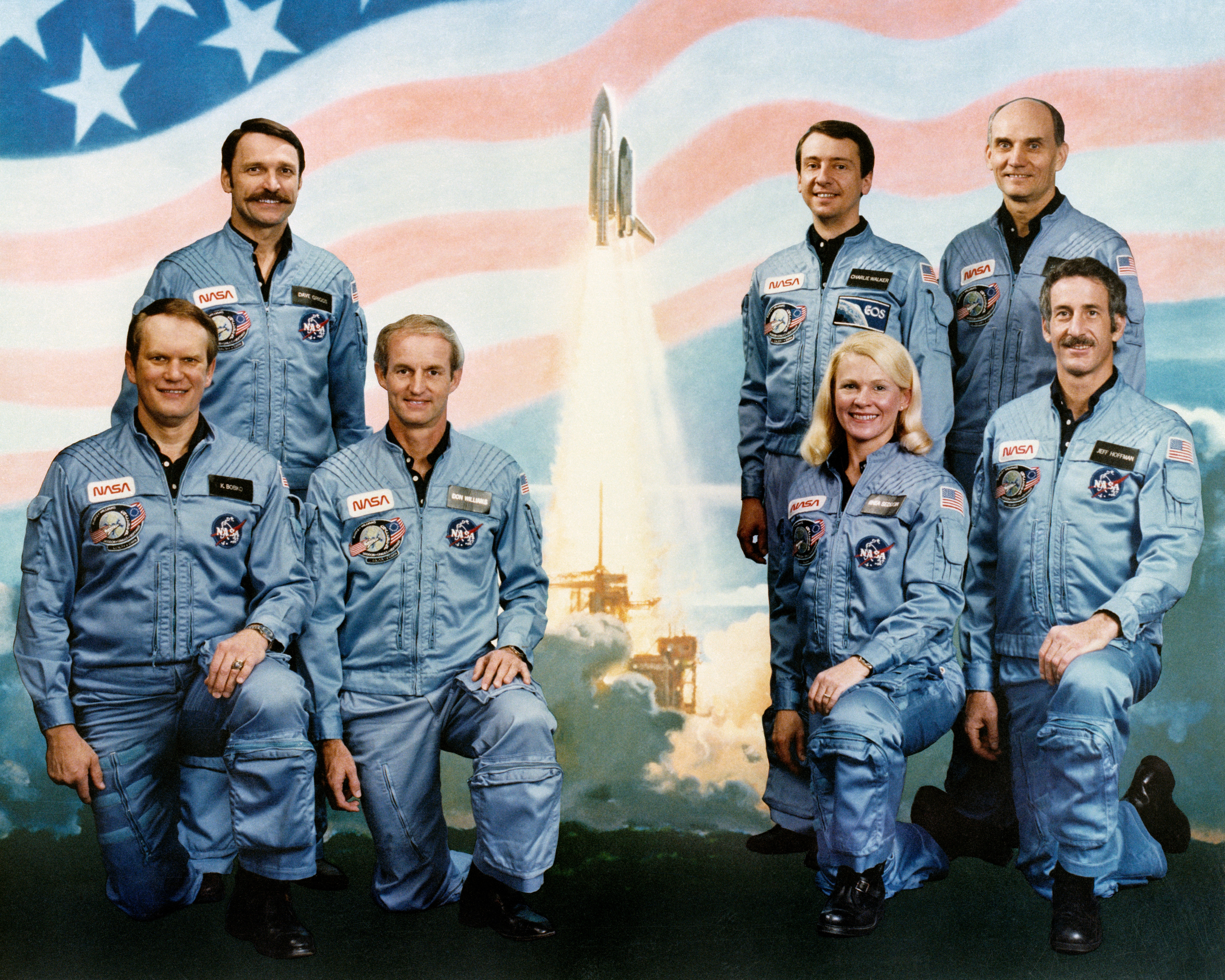
- STS 51-D mission patch Back row: Griggs, Walker and Garn; Front row: Bobko, Williams, Seddon and Hoffman Space Shuttle program

STS-51-D was the 16th flight of NASA's Space Shuttle program, and the fourth flight of Space Shuttle Discovery. The launch of STS-51-D from Kennedy Space Center (KSC), Florida, on April 12, 1985, was delayed by 55 minutes, after a boat strayed into the restricted Solid Rocket Booster (SRB) recovery zone. STS-51-D was the third shuttle mission to be extended.

On April 19, 1985, after a week-long flight, Discovery conducted the fifth shuttle landing at KSC. The shuttle suffered extensive brake damage and a ruptured tire during landing. This forced shuttle landings to be done at Edwards Air Force Base, California for the next five years until the development and implementation of nose wheel steering made landings at KSC more feasible.

== Crew ==
Position	Astronaut
Commander	Karol J. Bobko; Second spaceflight
Pilot	Donald E. Williams; First spaceflight
Mission Specialist 1	Rhea Seddon; First spaceflight
Mission Specialist 2 Flight Engineer	S. David Griggs; Only spaceflight
Mission Specialist 3	Jeffrey A. Hoffman; First spaceflight
Payload Specialist 1	Charles D. Walker; Second spaceflight McDonnell Douglas
Payload Specialist 2	Jake Garn (U.S. Sen. R-UT); Only spaceflight Congressional observer
Garn was a Republican Senator from Utah acting as a congressional observer. He was the first sitting member of Congress in space. Representative Bill Nelson (D-FL) would fly on STS-61-C the next year.

=== Spacewalk ===
- Personnel: Hoffman and Griggs
- Date: April 16, 1985 (≈12:30–15:30 UTC)
- Duration: 3 hours, 6 minutes

=== Crew seat assignments ===
Seat	Launch	Landing	Seats 1–4 are on the flight deck. Seats 5–7 are on the mid-deck.
1	Bobko		Seats 1–4 are on the flight deck. Seats 5–7 are on the mid-deck.
2	Williams		Seats 1–4 are on the flight deck. Seats 5–7 are on the mid-deck.
3	Seddon	Hoffman	Seats 1–4 are on the flight deck. Seats 5–7 are on the mid-deck.
4	Griggs		Seats 1–4 are on the flight deck. Seats 5–7 are on the mid-deck.
5	Hoffman	Seddon	Seats 1–4 are on the flight deck. Seats 5–7 are on the mid-deck.
6	Walker		Seats 1–4 are on the flight deck. Seats 5–7 are on the mid-deck.
7	Jake Garn		Seats 1–4 are on the flight deck. Seats 5–7 are on the mid-deck.

== Mission summary ==
During STS-51-D, the shuttle crew deployed two communications satellites: Telesat-I (Anik C1) and Syncom IV-3 (also known as Leasat-3); both were Hughes-built satellites. Telesat-I was attached to a Payload Assist Module (PAM-D) motor and successfully deployed. Syncom IV-3, however, failed to initiate antenna deployment and spin-up, or ignite its perigee kick motor upon deployment. The mission was consequently extended by two days to ensure that the satellite's spacecraft sequencer start lever was in its proper position. Griggs and Hoffman performed an unscheduled Extravehicular Activity (EVA) to attach homemade "Flyswatter" devices to the shuttle's Remote Manipulator System (Canadarm). Seddon then engaged the satellite's start lever using the RMS, but again the post-deployment sequence did not begin. The satellite was subsequently retrieved, repaired and successfully redeployed during the STS-51-I mission later that year.

Discovery's other mission payloads included the Continuous Flow Electrophoresis System III (CFES-III), which was flying for the sixth time; two Shuttle Student Involvement Program (SSIP) experiments; the American Flight Echo-cardiograph (AFE); two Getaway specials (GASs); a set of Phase Partitioning Experiments (PPE); an astronomical photography verification test; various medical experiments; and "Toys in Space", an informal study of the behavior of simple toys in a microgravity environment, with the results being made available to school students upon the shuttle's return.

Discovery landed on Runway 33 of the Shuttle Landing Facility at Kennedy Space Center at 13:54:28 UTC (8:54:28 am EST local time at the landing site). As the orbiter approached the runway, it was buffeted by a 10-mile-per-hour (16 km/h; 8.7 kn) crosswind from the right, which pushed the orbiter 19 feet (5.8 m) left of the runway's center line as the rear landing gear touched down. As the orbiter rolled out, the crosswind continued to push it towards the left, causing it to drift 65 feet (20 m) from the center line of the 300-foot-wide (91 m) runway. At this point, Commander Bobko began to counteract the drift by applying more pressure to the right-wheel brakes, a technique called differential steering, which brought the orbiter back to the center of the runway. However, he had to apply twice as much force to the right brakes and about 134 feet (41 m) before stopping the brakes on the right-side inboard tire locked up and 5 feet (1.5 m) before stopping the brakes on the right-side outboard tire locked up and the inboard tire blew. The incident prompted NASA to add nose wheel steering to the orbiters, which was complete by late 1985. Until that work was completed, NASA would land the orbiters at the Edwards Air Force Base which offered the option of landing on a long and wide dry lake bed from more directions. Nose wheel steering was also implemented shortly before the Challenger disaster, which would ground the shuttle program for a time. Ultimately, it would be five years until a mission would again land at the SLF, when STS-38 had to divert there due to bad weather at Edwards.

== Wake-up calls ==
NASA began a tradition of playing music to astronauts during the Project Gemini, and first used music to wake up a flight crew during Apollo 15. Each track is specially chosen, often by the astronauts' families, and usually has a special meaning to an individual member of the crew, or is applicable to their daily activities.

Flight Day	Song	Artist/Composer
Day 2	"Top of the World"	The Carpenters
Day 3	"Rescue Aid Society"	Song from the Disney film, The Rescuers

== Gallery ==
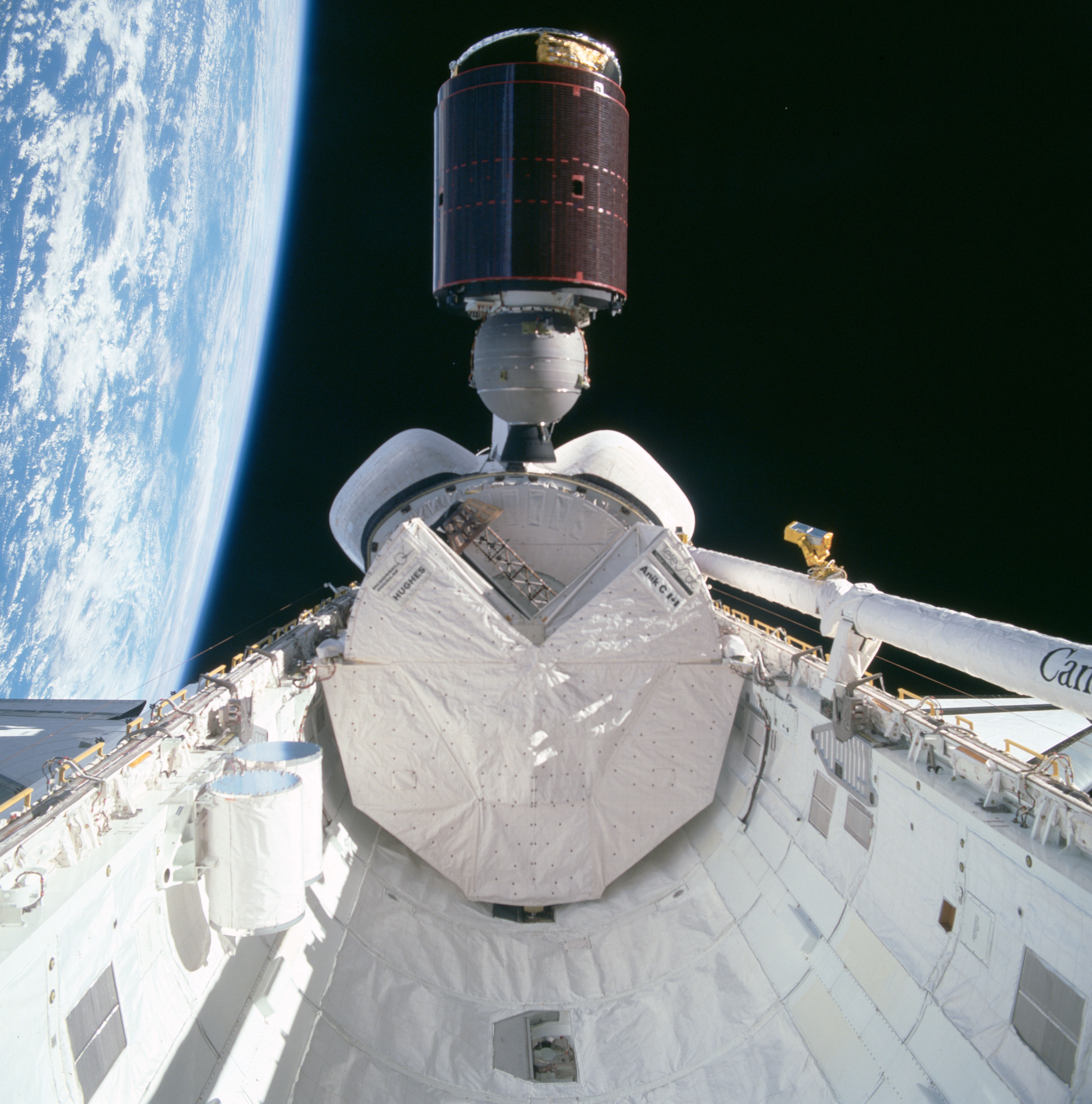
Telesat-I during deployment

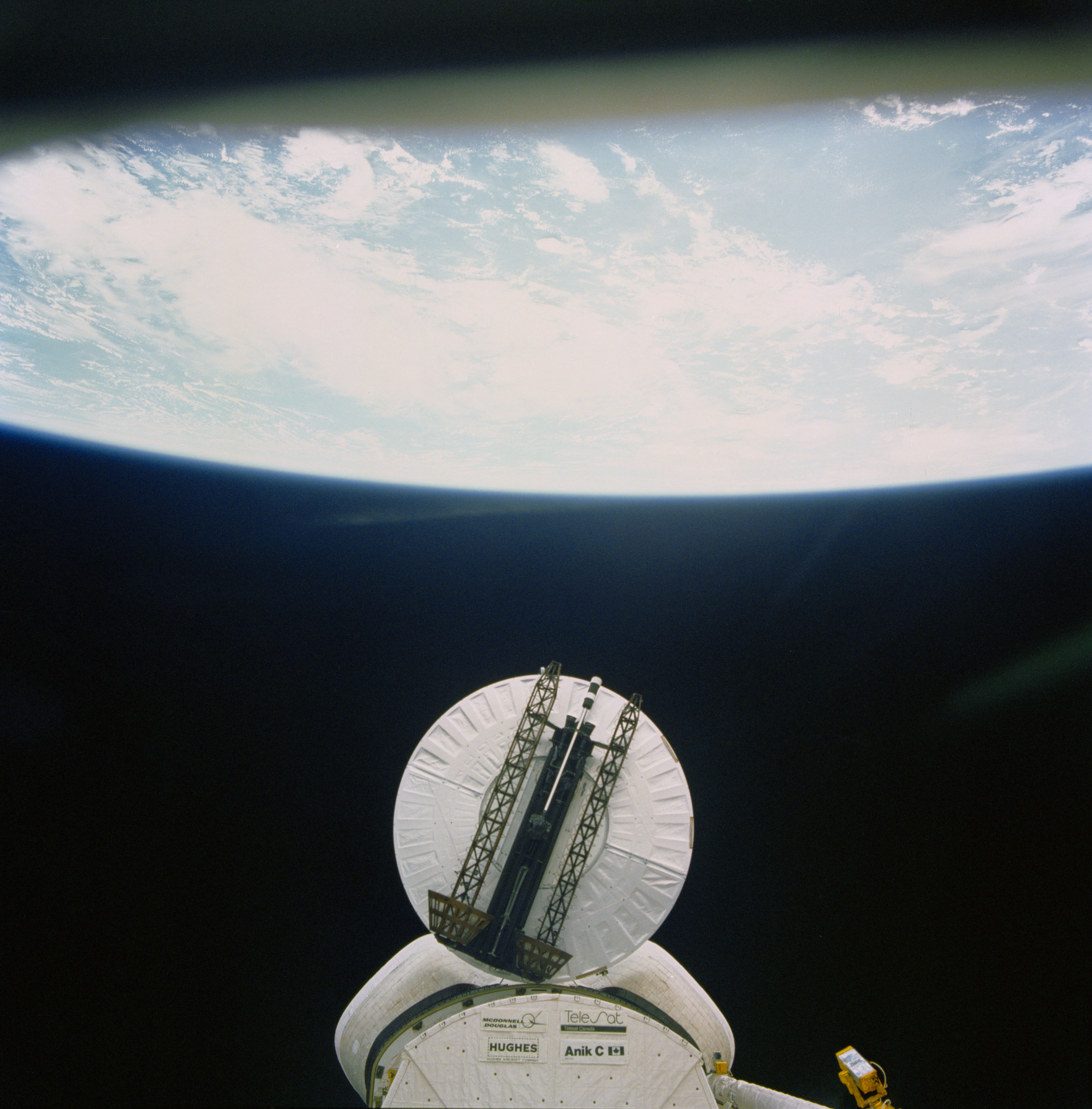
Syncom IV-3 during deployment

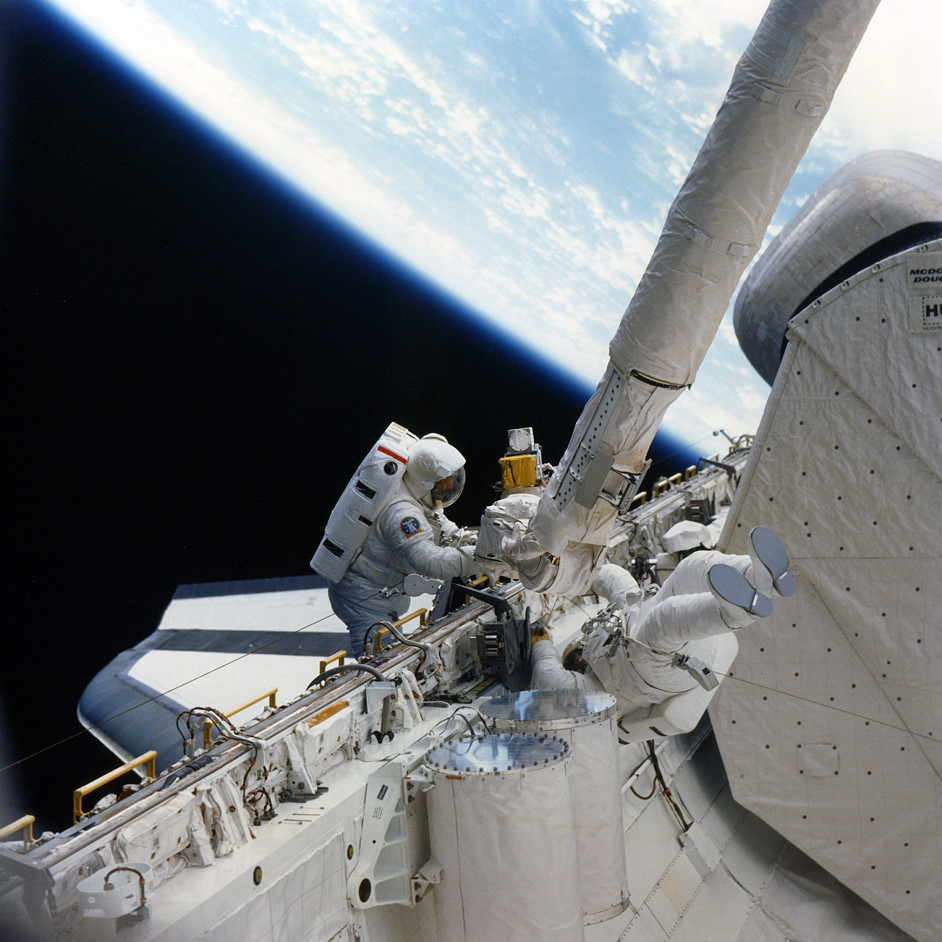
Hoffman and Griggs attach the flyswatter device to the end of the Canadarm.

== See also ==
- List of human spaceflights
- List of Space Shuttle missions
