= Charles Richard Chappell =

American physicist and astronaut candidate (born 1943)

- Born: January 30, 1943 (age 83); Nashville, Tennessee, U.S.
- Education: Vanderbilt University (B.A.), Rice University (Ph.D.)
- Known for: Space Plasma Physics, Spacelab 1 Mission, STS-45 Alternate Payload Specialist
- Awards: NASA Medals for Exceptional Scientific Achievement and Exceptional Service
- Scientific career
- Fields: Physics, Space Science
- Workplaces: NASA, Vanderbilt University

Charles Richard "Rick" Chappell (born January 30, 1943) is an American physicist and former NASA astronaut candidate. He is known for his work in space plasma physics and his contributions to space science education.

== Early life and education ==
Chappell was born in Nashville, Tennessee. He graduated from Hillsboro High School in 1960. He then earned a Bachelor of Arts degree in physics from Vanderbilt University in 1964 where he was awarded a Sloan scholarship. He also obtained a Ph.D. in space science from Rice University in 1970.

== NASA career ==
Rick Chappell joined NASA in 1974, where he conducted research in space plasma physics. From 1976 to 1985, he served as the mission scientist for Spacelab 1, a joint European/American shuttle mission. In May 1994, Chappell was appointed Special Assistant for Environmental Programs, he co-managed the implementation of the K-12 Global Learning and Observations to Benefit the Environment (GLOBE) program. In December 1985, he was selected to train as an alternate payload specialist for the STS-45 mission, which took place in March 1992.

== Research and academic career ==
After his time at NASA, Chappell continued his research and academic career. He has published numerous papers on space plasma physics and has been involved in various space science educational initiatives. He served as the Director of the Dyer Observatory at Vanderbilt University from 2002 to 2009 and has contributed to the promotion of space science education through public outreach and teaching.

== Awards and honors ==
Chappell has received several awards for his contributions to space science and education, including the NASA Medals for Exceptional Scientific Achievement and Exceptional Service. He is honored on the Wall of Honor at the Smithsonian National Air and Space Museum.

== Personal life ==
Chappell is married and has two children. He continues to be active in the field of space science education and public outreach.
