= Taufik Akbar =

Indonesian engineer

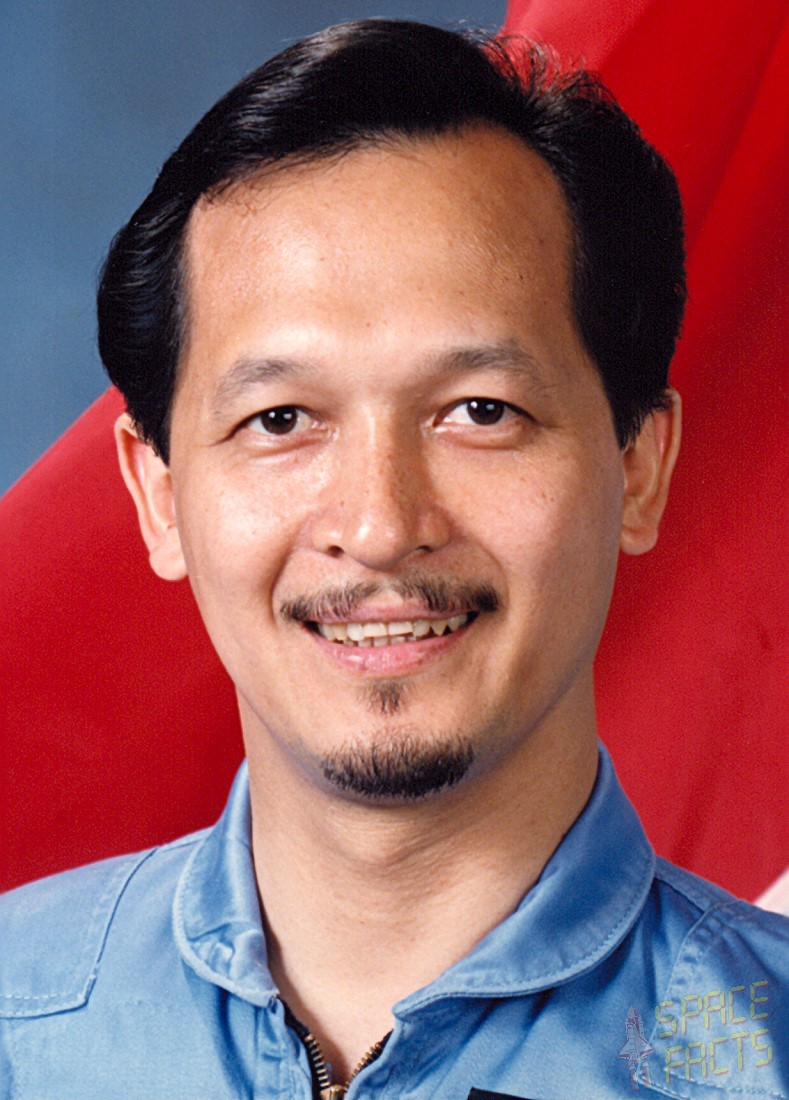
Portrait of Taufik Akbar

Taufik Akbar (born 8 January 1951 in Medan) is an Indonesian engineer and former astronaut candidate.

After graduating at the Bandung Institute of Technology with a Bachelor of Science in Electrical Engineering in 1975, he worked as a telecommunication engineer. While working for Telkom in the development of the Palapa telecommunication satellite system, he was selected to take part in the Space Shuttle mission STS-61-H as a Payload Specialist in October 1985. While Pratiwi Sudarmono was chosen to be in the flight crew, he was supposed to be her backup on the mission. However, after the Challenger disaster the deployment of commercial satellites like the Indonesian Palapa B-3 planned for that mission was canceled, thus the mission never took place. The satellite was later launched with a Delta rocket.

After his astronaut career, he continued to work for Telkom. Within 1990-92, he was General Manager Telecommunication Planning, Executive General Manager for Palapa Satellites Operation (1992–1993), President Director of Aplikanusa Lintasarta (1994–2000). In 2000, he became Director of Human Resources for Sumber Daya Manusia Telkom.
