= Donald E. Williams =

American test pilot, astronaut and engineer (1942–2016)

Donald Williams
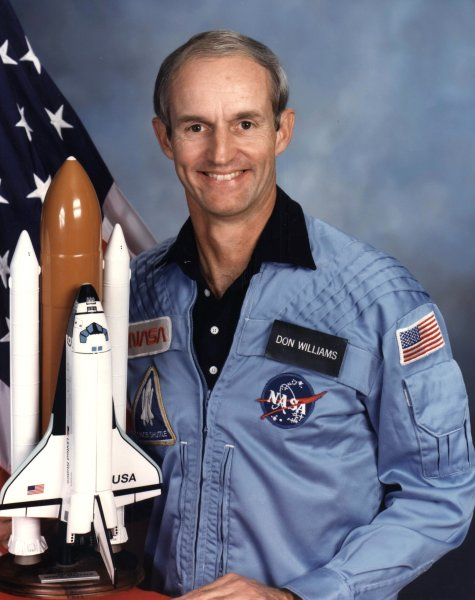
- Born: Donald Edward Williams; February 13, 1942; Lafayette, Indiana, U.S.
- Died: February 23, 2016 (aged 74); Henderson, Nevada, U.S.
- Education: Purdue University (BS)
- Awards: Legion of Merit; Defense Superior Service Medal; Distinguished Flying Cross
- Space career

NASA astronaut
- Rank: Captain, USN
- Time in space: 11d 23h 34m
- Selection: NASA Group 8 (1978)
- Missions: STS-51-D; STS-34
- Retired: March 1, 1990

Donald Edward Williams (February 13, 1942 – February 23, 2016) was an American naval officer and aviator, test pilot, mechanical engineer and NASA astronaut. He logged a total of 287 hours and 35 minutes in space.

== Early life and education ==
Captain Williams was born February 13, 1942, in Lafayette, Indiana and raised in the nearby town of Green Hill. He graduated from Otterbein High School in Otterbein in 1960. He earned a Bachelor of Science degree in mechanical engineering from Purdue University in 1964.

== Navy service ==
Williams received his commission through the Naval ROTC program at Purdue University. He completed flight training at Pensacola, Florida, Meridian, Mississippi and Kingsville, Texas, receiving his Naval Aviator wings in May 1966. After A-4 Skyhawk training, he made two Vietnam War deployments aboard the aircraft carrier USS Enterprise with Attack Squadron 113 (VA-113). He served as a flight instructor in Attack Squadron 125 (VA-125) at Naval Air Station Lemoore, California for two years and transitioned to the A-7 Corsair II aircraft. He made two additional Vietnam deployments aboard Enterprise with Carrier Air Wing 14 staff and Attack Squadron 97 (VA-97). Williams completed a total of 330 combat missions.

In 1973, Williams attended the Armed Forces Staff College. He graduated from the U.S. Naval Test Pilot School at NAS Patuxent River, Maryland, in June 1974, and was assigned to the Naval Air Test Center's Carrier Suitability Branch of Flight Test Division. From August 1976 to June 1977, following reorganization of the Naval Air Test Center, he was head of the Carrier Systems Branch, Strike Aircraft Test Directorate. He reported next for A-7 refresher training, and was assigned to Attack Squadron 94 (VA-94) when he was selected as an astronaut candidate by NASA.

He logged more than 6,000 hours of flying time, which includes 5,700 hours in jets and 745 carrier landings.

== NASA career ==
Selected by NASA in January 1978, Williams became an astronaut in August 1979, qualified for assignment as a pilot on future Space Shuttle flight crews. He then had various support assignments, including working at the Shuttle Avionics Integration Laboratory (SAIL) as a test pilot, and at the Kennedy Space Center participating in orbiter test, checkout, launch and landing operations.

From September 1982 through July 1983, he was assigned as the Deputy Manager, Operations Integration, National Space Transportation System Program Office at the Johnson Space Center. From July 1985 through August 1986, Williams was the Deputy Chief of the Aircraft Operations Division at the Johnson Space Center, and from September 1986 through December 1988, he served as Chief of the Mission Support Branch within the Astronaut Office.

Williams served as pilot on STS-51-D in 1985, and was the spacecraft commander on STS-34 in 1989.

=== Spaceflight experience ===
STS-51-D Discovery (April 12–19, 1985) was launched from and returned to land at the Kennedy Space Center, Florida. During the mission, the crew deployed ANIK-C for Telesat Canada, and Syncom IV-3 for the U.S. Navy. A malfunction in the Syncom spacecraft resulted in the first unscheduled EVA, rendezvous and proximity operations for the Space Shuttle in an attempt to activate the satellite. Additionally, the crew also conducted several medical experiments, two student experiments, activated two Getaway Specials, and filmed experiments with toys in space, including a two-minute sequence where Williams was the first person to juggle in micro-gravity. The mission was accomplished in 109 orbits of the Earth in 167 hours, 54 minutes.

STS-34 Atlantis (October 18–23, 1989) was launched from Kennedy Space Center, Florida and returned to land at Edwards Air Force Base, California. During the mission the crew successfully deployed the Galileo spacecraft, starting its journey to explore Jupiter, operated the Shuttle Solar Backscatter Ultraviolet Instrument (SSBUV) to map atmospheric ozone, and performed numerous secondary experiments involving radiation measurements, polymer morphology, lightning research, microgravity effects on plants, and a student experiment on ice crystal growth in space. The mission was accomplished in 79 orbits of the Earth in 119 hours, 41 minutes.

== Post-NASA career ==
In March 1990, Williams retired from the U.S. Navy as Captain, and left NASA. He joined Science Applications International Corporation (SAIC), working on several projects in the Houston area, nationally, and internationally. In April 2006, Williams retired from SAIC.

Williams died of a stroke February 23, 2016, in Henderson, Nevada, at the age of 74.

== Organizations ==
Williams was a member of the Society of Experimental Test Pilots, the Association of Space Explorers, and the National Aeronautic Association.

== Special honors ==
- Legion of Merit
- Distinguished Flying Cross
- Defense Superior Service Medal
- 2 Navy Commendation Medals with Combat V
- 2 Navy Unit Commendations
- Meritorious Unit Commendation
- National Defense Service Medal
- Armed Forces Expeditionary Medal
- NASA Outstanding Leadership Medal
- NASA Space Flight Medal
- NASA Exceptional Service Medal
- Vietnam Service Medal (with 4 stars)
- Vietnamese Gallantry Cross (with gold star)
- Vietnam Campaign Medal
