= Richard Farrimond =

British engineer and astronaut (1947–2026)

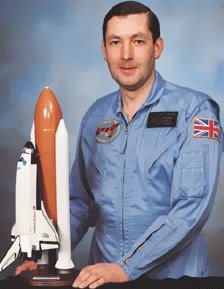
- NASA publicity photograph
- Born: Richard Alfred Farrimond; 15 September 1947; Birkenhead, Cheshire, England
- Died: 26 February 2026 (aged 78)
- Space career

NASA astronaut
- Previous occupation: Engineer; British Army officer
- Rank: Lieutenant-Colonel
- Missions: STS-61-H (cancelled)

Richard Alfred Farrimond (15 September 1947 – 26 February 2026) was a British engineer, army officer and astronaut.

== Life and career ==
Born in Birkenhead (Cheshire), he was educated Clifton College. He studied at the Royal Military Academy, Sandhurst and received a BSc in telecommunications at the Royal Military College of Science, Shrivenham in 1972. At the end of his military career, he was Lieutenant-Colonel in the Royal Corps of Signals of the British Army. After leaving the Army, he worked for British Aerospace, later for Matra Marconi Space and finally with Astrium. On retirement, he studied at King's College London for a history master's degree and his dissertation on 'Britain and Human Space Flight' was published.

In July 1984, he was chosen from the candidates of RAF and Royal Navy, as the backup crew payload specialist to fly with the Space Shuttle mission STS-61-H, which was planned to deliver the British Skynet 4A satellite to space. However, after the Challenger accident this space flight was cancelled, and he left the space program without having flown into orbit.

Farrimond was later a history PhD student at King's College London. He died at home on 26 February 2026, at the age of 78.

== Sources ==
- "Biographien von Internationalen Raumfahrern: Richard Alfred Farrimond" (in German). spacefacts.info.
