= Charles D. Walker =

American astronaut and engineer (born 1948)

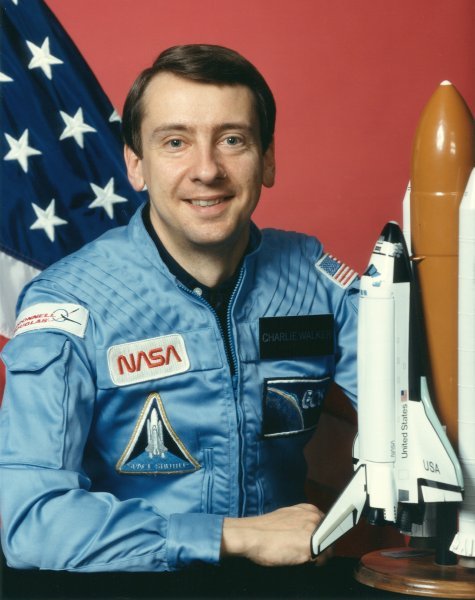
- Born: August 29, 1948 (age 78); Bedford, Indiana, U.S.
- Other name: Charles David Walker
- Education: Purdue University, B.S. 1971
- Occupation: Engineer
- Space career

McDonnell Douglas Payload Specialist
- Status: Retired
- Time in space: 19d 21h 56m
- Missions: STS-41-D; STS-51-D; STS-61-B
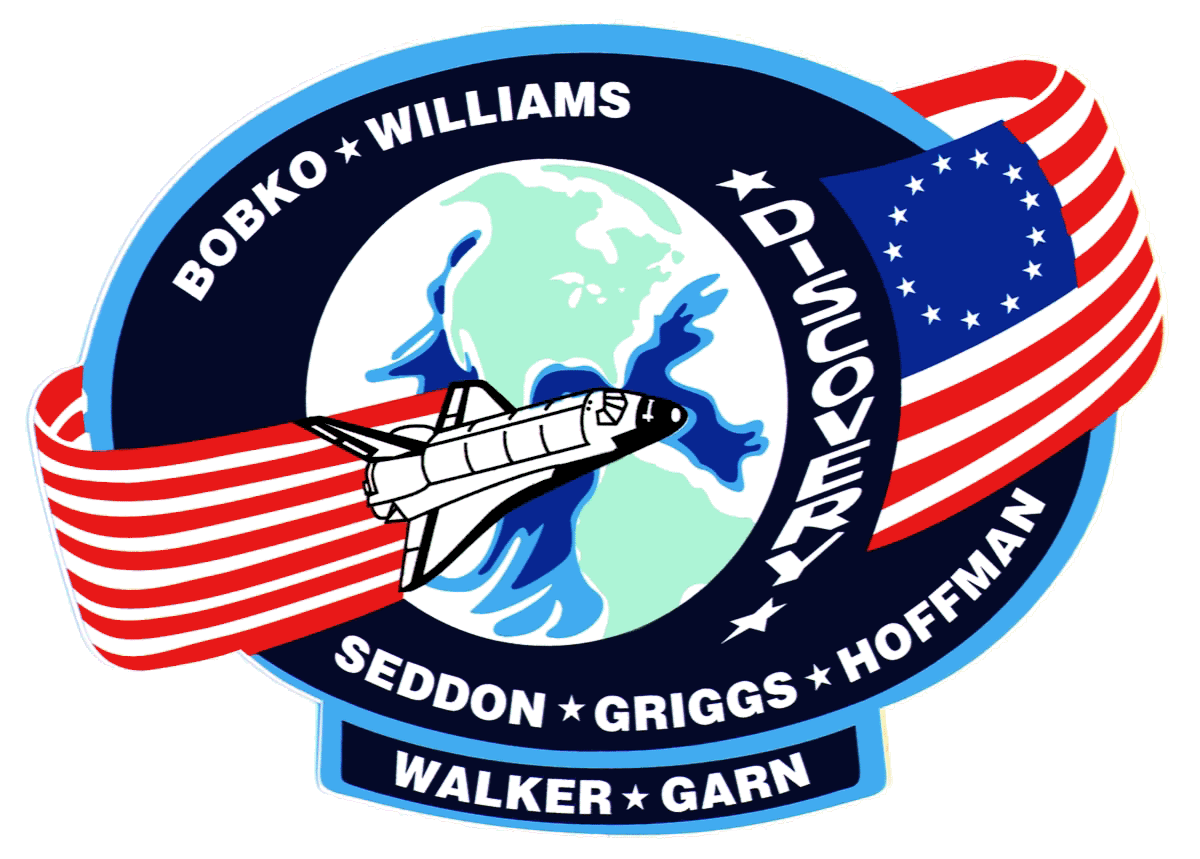
- Mission insignia

Charles David Walker (born August 29, 1948) is an American engineer and astronaut who flew on three Space Shuttle missions in 1984 and 1985 as a Payload Specialist for the McDonnell Douglas Corporation.

== Personal ==
Born in Bedford, Indiana, Walker is married to Susan Y. Flowers, of Joplin, Missouri. They have one daughter and two grandchildren. His recreational interests include photography, running, hiking, scuba diving, reading, collecting books on space, and bonsai.

== Education ==
- 1966: Graduated from Bedford High School, Bedford, Indiana
- 1971: Received a Bachelor of Science degree in Aeronautical and Astronautical Engineering from Purdue University, West Lafayette, Indiana

== Career ==
Following graduation from Purdue University he worked as a civil engineering technician, land acquisition specialist and forest firefighter for the U.S. Forest Service. Subsequently, he was a design engineer with the Bendix Aerospace Company where he worked on aerodynamic analysis, missile subsystem design, and flight testing. He also was employed as project engineer with the Naval Sea Systems Command with responsibility for computer-controlled manufacturing systems.

Walker applied for the 1978 astronaut class but was unsuccessful, as he was neither affiliated with a major university nor had a PhD. He saw the new Payload Specialist program as another way to fly in space, and sought a job that might give him the opportunity to serve as one. He joined the McDonnell Douglas Corporation in 1977 as a test engineer on the Aft Propulsion Subsystem for the Space Shuttle orbiters, then the company's Space Manufacturing (later named Electrophoresis Operations in Space, EOS) team as one of its original members. Walker shares in a patent for the McDonnell Douglas-developed continuous flow electrophoresis (CFES) device. McDonnell Douglas' main partner was Ortho Pharmaceutical, which hoped to manufacture large amounts of purified erythropoietin in space.

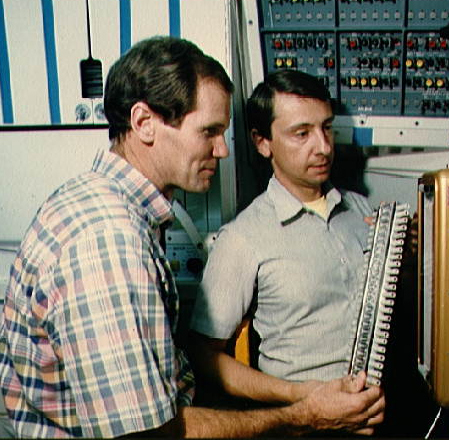
Bill Nelson and Charles Walker inspect hardware for growth of protein crystals in space (1985).

From 1979 to 1986, Walker was chief test engineer and payload specialist for the McDonnell Douglas EOS commercialization project, having told company management that he was interested in flying in space if possible. Walker led the EOS laboratory test and operations team developing biomedical products. His contributions to the program included engineering planning, design and development, product research, and space flight and evaluation of the CFES device. Walker was involved with the program support activities at Kennedy Space Center, Florida, and at the Mission Control Center in Houston, Texas. He was responsible for training the NASA astronaut crews in the operation of the CFES payload on STS-4, STS-6, STS-7, and STS-8 shuttle flights during 1982 and 1983. In May 1986, Walker was appointed Special Assistant to the President of McDonnell Douglas Space Systems Company, working in Washington, D.C.

Walker has been an industry member of the NASA Microgravity Material Science Assessment Task Force, the NASA Space Station Office Quick-is Beautiful/Rapid Response Research Study Group, and the NASA Space Station Operations Task Force. He has been a member of the National Research Council's Space Applications Board. Walker was Faculty Course Advisor and lecturer for the International Space university 1988 summer session. He was a participant in the 1988 Center for Strategic and International Studies' civil Space policy study. He served on the AIAA steering committee formulating the strategic plan for NASA's office of Commercial Programs. Walker has served as a founding board member of the Astronauts Memorial Foundation. He was the organizing committee chairman for the 1992 World Space Congress. He has been a national panel member of the NASA/Industry Manned Flight Awareness Program and the NASA/Industry Education Initiative. Walker advised the NASA/Purdue University space life support research center, a NASA/Penn State space commercial development center and a U.S. Department of Education/Ohio State University science education center. He has been a board director of the Challenger Center for Space Science Education. Walker has served as the volunteer chairman of the board of directors of Spacecause, and is past president and board director of the National Space Society. He has also been a board director of the Association of Space Explorers. As an advisor, Walker works with commercial space firms Space Adventures, Ltd and Deep Space Industries, Inc., and the Commercial Spaceflight Federation. Walker is a professional engineer registered in California. He has been an expert witness testifying before committees of the U.S. Congress. He has authored several papers and book contributions on the EOS electrophoresis program, space development, commercialization, and space history. Walker has also written columns and articles appearing in national newspapers and numerous other publications.

Walker retired in 2005 as the Director for NASA Systems Government Relations with the Washington D.C. Operations office of The Boeing Company. In 2018, Walker, joined Solstar as an advisor. Walker is currently a consultant, author and lecturer.

== NASA activities ==
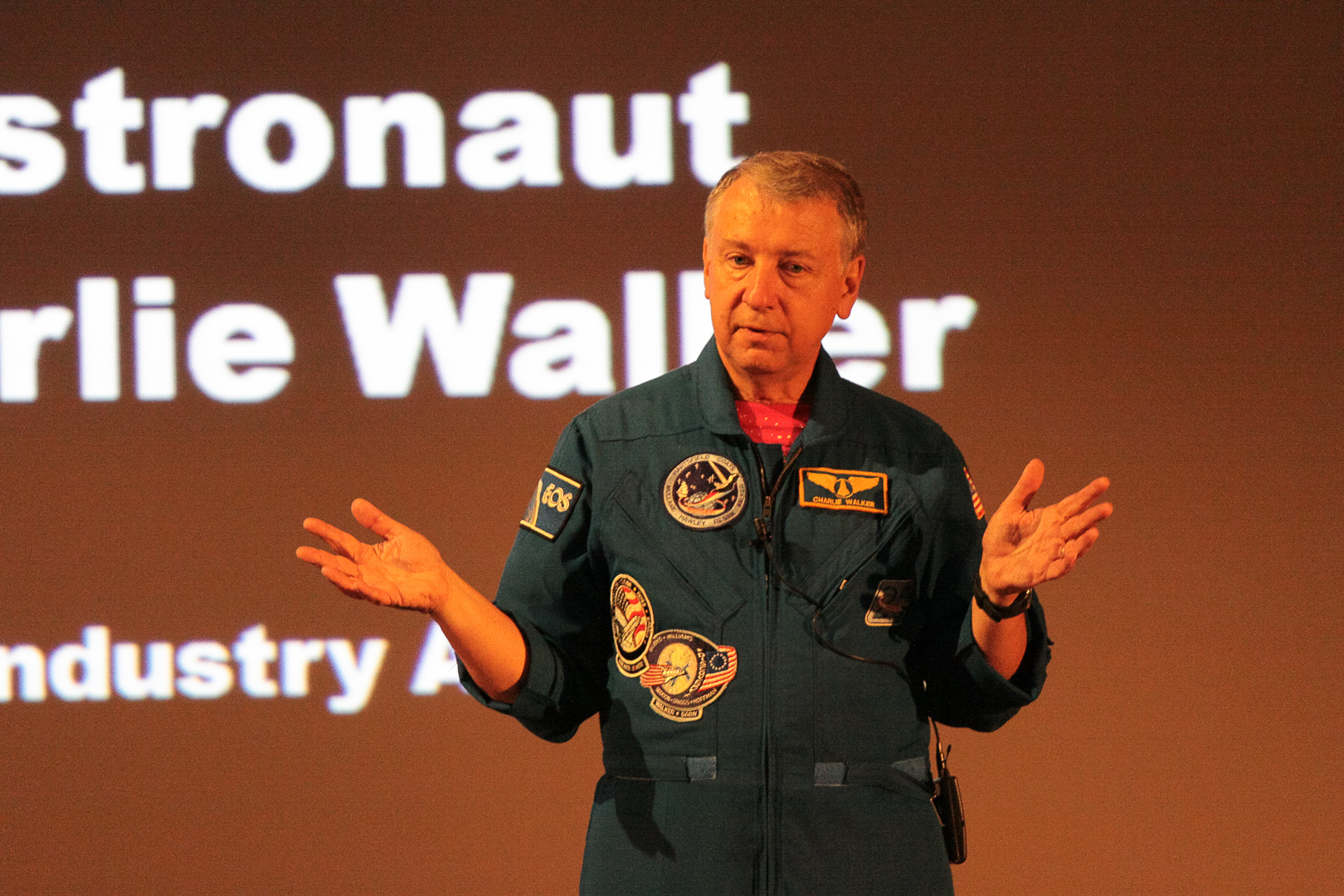
Charlie Walker speaking to visitors of the Kennedy Space Center Visitor Complex (2009)

STS-4 demonstrated the difficulty of Walker assisting astronauts with the complex CFES device. He and others could not speak directly to the space shuttle; the capsule communicator and two other people approved and relayed all messages to space. McDonnell Douglas proposed that Walker fly as a payload specialist to operate the CFES himself. NASA calculated that flying Walker would cost McDonnell Douglas $40,000 per flight, and in May 1983 he was assigned to STS-41-D.

Walker's flight was part of a NASA effort in the 1980s to fly civilians on the shuttle. Although Europeans were training for Spacelab Payload Specialist duties, Walker remained a McDonnell Douglas employee, and commuted between company headquarters in St. Louis, Missouri and the Johnson Space Center in Houston, Texas. Training included a flight on a Northrop T-38 Talon jet trainer aircraft, and about 40 flights on the "Vomit Comet". He later stated that his experience showed that a "working passenger" could fly after an abbreviated training program of a few months.

Although Walker believed at the time that 41-D would be his only flight, he also accompanied the CFES equipment on STS-51-D, and STS-61-B, accumulating 20 days of experience in space and traveling 8.2 million miles. Aboard these Space Shuttle missions Walker also performed early protein crystal growth experiments and participated as a test subject in numerous medical studies. He began training fellow McDonnell Douglas employee Robert Wood to fly on STS-61-M in 1986, and expected to fly at least once more himself, perhaps on Space Station Freedom, before the destruction of Challenger in January 1986 ended commercial shuttle payloads.

Since 1986 Walker has served in various NASA study and review team capacities including as a member of the NASA Microgravity Material Science Assessment Task Force, the NASA Space Station Office Quick-is-Beautiful/Rapid Response Research Study Group, the NASA Space Station Operations Task Force, and the International Space Station Strategic Roadmap Committee. He has served on the national panels of the NASA/Industry Manned Flight Awareness Program and the NASA/Industry Education Initiative. He also makes a public appearance occasionally to sign memorabilia at the Kennedy Space Center Visitor Complex and also appears for the complex's "Lunch with an Astronaut" program.

== Awards and honors ==
- U.S. Patent No. 4,394,246, Electrophoresis Apparatus with Flow Control, issued 19 July 1983
- NASA Space Flight Medals, 1984 and twice in 1985
- Sagamore of the Wabash, State of Indiana (November 1984)
- Doctor of Science, honoris causa, St. Louis College of Pharmacy (1985)
- Aerospace Laurels Award, Aviation Week & Space Technology Magazine (1985)
- Lindbergh Award, American Institute of Aeronautics and Astronautics – St. Louis Section (1986)
- NASA Group Achievement Award, as consultant to the 1987–1988 Space Station Operations Task Force
- Engineering Astronaut Alumnus Award, Purdue University Schools of Engineering (September 1989)
- Kentucky Colonel, Commonwealth of Kentucky (May 1990)
