= Pratiwi Sudarmono =

Indonesian scientist (born 1952)

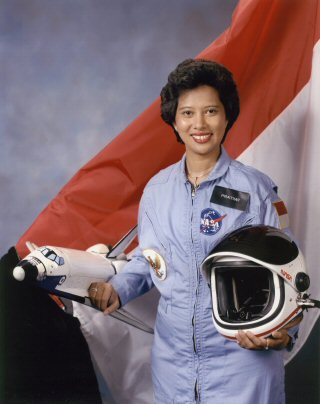
- Born: Pratiwi Pujilestari Sudarmono; 31 July 1952 (age 74); Bandung, West Java, Indonesia
- Education: University of Indonesia (M.Sc); University of Osaka (Ph.D)
- Occupation: Scientist
- Space career

LAPAN astronaut
- Status: Retired
- Selection: September 30, 1985
- Missions: STS-61-H (Canceled)

Pratiwi Pujilestari Sudarmono (born 31 July 1952) is an Indonesian scientist. She is currently a professor of microbiology at the University of Indonesia, Jakarta.

== Early life and education ==
Pratiwi Sudarmono was born on 31 July 1952 in Bandung, Indonesia. From an early age she showed a strong interest in science. She completed her primary and secondary schooling in Bandung before moving to Jakarta, where she finished her high school education.

Pratiwi Sudarmono received a master's degree from the University of Indonesia in 1977, and the Ph.D. in Molecular Biology from the University of Osaka, Japan, in 1984.

== Career ==
She then started her scientific career as WHO grantee researching the molecular biology of Salmonella typhi. From 1994 to 2000, she was head of the Department of Microbiology of the Medical Faculty of the University of Indonesia. From 2001 to 2002, she was a scholar in the Fulbright New Century Scholars Program.

=== Space Shuttle Mission STS-61-H ===
In October 1985, she was selected to take part in the NASA Space Shuttle mission STS-61-H scheduled in mid-1986 as a Payload Specialist, she would have been the first Asian woman in space if the mission should proceed as planned. Taufik Akbar was her backup on the mission. However, after the Challenger disaster in 1986, the deployment of commercial satellites like the Indonesian Palapa B-3 planned for the STS-61-H mission was canceled, thus the mission never took place. The satellite was later launched with a Delta rocket.

== Awards and honors ==
In 2019, Sudarmono was the recipient of the GE Indonesia Recognition for Inspiring Women in STEM award.
