= STS-61-H =

Canceled Space Shuttle mission

- Names: Space Transportation System
- Mission type: Communications satellites deployment (planned)
- Operator: NASA
- Mission duration: 7 days, 7 hours, 51 minutes, 51 seconds (planned)

Spacecraft properties
- Spacecraft: Space Shuttle Columbia (planned)
- Launch mass: 1,217,990 kg (2,685,210 lb)
- Landing mass: 90,584 kg (199,704 lb)
- Payload mass: 21,937 kg (48,363 lb)

Crew
- Crew size: 7 (planned)
- Members: Michael L. Coats; John E. Blaha; Robert C. Springer; Anna L. Fisher; James F. Buchli; Pratiwi Sudarmono; Nigel R. Wood

Start of mission
- Launch date: 24 June 1986, 13:09:00 UTC (planned)
- Rocket: Space Shuttle Columbia
- Launch site: Kennedy Space Center, LC-39B
- Contractor: Rockwell International

End of mission
- Landing date: 1 July 1986, 21:00:51 UTC (planned)
- Landing site: Kennedy Space Center, Runway 15

Orbital parameters
- Reference system: Geocentric orbit (planned)
- Regime: Low Earth orbit
- Perigee altitude: 285 km (177 mi)
- Apogee altitude: 295 km (183 mi)
- Inclination: 28.45°
- Period: 90.40 minutes
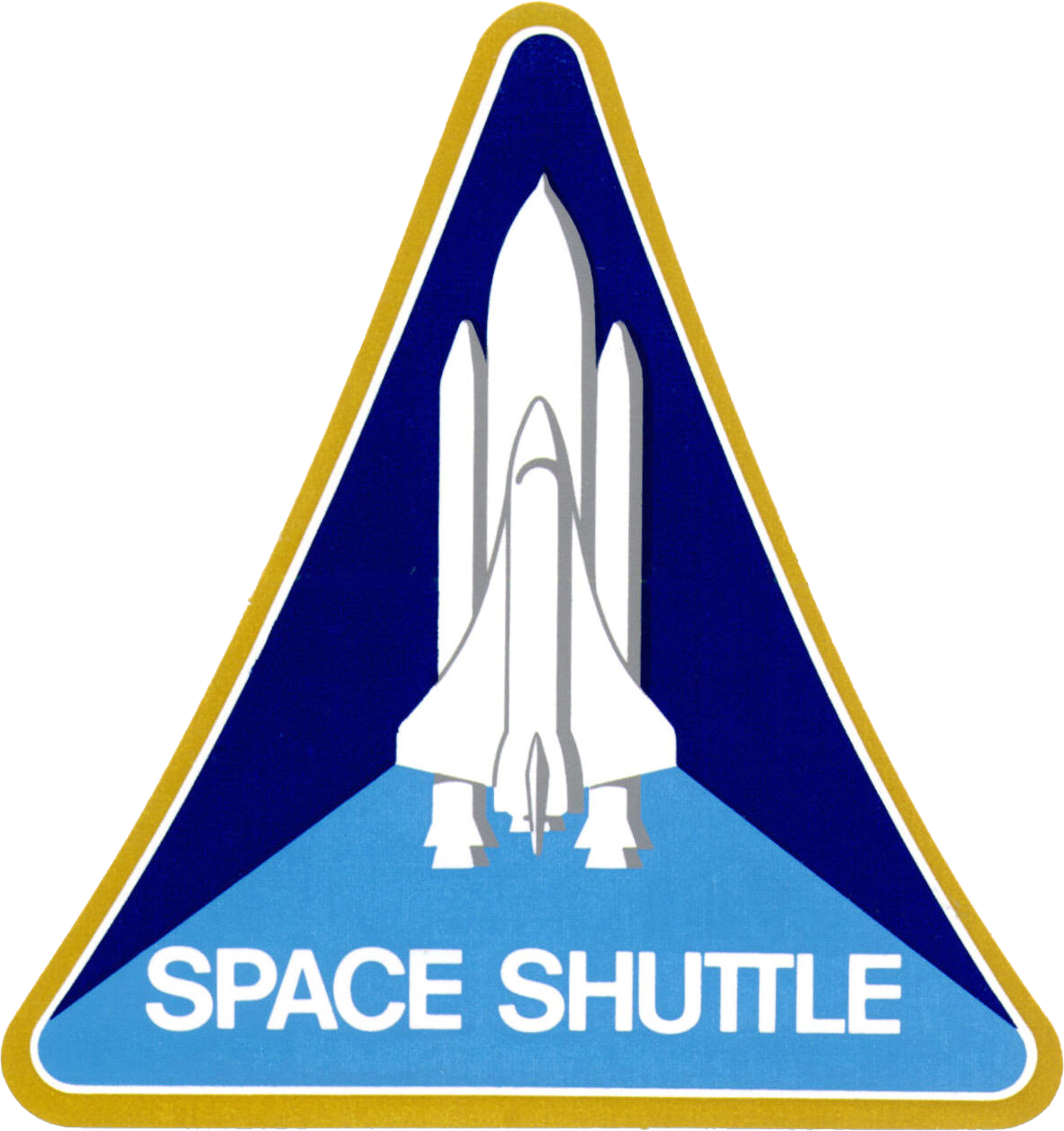
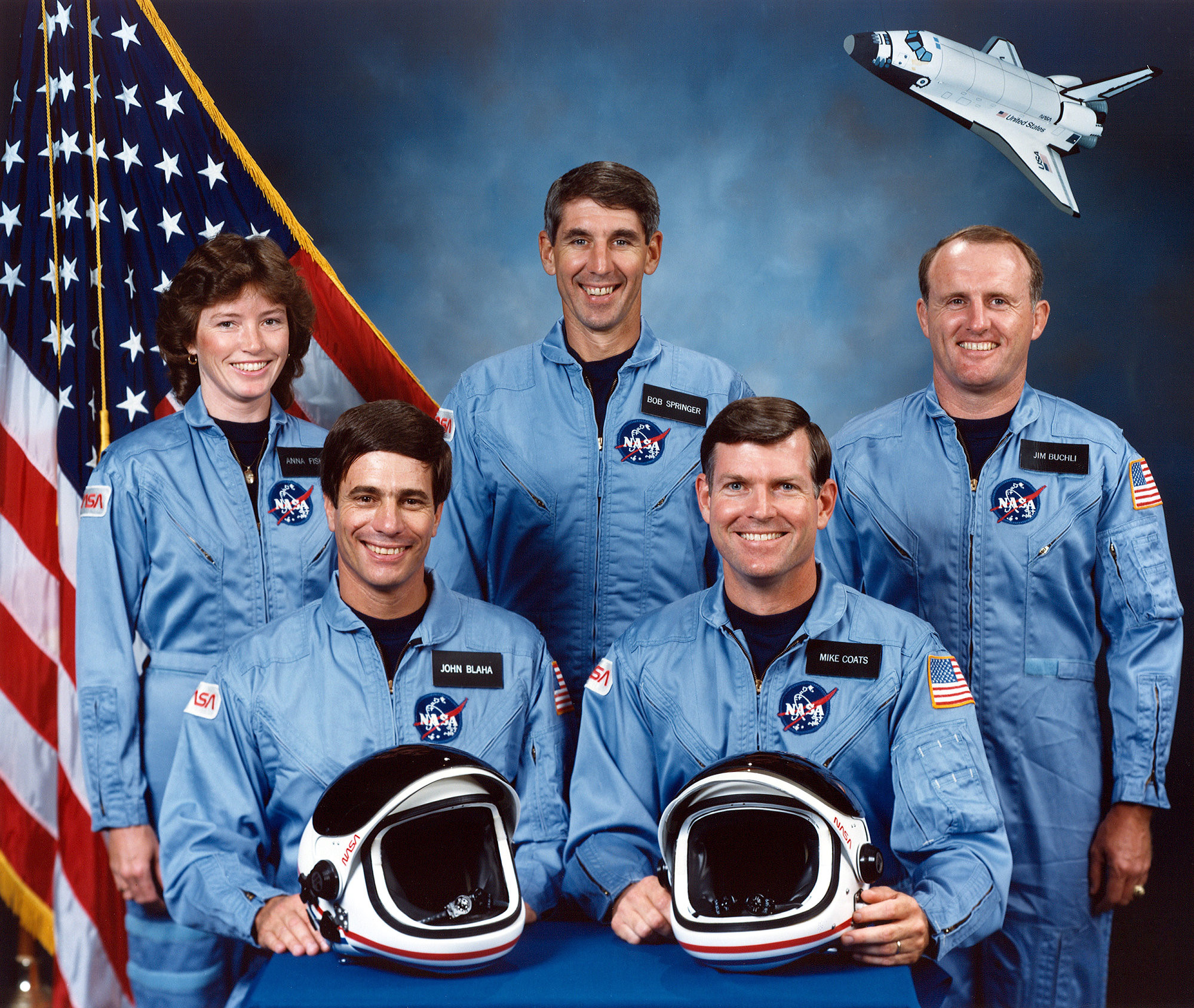
- Space Shuttle patch Back row: Anna L. Fisher, Robert C. Springer, James F. Buchli; Front row: John E. Blaha and Michael L. Coats Space Shuttle program Cancelled Shuttle missions

STS-61-H was a NASA Space Shuttle mission planned to launch on 24 June 1986 using Columbia. However, it was canceled after the Challenger disaster.

== Crew ==
Position	Astronaut
Commander	(United States) Michael L. Coats; Would have been second space mission
Pilot	(United States) John E. Blaha; Would have been first space mission
Mission Specialist 1	(United States) Robert C. Springer; Would have been first space mission
Mission Specialist 2	(United States) Anna L. Fisher; Would have been second space mission
Mission Specialist 3	(United States) James F. Buchli; Would have been third space mission
Payload Specialist 1	(Indonesia) Pratiwi Sudarmono; Would have been first space mission
Payload Specialist 2	(United Kingdom) Nigel R. Wood; Would have been first space mission

=== Backup crew ===
Position	Astronaut
Payload Specialist 1	(Indonesia) Taufik Akbar
Payload Specialist 2	(United Kingdom) Richard A. Farrimond

== Crew notes ==
Before Buchli was assigned to STS-61-H, Norman E. Thagard was the potential Mission Specialist 3 for this flight.

== Mission objectives ==
The main task of the mission was to bring two commercial satellites into orbit – Palapa B3 and Westar-6S, and military communication satellite - Skynet-4A, The British Skynet and the Indonesian Palapa were supposed to be accompanied by an astronaut from the two countries.

After the Challenger disaster, the deployment of commercial satellites by the Space Shuttle was stopped, and for several years no international astronauts were nominated. Thus, neither the British nor the Indonesian payload specialists got a second chance for a spaceflight. The NASA crew however stayed together and participated in a 56-hour-long simulated mission known as STS-61-M(T) in 1987. The crew finally flew on STS-29, with Anna L. Fisher being replaced by James P. Bagian.

Skynet 4A was launched on 1 January 1990 with a Titan III, Westar-6S was renamed Galaxy-6 and launched on 12 October 1992 by an Ariane 44L. Palapa-B3 was renamed to Palapa B2P and was launched on 20 March 1987 with a Delta-3920.

== See also ==
- Cancelled Space Shuttle missions
- STS-29
