= National Intelligence Medal of Achievement =

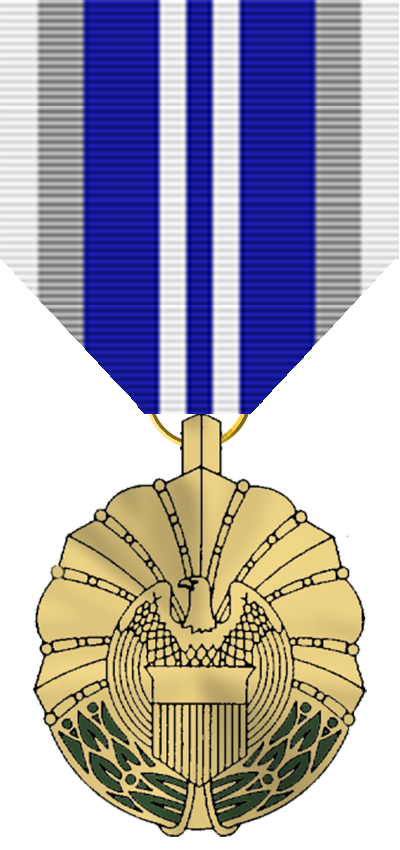
- Awarded for: "...especially meritorious conduct in the performance of outstanding service to the United States"
- Country: United States
- Presented by: the Director of Central Intelligence
- Eligibility: Members of the intelligence community
- Ribbon

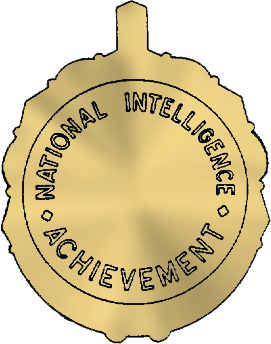
- Reverse
- Status: No longer awarded

Precedence
- Next (higher): National Intelligence Distinguished Service Medal
- Equivalent: National Intelligence Exceptional Achievement Medal
- Next (lower): National Intelligence Certificate of Distinction

The National Intelligence Medal of Achievement is an award that was presented to members of the United States Intelligence Community, both civilian and military, to recognize significant acts of service to the community as a whole. The National Intelligence Medal of Achievement was replaced with the equivalent National Intelligence Exceptional Achievement Medal, during the restructuring of the National Intelligence Community Awards (NICA) Program, with the revision of Intelligence Community Directive 655 (National Intelligence Awards Program) in 2012.

== Criteria ==
The National Intelligence Medal of Achievement was awarded by the Director of Central Intelligence and was a high enough award that it was to be presented by the Director of Central Intelligence, the Deputy Director of Central Intelligence, or if circumstance prevented presentation by those officials, it could be presented by the head of the Intelligence Community component where the recipient was assigned. The medal was presented to reward, "especially meritorious conduct in the performance of outstanding service to the United States" by personnel working in the Intelligence Community. The award recognized performance of duty with a high degree of difficulty that was clearly exceptional, but of a lesser degree than what was required for the National Intelligence Distinguished Service Medal. Eligible service had to directly relate to the Intelligence Community mission to provide intelligence required for national security policy determinations. Service that was of a benefit to a single component of the Intelligence Community was more appropriately recognized by the Legion of Merit, the CIA Intelligence Medal of Merit, or other comparable civilian departmental or agency awards. Accomplishments had to clearly benefit the Intelligence Community as a whole.

== Appearance ==
The National Intelligence Medal of Achievement is made of gold plated metal, it is 1 3/4 inches (44 mm) high by 1 3/8 inches (35 mm) wide. The obverse of the medal is of a scalloped design extending from the top of the medal down to the sides. In the center is attached a gold plated device that depicts a bald eagle on top of a shield with a solid chief and 13 vertical stripes. The reverse of the medal is gold. Circumscribed around a central disc are the words NATIONAL INTELLIGENCE at the top and ACHIEVEMENT at the bottom.

The suspension and service ribbons of the medal is ultramarine blue. It has a 1/16 inch (1.6 mm) center stripe of ultramarine blue, flanked by 3/32 inch (2.4 mm) stripes of white. At the edges are white stripes 3/32 inch (2.4 mm) in width, with silver gray stripes 3/16 inch (4.8 mm) wide toward the center.

== Notable recipients ==
- Guy S. Gardner, NASA astronaut, pilot STS-27.
- Robert L. Gibson, NASA astronaut, commander STS-27.
- Jon B.E. Hittle, Career CIA Officer and author.
- Joanne Isham, Deputy Director of National Geospatial-Intelligence Agency.
- William Lutwiniak, NSA cryptographer.
- Juanita Moody, NSA cryptographer.
- Richard M. Mullane, NASA astronaut, mission specialist STS-27.
- Jerry L. Ross, NASA astronaut, mission specialist STS-27.
- William M. Shepherd, NASA astronaut, mission specialist STS-27.
