= Victor A. Prather Award =

The Victor A. Prather Award is an award established by the American Astronautical Society "to promote understanding of high altitude environment on humans." It is awarded to "researchers, engineers and flight crew members in the field of extravehicular protection or activity in space."

The award is in honor of Victor A. Prather, a Naval flight surgeon.

== Recipients ==
Source: American Astronautical Society

- 1962 – Malcom Davis Ross
- 1963 – Col. Chuck Yeager
- 1964 – No award
- 1965 – Richard S. Johnston
- 1966 – No award
- 1967 – No award
- 1968 – Fred Forbes
- 1969 – Edward L. Hays and James V. Correale
- 1970 – Robert E. Smylie and Charles Lutz
- 1971 – Robert E. Breeding and Leonard Shepard
- 1972 – Harold I. Johnson
- 1973 – Walter Guy and Harley Stutesman, Jr.
- 1974 – Bruce McCandless II and Charles E. Whitsett, Jr.
- 1975 – David C. Schultz and Harold J. McMann
- 1976 – Larry E. Bell and Robert M. Bernarndin
- 1977 – No award
- 1978 – James W. McBarron II
- 1979 – Maurice A. Carson and Frederick A. Keune
- 1980 – No award
- 1981 – No award
- 1982 – Wilbert E. Ellis and James M. Waligora
- 1983 – No award
- 1984 – Bruce McCandless II
- 1985 – James D. van Hoften, William F. Fisher, Jerry L. Ross, and Sherwood C. Spring
- 1986 – Joseph P. Allen
- 1987 – Joseph J. Kosmo and Hubert C. Vykukal
- 1988 – Michael Brzezinski
- 1989 – No award
- 1990 – Jerry L. Ross
- 1992 – Kathryn D. Sullivan
- 1993 – STS-49 Extravehicular Crew: Thomas D. Akers, Pierre J. Thuot, Richard J. Hieb, and Kathryn C. Thornton
- 1994 – STS-61 Extravehicular Crew: F. Story Musgrave, Thomas D. Akers, Jeffrey A. Hoffman, and Kathryn C. Thornton
- 1995 – Clifford W. Hess, Scott A. Bleisath, Mark C. Lee
- 1996 – Willy Z. Sadeh
- 1997 – Alan M. Rochford
- 1998 – Guy Severin
- 1999 – Jerry L. Ross and James H. Newman
- 2000 – Michael L. Gernhardt
- 2001 – No award
- 2002 – G. Allen Flynt
- 2003 – No award
- 2004 – No award
- 2005 – No award
- 2006 – Scott Crossfield (posthumous) and David Clark (posthumous)
- 2007 – Curtis A. Stephenson
- 2008 – Joseph Kittinger
- 2009 – Joseph A. Ruseckas
- 2010 – STS-125 EVA Team
- 2011 – Joseph Kosmo
- 2012 – Jan Stepanek
- 2013 – Felix Baumgartner and the Red Bull Stratos Team

2013 - Award terminated

== See also ==
- List of engineering awards
- List of medicine awards
- List of space technology awards
