= William Lutwiniak =

American crossword creator

Lutwiniak in 1991

William Lutwiniak (November 24, 1919 – January 24, 1992) was an American crossword constructor who was also known for his work as a cryptologist with the National Security Agency. He composed a total of 8,413 puzzles; his first five thousand were composed between 1965 and 1985, as a hobby.

== Early life ==
Lutwiniak was born in Jersey City, New Jersey. Lutwiniak began solving crosswords when he was 12, and sold his first puzzle to the New York Herald-Tribune when he was 15; he later considered that this puzzle had been "a bit prophetic" because it contained the word "CRYPTOGRAPHICAL". When he was 16, he won a subscription to the journal of the American Cryptogram Association and also joined the National Puzzlers' League with the pen name "Live Devil". Over the five years that followed, he was a regular participant in the ACA's activities, which brought him to the attention of William Friedman; Friedman invited him to pursue advanced training in cryptography, and then to join the Signal Intelligence Service, which Lutwiniak did on February 1, 1941.

== Career ==
Lutwiniak worked at Arlington Hall under Solomon Kullback until the aftermath of the attack on Pearl Harbor, at which point he became concerned that he would be drafted, so he went to the Munitions Building and asked Colonel Harold Hayes for advice; Hayes told him to go to a particular recruiting station and enlist. Lutwiniak did so, and was immediately assigned to work under Harold Hayes at the Munitions Building; when he returned, Hayes promoted him to sergeant so that he could skip basic training. By the following October, he had been promoted from staff sergeant to technical sergeant.

During the war, Lutwiniak stopped creating and solving crosswords "because things were serious". In the mid-1960s, however, he found a Margaret Farrar crossword in a copy of The New York Times, and discovered that he was not able to solve it as easily as he had expected; he subsequently began selling crosswords to her. One of his early puzzles, which used cryptic crossword-style cluing such as "center of gravity" for "AVI" and "fourth of July" for "Y", was so controversial (creating, in Lutwiniak's words, a 'big uproar') that the newspaper had to subsequently print an explanation of what the clues meant.

In 1961, he headed the NSA's A5 unit, which specialized in Soviet codes. Later, he became the publisher of Cryptolog, one of the NSA's internal magazines, to which he also contributed articles and puzzles.

In 1985, he joined The Washington Post as crossword co-editor for their Sunday magazine, and became more involved in crossword culture; in 1987, he attended a Stanley Newman-run crossword tournament in Baltimore, and created a 15-by-15 puzzle on stage, in 15 minutes, based on suggestions from the audience.

== Awards and honors ==
Upon retiring from the National Security Agency in 1981, Lutwiniak was awarded the National Intelligence Medal of Achievement.

In 1991, CROSSW RD Magazine named him Crossword Puzzle Person of the Year.
