= STS-62-A =

Canceled Space Shuttle mission

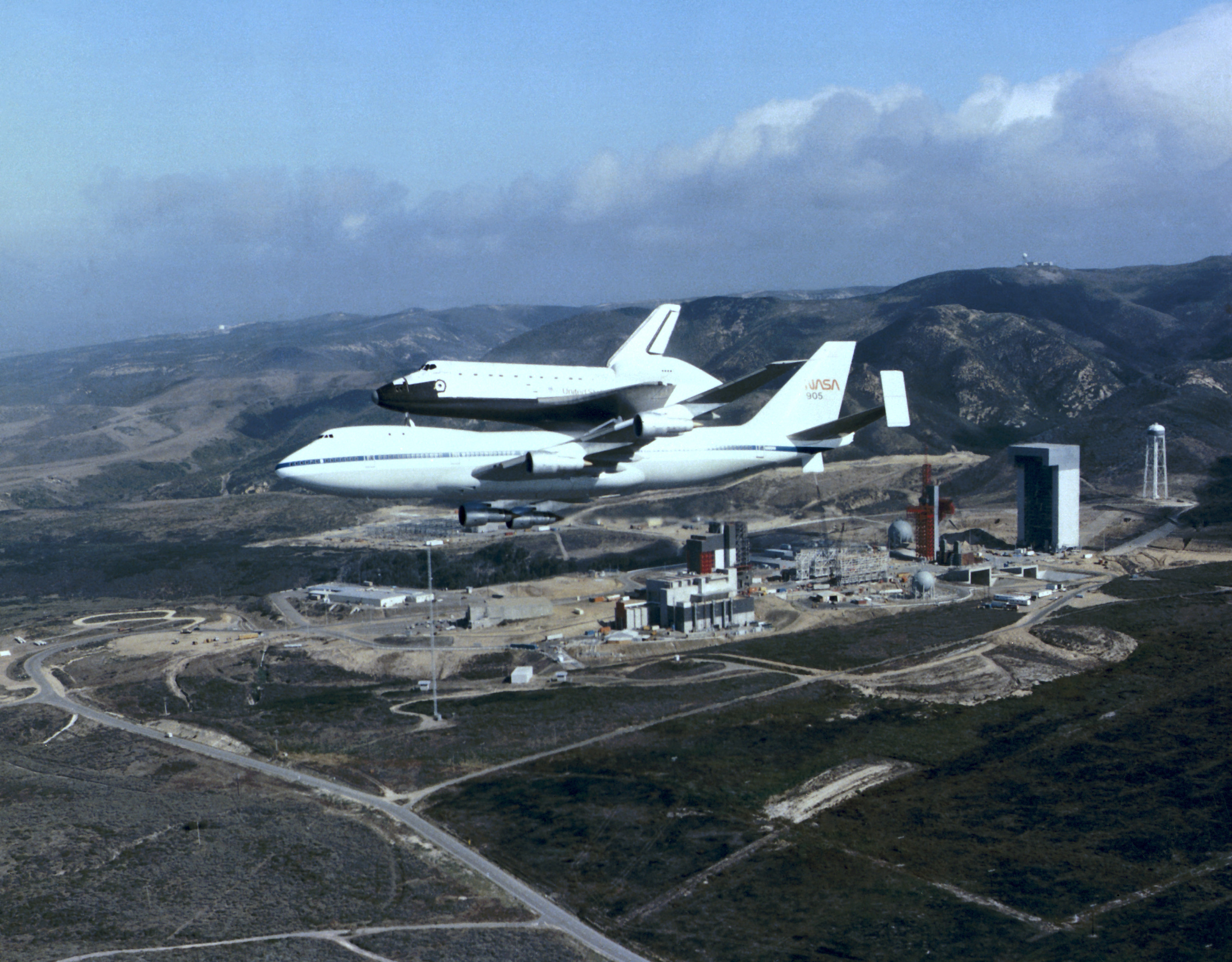
- Space Shuttle Discovery atop Shuttle Carrier Aircraft 905, flies over Vandenberg Space Launch Complex 6 in November 1984, for testing of infrastructure at the base ahead of the mission
- Names: Space Transportation System
- Mission type: DoD satellite deployment (planned)
- Operator: NASA

Spacecraft properties
- Spacecraft: Space Shuttle Discovery (planned)

Crew
- Crew size: 7
- Members: Robert L. Crippen; Guy S. Gardner; Richard M. Mullane; Jerry L. Ross; Dale A. Gardner; Edward C. Aldridge Jr.; Brett Watterson

Start of mission
- Launch date: July 15, 1986 (planned, not launched)
- Rocket: Space Shuttle Discovery
- Launch site: Vandenberg, SLC-6
- Contractor: Rockwell International

End of mission
- Landing date: July 19, 1986 (planned)
- Landing site: Vandenberg, Runway 12/30

Orbital parameters
- Reference system: Geocentric orbit (planned)
- Regime: Low Earth orbit
- Perigee altitude: 312 km (194 mi)
- Apogee altitude: 320 km (200 mi)
- Inclination: 48.45°
- Period: 90.90 minutes
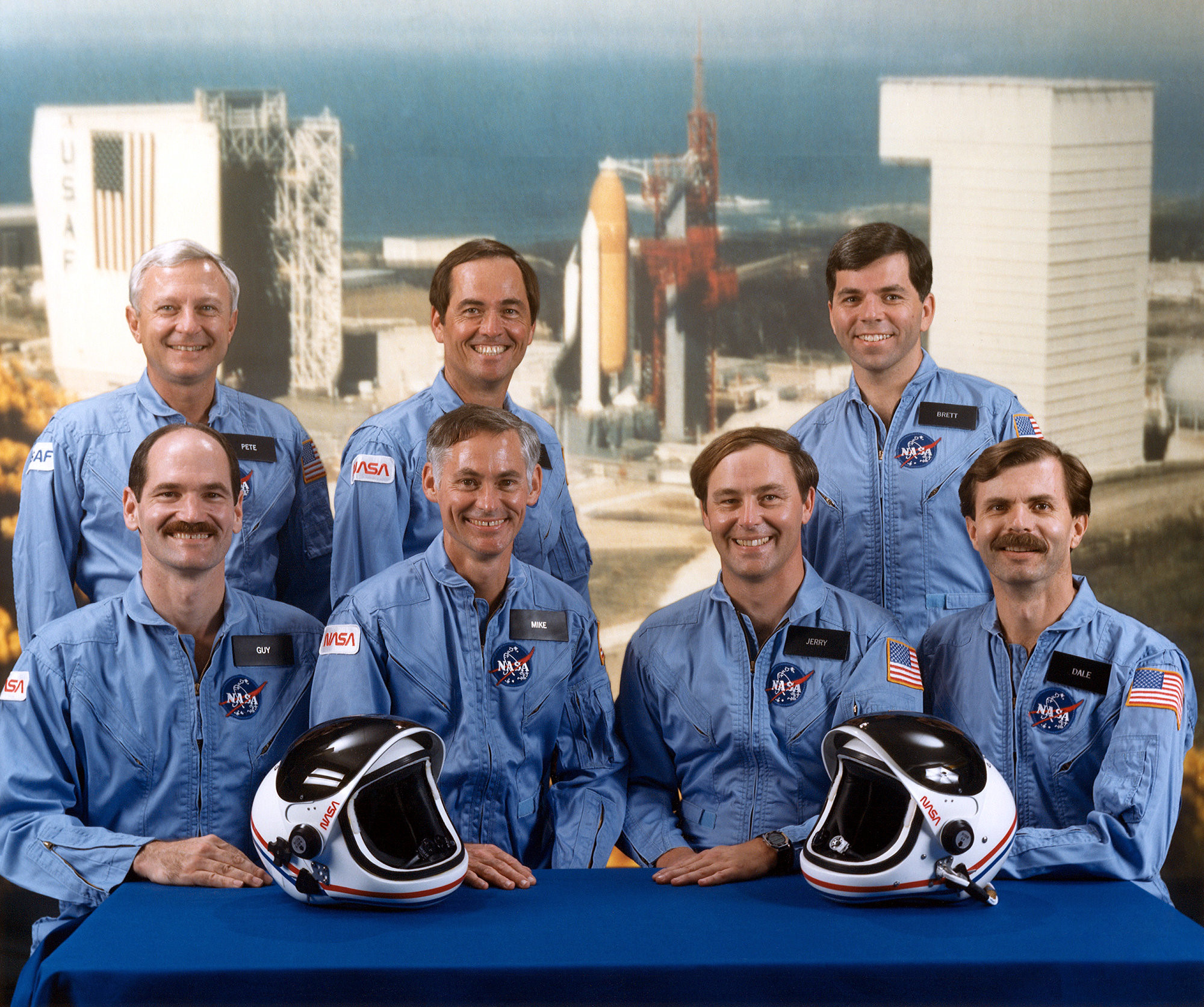
- Back row: Aldridge, Crippen and Watterson; Front row: G. Gardner, Mullane, Ross and D. Gardner Space Shuttle program Cancelled Shuttle missions

STS-62-A was a planned NASA Space Shuttle mission to deliver a reconnaissance payload (Teal Ruby) into polar orbit. It was expected to use Discovery. It would have been the first crewed launch from Vandenberg Air Force Base in California, and the first crewed mission to go into polar orbit.

The mission designation, STS-62-A, meant: 6=fiscal year 1986, 2=Vandenberg (1=Kennedy Space Center), and A=first flight from that launch site in that fiscal year.

== Crew ==
Position	Astronaut
Commander	Robert L. Crippen; Would have been fifth space mission
Pilot	Guy S. Gardner; Would have been first space mission
Mission Specialist 1	Richard M. Mullane; Would have been second space mission
Mission Specialist 2	Jerry L. Ross; Would have been second space mission
Mission Specialist 3	Dale A. Gardner; Would have been third space mission
Payload Specialist 1	Edward C. Aldridge Jr. Would have been first space mission
Payload Specialist 2	Brett Watterson, MSE; Would have been first space mission

== Post-Challenger accident ==
The destruction of Challenger and subsequent halt of the Space Shuttle program led to the cancellation of the mission.

Guy Gardner, Jerry Ross, and Mike Mullane were members of the second post-Challenger mission STS-27 — a classified mission for the DoD — during which the Lacrosse-1 radar reconnaissance spacecraft was allegedly deployed.
