= Riding Rockets =

Memoir by astronaut Mike Mullane

Riding Rockets: The Outrageous Tales of a Space Shuttle Astronaut
- Author: Mike Mullane
- Subject: NASA astronaut corps
- Genre: memoir
- Published: 2006 (Scribner)
- ISBN: 0-7432-7682-5

Riding Rockets: The Outrageous Tales of a Space Shuttle Astronaut is a 2006 book by retired astronaut Richard "Mike" Mullane. The book describes Mullane's experiences in the NASA astronaut corps from 1978 to 1990, including his flights on the Space Shuttle and his personal relationships with other astronauts, especially Judy Resnik, who perished in the Challenger accident. The book gives a critical glimpse into the culture of NASA and the astronaut corps. The Publishers Weekly review of the book noted that Mullane "holds female astronauts in special disregard". Kirkus Reviews summarized the book as "one astronaut’s messy, exhilarating story, with no edges sanded off".
