= Mike Mullane =

American aerospace and weapons engineer and astronaut (born 1945)

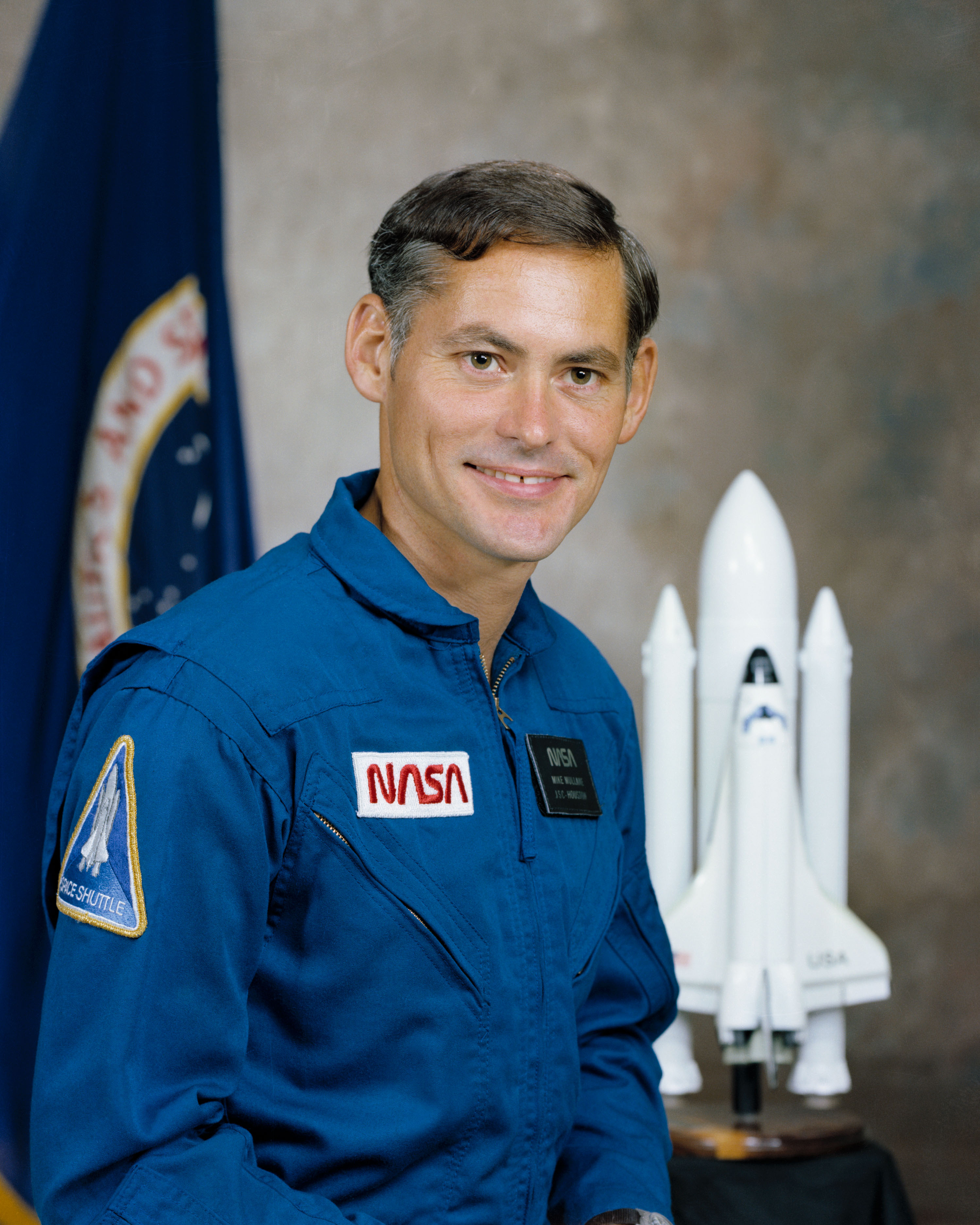
- Born: Richard Michael Mullane; September 10, 1945 (age 81); Wichita Falls, Texas, U.S.
- Education: United States Military Academy (BS); Air University (MS)
- Space career

NASA astronaut
- Rank: Colonel, USAF
- Time in space: 14d 20h 20m
- Selection: NASA Group 8 (1978)
- Missions: STS-41-D; STS-27; STS-36

Richard Michael Mullane (born September 10, 1945; Col, USAF, Ret.) is an engineer and weapon systems officer, a retired USAF officer, and a former NASA astronaut. During his career, he flew as a mission specialist on STS-41-D, STS-27, and STS-36.

== Early life and education ==
Richard Michael Mullane was born September 10, 1945, in Wichita Falls, Texas. At the time of his birth, his father, Hugh, was serving as a flight engineer on a B-17 in the Pacific War. His family moved regularly until his father was diagnosed with polio and lost the use of his legs, causing the family to move to Albuquerque, New Mexico. He was a Second Class Scout in the Boy Scouts of America. He graduated from St. Pius X High School, Albuquerque, New Mexico, in 1963, then received a Bachelor of Science degree in military engineering from the United States Military Academy in 1967 and was awarded a Master of Science degree in aeronautical engineering from the U.S. Air Force Institute of Technology in 1975.

== Air Force career ==
Mullane, an air force colonel, graduated from West Point in 1967. He completed 134 combat missions as an RF-4C weapon systems officer while stationed at Tan Son Nhut Air Base, Vietnam, from January to November 1969. He subsequently served a 4-year tour of duty, in England. In July 1976, upon completing the USAF Flight Test Engineer Course at Edwards Air Force Base, California, he was assigned as a flight test weapon systems officer to the 3246th Test Wing at Eglin Air Force Base, Florida.

== NASA career ==
Selected by NASA in January 1978, Mullane became an astronaut in August 1979. He flew on three Space Shuttle missions, serving as a mission specialist on the crew of STS-41-D in August 1984, on STS-27 in December 1988, and on STS-36 in March 1990.

On his first mission Mullane served as a mission specialist on the crew of STS-41-D, which launched from Kennedy Space Center, Florida, on August 30, 1984. This was the maiden flight of the Orbiter Discovery. During this seven-day mission the crew successfully activated the OAST-1 solar cell wing experiment, deployed three satellites, operated the CFES-III experiment, the student crystal growth experiment, and photography experiments using the IMAX motion picture camera. STS 41-D completed 96 orbits of the Earth in 145 hours before landing at Edwards Air Force Base, California, on September 5, 1984.

Mullane then was assigned to STS-62-A, the first Shuttle mission scheduled to launch from Vandenberg Air Force Base, but the mission was canceled after the Space Shuttle Challenger disaster. After the Shuttle returned to service, he flew aboard the Orbiter Atlantis, on STS-27, which launched from Kennedy Space Center, Florida, on December 2, 1988. The mission carried a Department of Defense (DOD) payload, as well as a number of secondary payloads. After 68 orbits of the earth, the mission concluded with a dry lakebed landing on Runway 17 at Edwards Air Force Base, California, on December 6, 1988. Mission duration was 105 hours. The mission is noteworthy due to the severe damage Atlantis sustained to its critical heat-resistant tiles during ascent.

On his third flight, Mullane served on the crew of STS-36, which launched from the Kennedy Space Center, Florida, on February 28, 1990, aboard the Space Shuttle Atlantis. This mission carried DOD payloads and a number of secondary payloads. After 72 orbits of the earth, the STS-36 mission concluded with a lakebed landing at Edwards Air Force Base, California, on March 4, 1990.

With the completion of his third flight, Mullane logged a total of 356 hours in space. He retired from NASA and the Air Force July 1, 1990.

== Post-NASA career ==
In 2006, Mullane published an autobiography, Riding Rockets: The Outrageous Tales of a Space Shuttle Astronaut, that details his life before and during the space program, and expresses critical views towards the culture of the NASA Astronaut Corps. Mullane appeared on the United States television show The Daily Show with Jon Stewart on Monday, February 13, 2006, to promote his book.

== Awards and honors ==
- Air Medals (6)
- Air Force Distinguished Flying Cross
- Meritorious Service Medal
- Vietnam Campaign Medal
- National Defense Service Medal
- Vietnam Service Medal
- Air Force Commendation Medal
- NASA Space Flight Medals
- National Intelligence Medal of Achievement
- Distinguished Graduate of the USAF Navigator Training School (and recipient of its Commander's Trophy), the USAF Institute of Technology, and the USAF Test Pilot School.

He is a member of the Air Force Association and a member of the Leadership Board of For All Moonkind, Inc.

== Bibliography ==
- Riding Rockets: The Outrageous Tales of a Space Shuttle Astronaut. Publisher: Scribner. ISBN 0-7432-7682-5
- Red Sky: A Novel of Love, Space, & War. (1993 technothriller/hard sf novel) Publisher: Northwest Publishing. ISBN 1-56901-111-7
- Do Your Ears Pop in Space and 500 Other Surprising Questions about Space Travel. Publisher: Wiley. ISBN 0-471-15404-0
- Liftoff!: An Astronaut's Dream. Publisher: Silver Burdett Press. ISBN 0-382-24664-0
