= Guy Gardner (astronaut) =

American astronaut (born 1948)

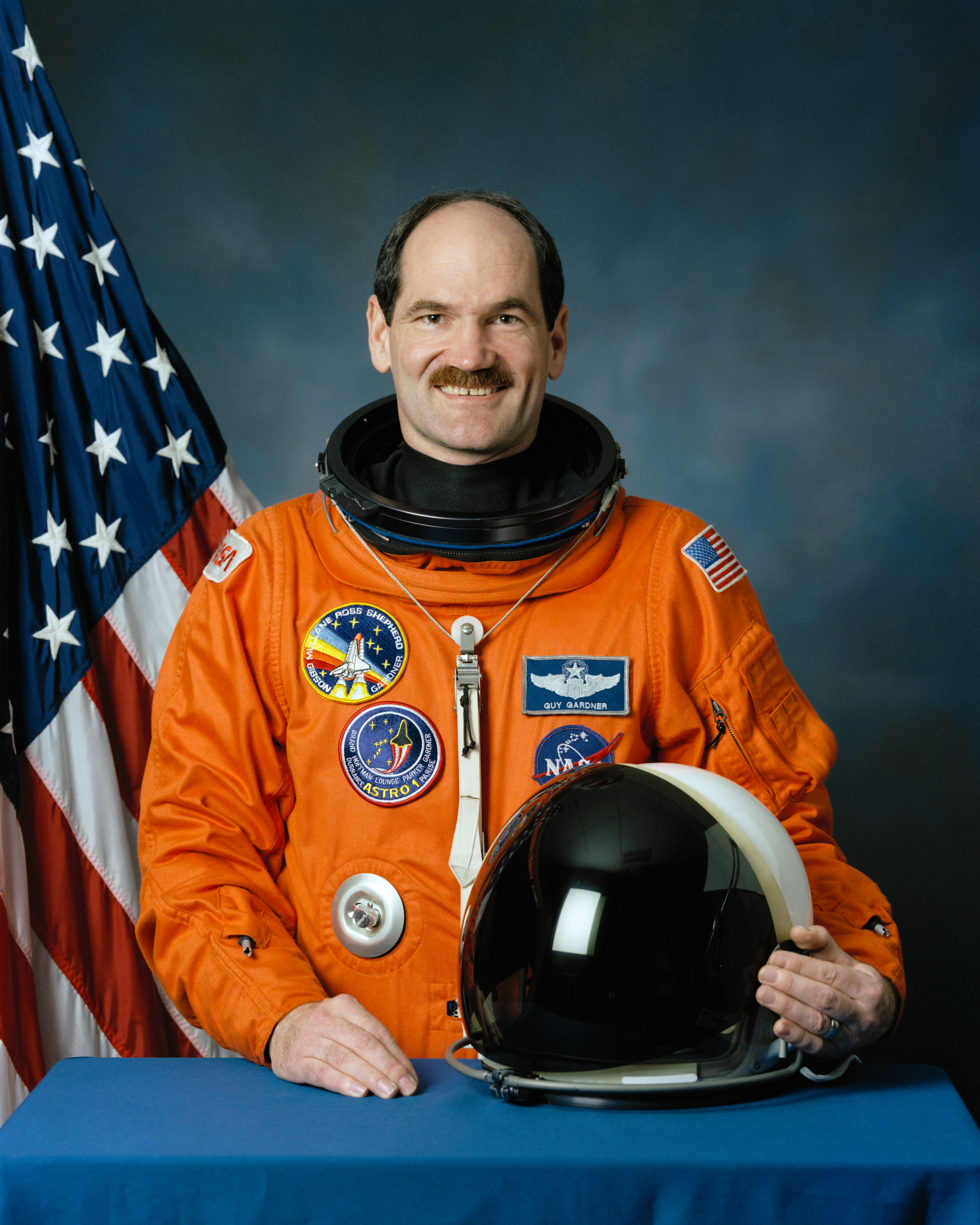
- Born: Guy Spence Gardner; January 6, 1948 (age 78); Altavista, Virginia, U.S.
- Education: United States Air Force Academy (BS); Purdue University (MS)
- Space career

NASA astronaut
- Rank: Colonel, USAF
- Time in space: 13d 8h 10m
- Selection: NASA Group 9 (1980)
- Missions: STS-27; STS-35

Guy Spence Gardner (born January 6, 1948) is a United States Air Force officer and a former astronaut. He holds the rank of colonel. He flew as pilot on two Space Shuttle missions, STS-27 and STS-35. Gardner was also the 12th president of the Williamson College of the Trades.

== Background and education ==
Gardner was born on January 6, 1948, in Altavista, Virginia, and grew up in Alexandria, Virginia. He was active in the Boy Scouts of America where he achieved its second-highest rank, Life Scout. He graduated from George Washington High School in Alexandria, Virginia in 1965; received a Bachelor of Science degree with majors in Astronautics, Mathematics, and Engineering Sciences from the United States Air Force Academy in 1969 and a Master of Science degree in Astronautics from Purdue University in 1970.

== Military experience ==
Gardner completed U.S. Air Force pilot training at Craig Air Force Base, Alabama, and F-4 Phantom II upgrade training at MacDill Air Force Base, Florida in 1971. In 1972, he flew 177 combat missions in Southeast Asia while stationed in Udon Thani, Thailand. In 1973–74, he was an F-4 instructor and operational pilot at Seymour Johnson Air Force Base, North Carolina. He attended the USAF Test Pilot School at Edwards Air Force Base, California, in 1975, and served as a test pilot at Edwards in 1976. In 1977–78, he was an instructor test pilot at the USAF Test Pilot School. In 1979–1980, he was operations officer of the 1st Test Squadron at Clark Air Base, Philippines.

== NASA and FAA experience ==
Gardner was selected as a pilot astronaut by NASA in May 1980. During his 11 years as an astronaut, he worked in many areas of Space Shuttle and Space Station development and support. In 1984, he was assigned as pilot on STS-62-A, the first Space Shuttle mission to launch from Vandenberg AFB, California. That mission was later canceled.

Gardner first flew in space as pilot on the crew of STS-27, aboard the Space Shuttle Atlantis, on December 2–6, 1988. The mission carried a Department of Defense payload and is noteworthy due to the severe damage Atlantis sustained to its critical heat-resistant tiles during ascent. Gardner next flew as pilot on the crew of STS-35, aboard the Space Shuttle Columbia, on December 2–10, 1990. The mission carried the ASTRO-1 astronomy laboratory consisting of three ultraviolet telescopes and one x-ray telescope.

Gardner left NASA in June 1991 to command the USAF Test Pilot School at Edwards Air Force Base, California. In August 1992, Gardner retired from the Air Force and returned to NASA to direct the joint U.S. and Russian Shuttle-Mir Program.

In 1995, Gardner joined the Federal Aviation Administration as Director of the William J. Hughes Technical Center, at the Atlantic City Int'l Airport, in New Jersey. He then moved to FAA Headquarters in 1996 as the Associate Administrator for Regulation and Certification (now Aviation Safety), leading the government organization responsible for oversight and regulation of civil aviation safety.

== Post-government service ==
Gardner engaged in several education related activities in the years after completing U.S. Government service. He served in various teaching positions in Fairfax County, Virginia. In 2004 he returned to Purdue University to manage research programs. Between 2006 and 2009, he was superintendent of the Riverside Military Academy. From 2009 to 2013, he served as the President of the Williamson College of the Trades.

== Awards and honors ==
=== Decorations and medals ===
- Defense Distinguished Service Medal
- Defense Superior Service Medal
- Legion of Merit, with one oak leaf cluster
- Distinguished Flying Cross with two oak leaf clusters
- Air Medal with 13 oak leaf clusters
- National Intelligence Medal of Achievement
- National Defense Service Medal with star
- Vietnam Service Medal
- NASA Spaceflight Medal
- Republic of Vietnam Campaign Medal

Gardner was a distinguished graduate of the USAF Academy, the top graduate in pilot training, and the top graduate from the USAF Test Pilot School. He has been awarded the Test Pilot School Outstanding Academic Instructor, the Test Pilot School Outstanding Flying Instructor, and the Distinguished Astronaut Engineering Alumnus award of Purdue University.
