= Joanne O. Isham =

US espionage and security expert

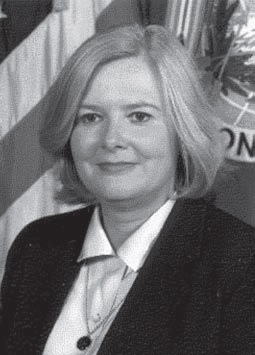
Joanne Isham

Joanne O'Rourke Isham is an espionage and security expert from the United States. She is a former member of the Central Intelligence Agency (CIA) and currently involved in geospatial intelligence.

== Biography ==
Isham graduated from the University of Notre Dame in the mid 1970s. She started working in the Central Intelligence Agency (CIA) at the age of 20 doing background checks. Isham was Director of Congressional Affairs at the CIA during the Aldrich Ames spy case, Associate Deputy Director for the CIA's Directorate for Science and Technology, and Deputy Director of National Geospatial-Intelligence Agency from November 2003 to April 2006. In addition, she was the Deputy Director of National Imagery and Mapping Agency from September 2001 to October 2003.

Isham retired from the CIA in 2006 as a member of the Senior Intelligence Service, and a career officer at the Central Intelligence Agency, which she had joined in 1977.

In August 2017, she joined defense technology firm Polaris Alpha's advisory board.

== Accolades ==
Isham was awarded CIA's Distinguished Intelligence Medal by Director John Deutch on March 18, 1995; in recognition for her outstanding leadership and management of the Office of Congressional Affairs.

She was awarded the National Intelligence Medal of Achievement. She also received the Director’s Award in recognition of extraordinary service.
