= Jerry L. Ross =

NASA astronaut and engineer (born 1948)

Jerry Ross
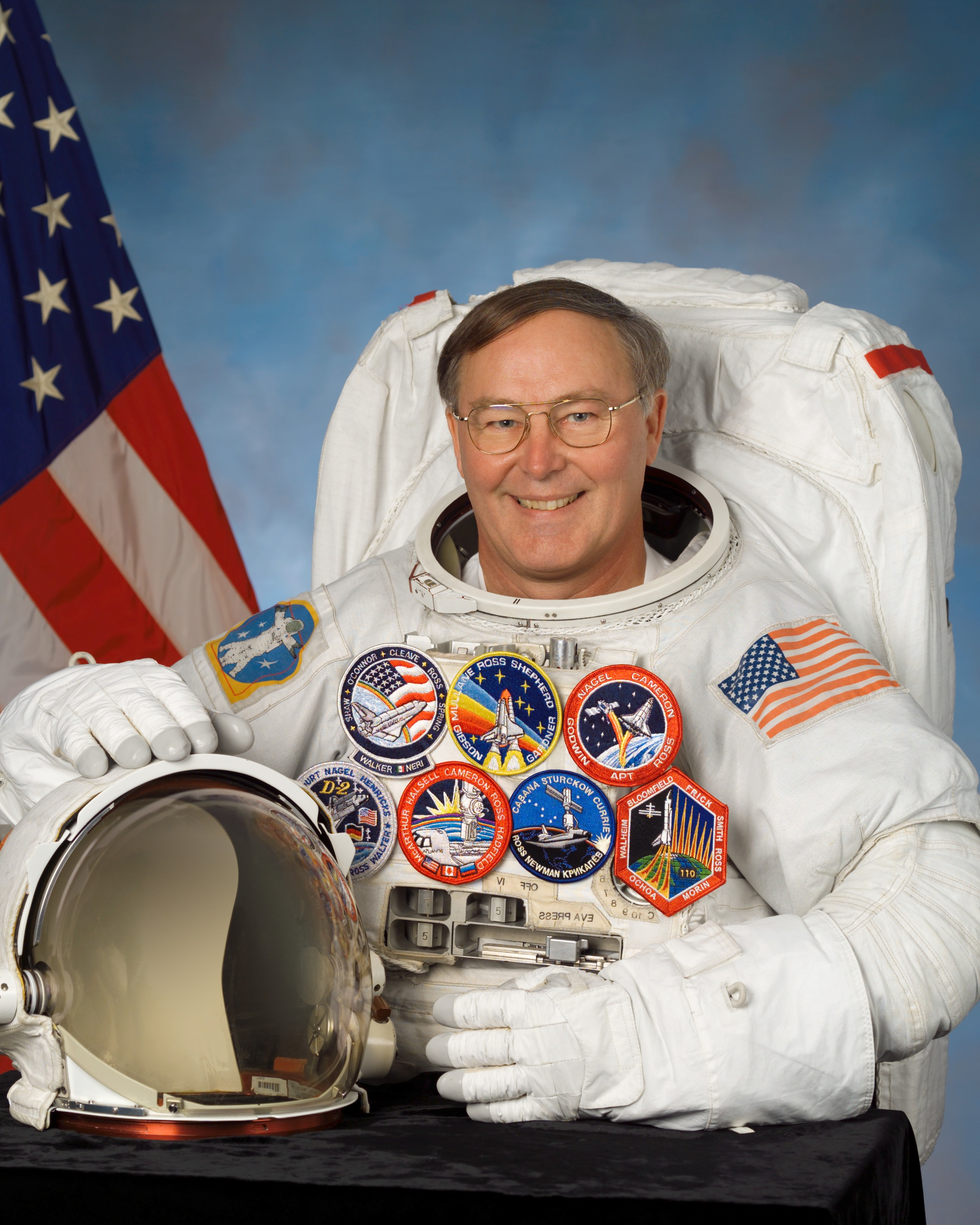
- EVA portrait, c. 2002
- Born: Jerry Lynn Ross; January 20, 1948 (age 78); Crown Point, Indiana, U.S.
- Education: Purdue University (BS, MS)
- Space career

NASA astronaut
- Rank: Colonel, USAF
- Time in space: 58d 0h 52m
- Selection: NASA Group 9 (1980)
- Total EVAs: 9
- Total EVA time: 57h 55m
- Missions: STS-61-B; STS-27; STS-37; STS-55; STS-74; STS-88; STS-110
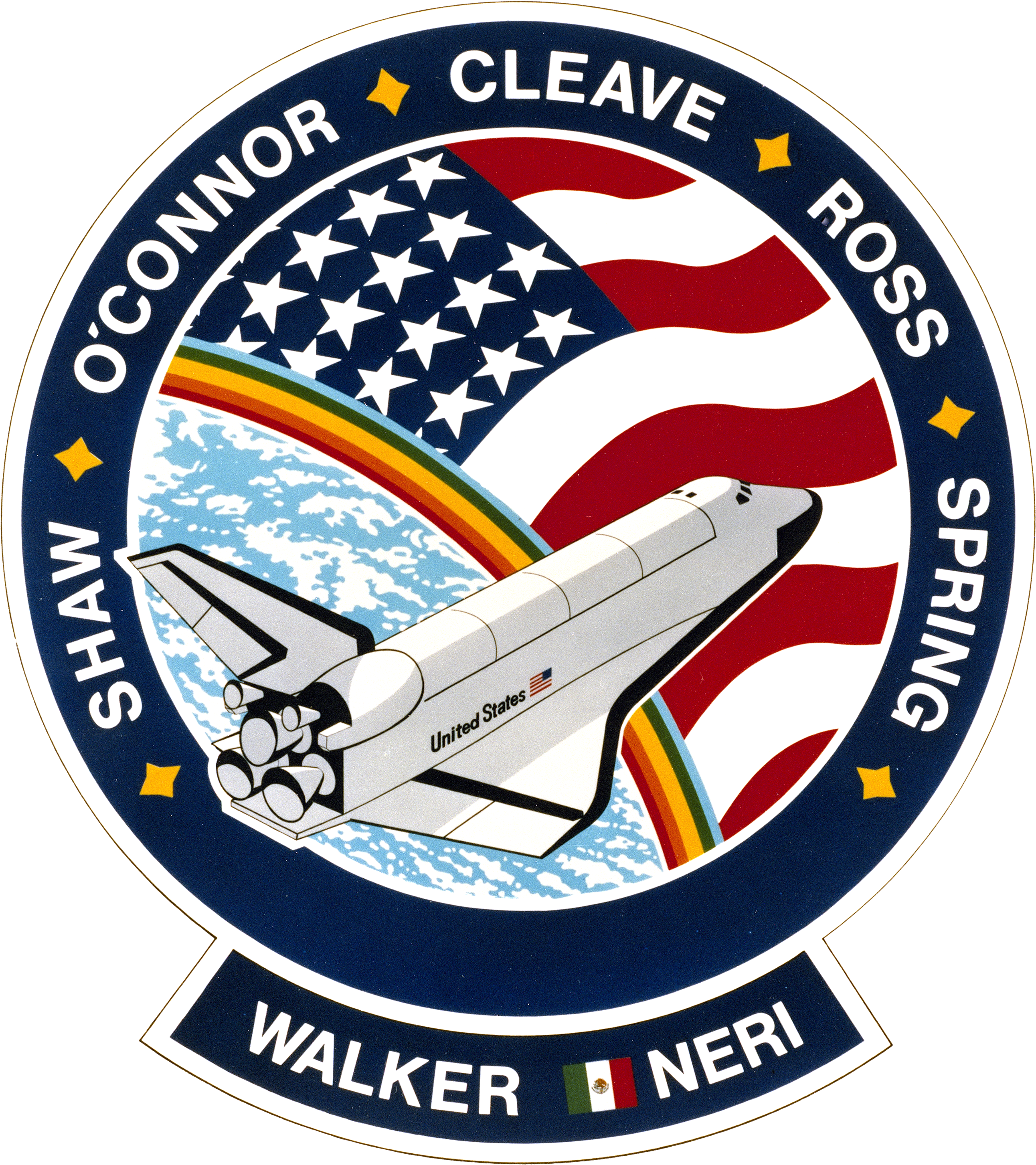
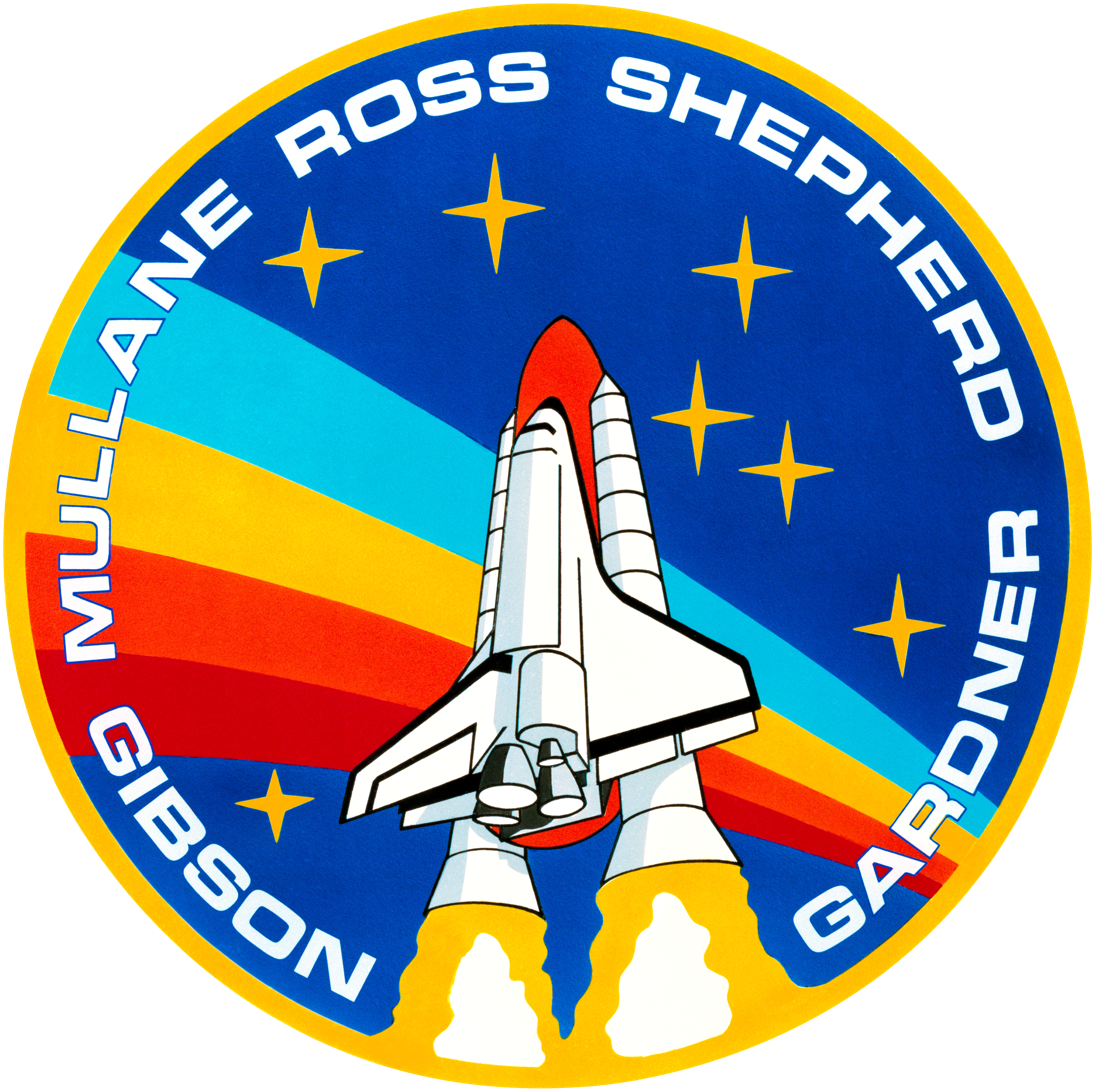
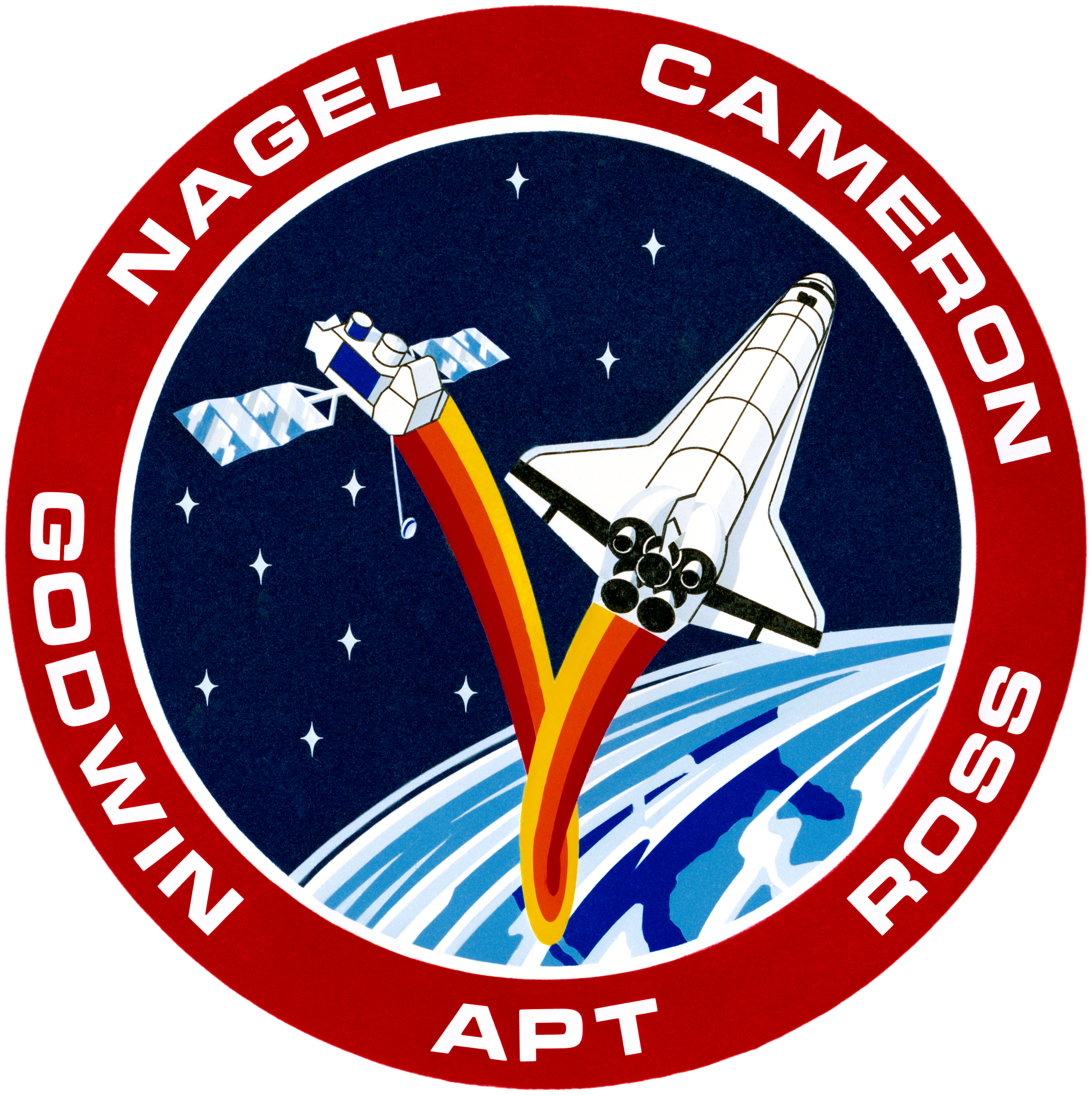
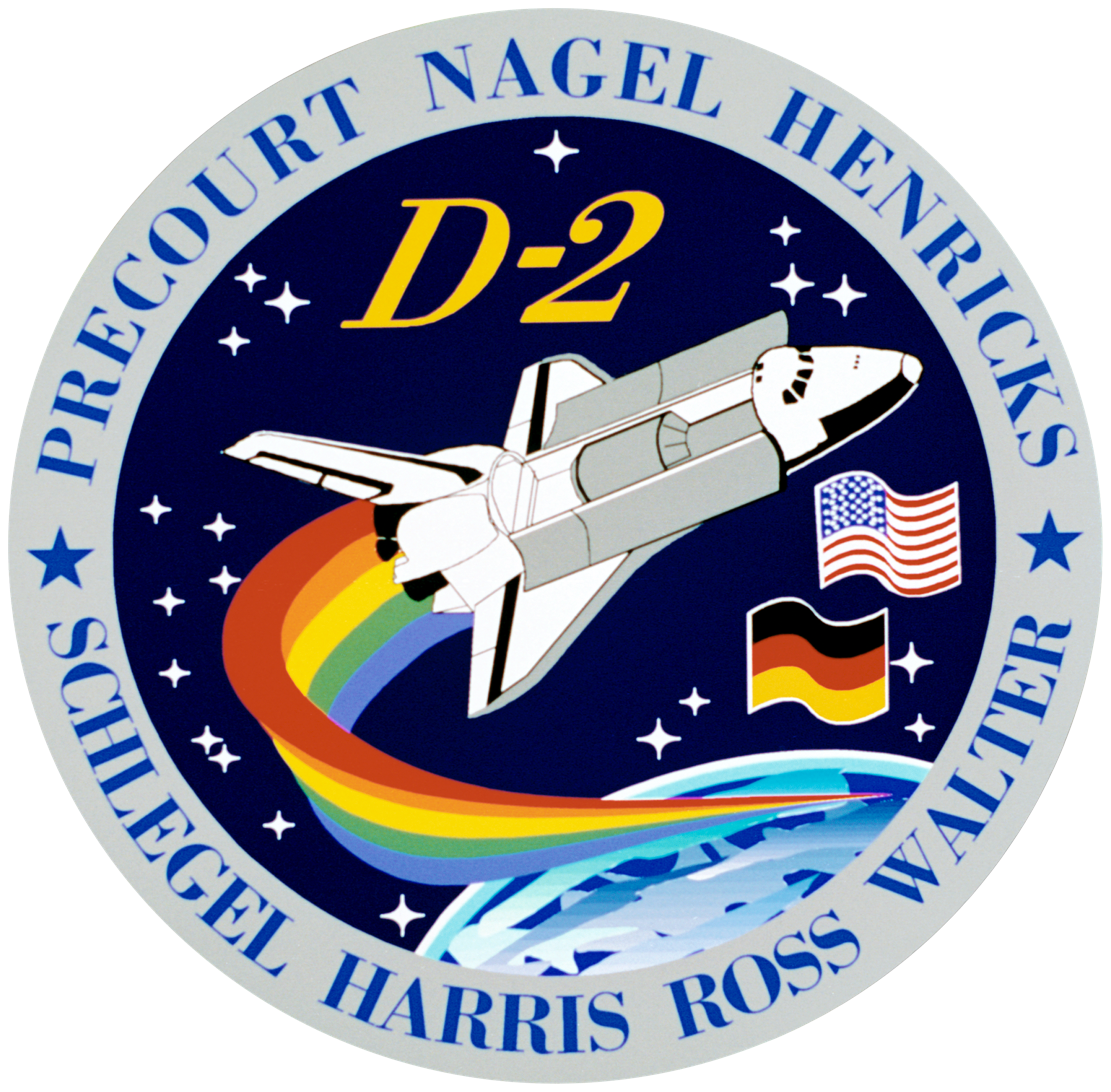
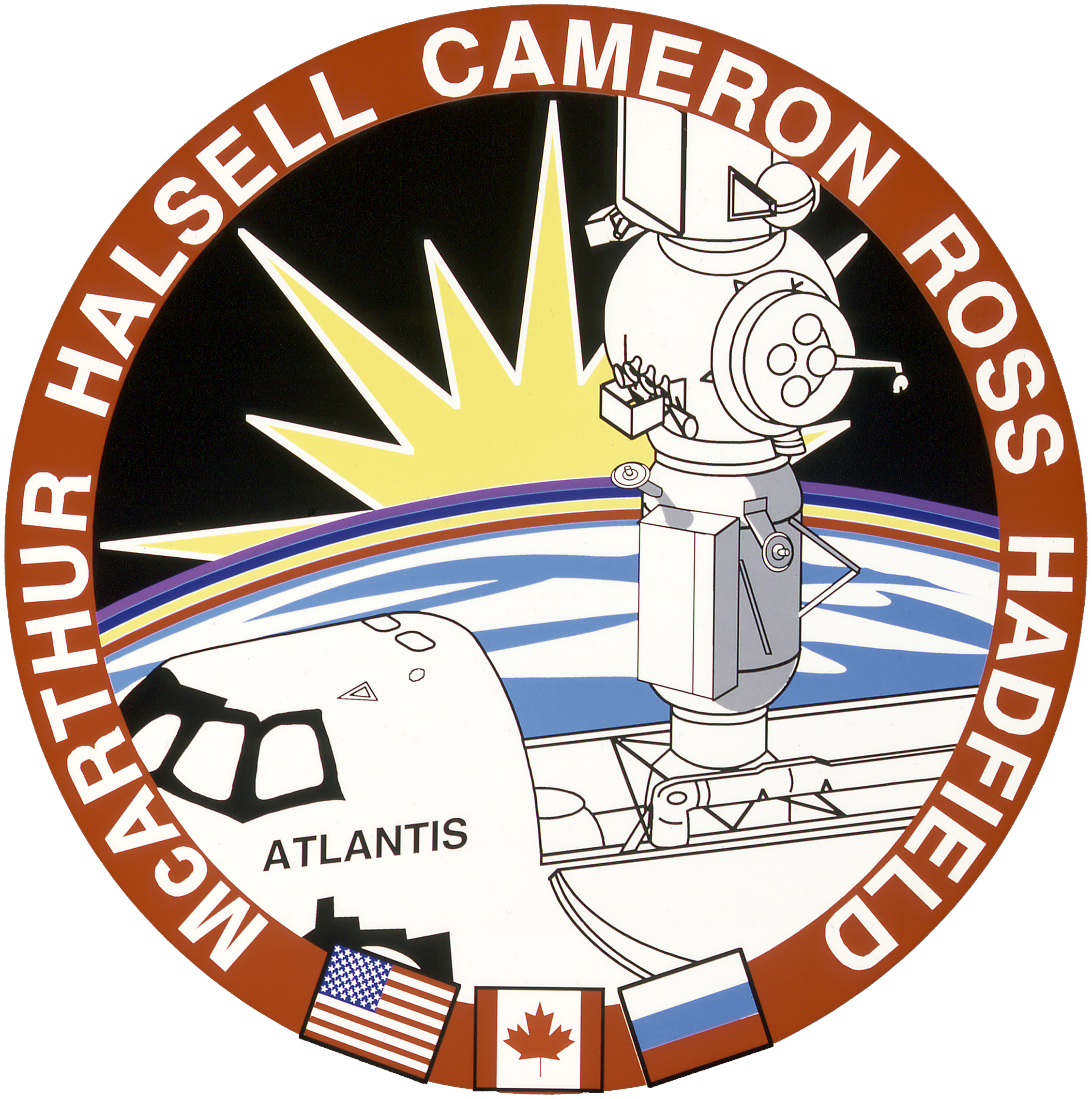
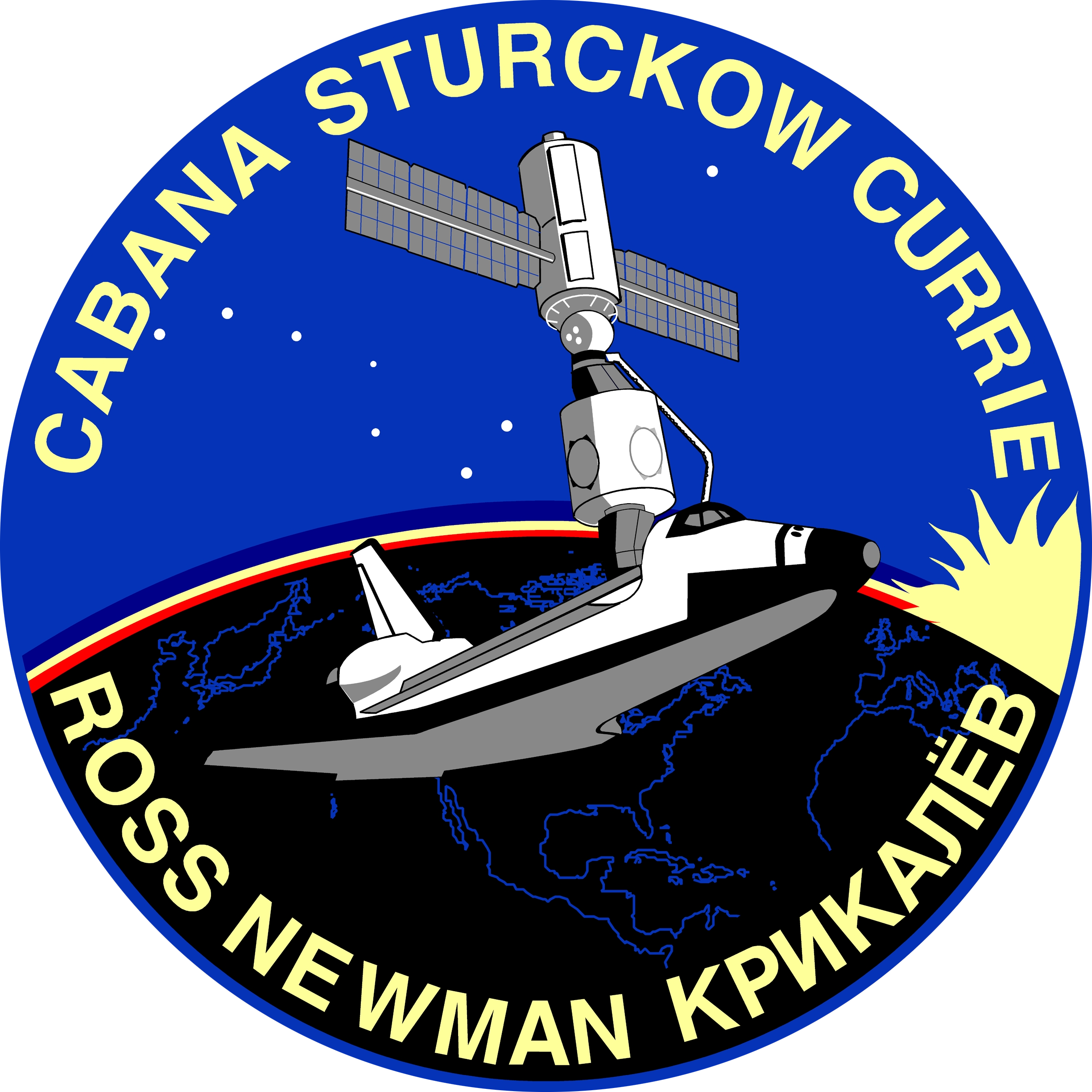
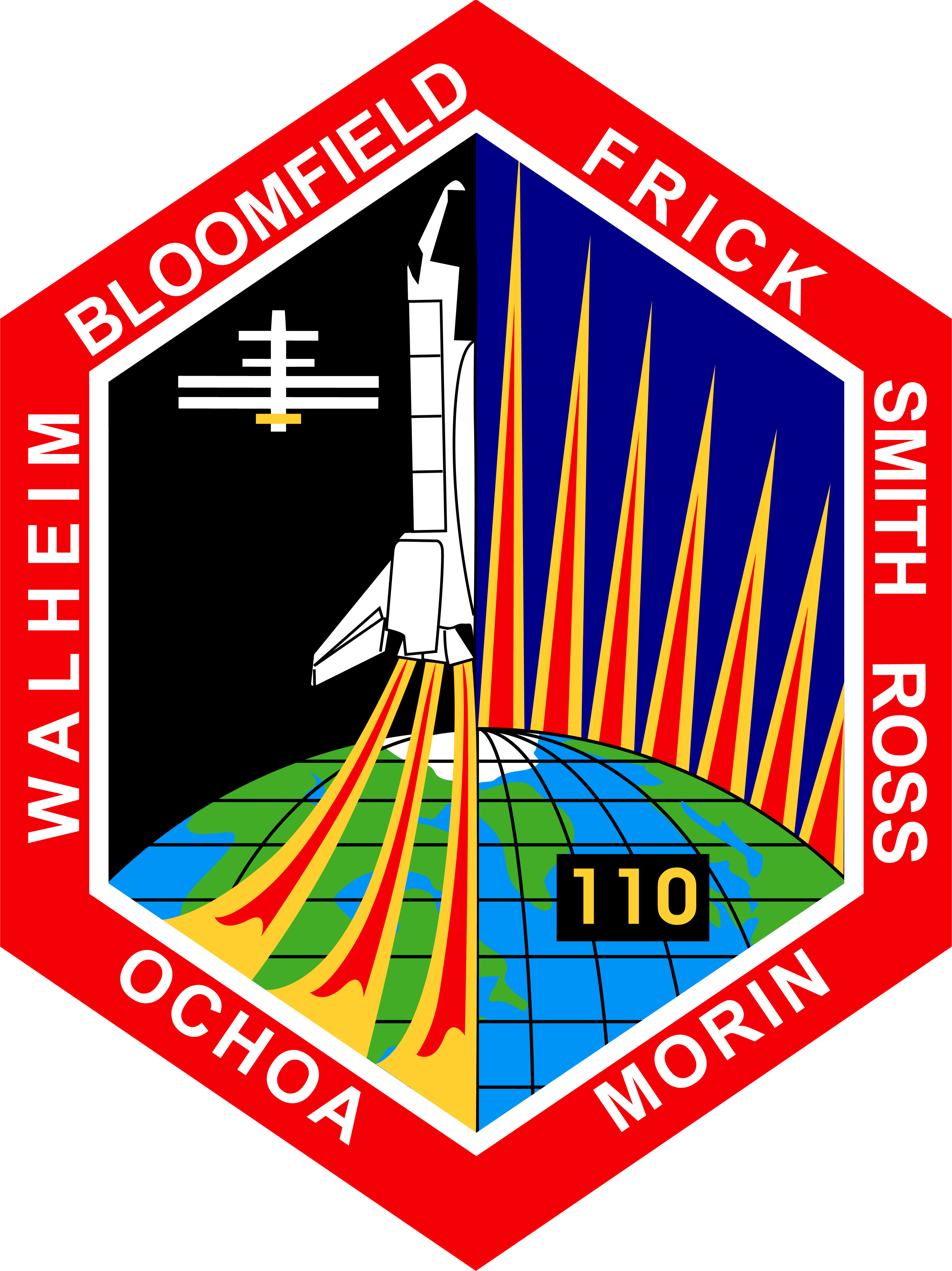
- Mission insignia

Jerry Lynn Ross (born January 20, 1948, Crown Point, Indiana) is a retired United States Air Force officer, engineer, and a former NASA astronaut. Ross is a veteran of seven Space Shuttle missions, making him the joint record holder for most spaceflights (a record he shares with Franklin Chang-Díaz).

His papers, photographs, and many personal items are in the Barron Hilton Flight and Space Exploration Archives at Purdue University. He was inducted into the Astronaut Hall of Fame during ceremonies in May 2014.

Ross is the author of Spacewalker: My Journey in Space and Faith as NASA's Record-Setting Frequent Flyer (Purdue University Press, 2013) with John Norberg. In March 2014, it was announced Spacewalker would be available in a French translation through the specialist aerospace publisher, Altipresse.

Fellow astronaut, Chris Hadfield, describes Ross in his 2013 autobiography, An Astronaut's Guide to Life on Earth, as "the embodiment of the trustworthy, loyal, courteous and brave astronaut archetype."

== Education ==
Ross graduated from Crown Point High School, Crown Point, Indiana, in 1966. He received a Bachelor of Science in 1970 and a Master of Science degree in 1972, both in mechanical engineering from Purdue University. At Purdue, he joined the Purdue Reamer Club.

== Military career ==
Ross, an Air Force ROTC student at Purdue University, received his commission upon graduation in 1970. After receiving his master's degree from Purdue in 1972, he entered active duty with the Air Force and was assigned to the Ramjet Engine Division of Air Force Aero-Propulsion Laboratory at Wright-Patterson Air Force Base, in Ohio. He conducted computer-aided design studies on ramjet propulsion systems, served as the project engineer for captive tests of a supersonic ramjet missile using a rocket sled track, and as the project manager for preliminary configuration development of the ASALM strategic air-launched missile.

From June 1974 to July 1975, he was the Laboratory Executive Officer and Chief of the Management Operations Office. Ross graduated from the USAF Test Pilot School’s Flight Test Engineer Course in 1976 and subsequently was assigned to the 6510th Test Wing at Edwards Air Force Base, California. While on assignment to the 6510th’s Flight Test Engineering Directorate, he was project engineer on a limited flying qualities evaluation of the RC-135S aircraft, and, as lead B-1 flying qualities flight test engineer, was responsible for the stability, control, and flight control system testing performance on the B-1 aircraft. As chief B-1 flight test engineer, he was also responsible for training and supervising all Air Force B-1 flight test engineer crew members and for performing the mission planning for the B-1 offensive avionics test aircraft.

Ross has flown in 21 different types of aircraft, holds a private pilot's license, and has logged over 3,900 flying hours, the majority in military aircraft. He retired from the Air Force on March 31, 2000.

== NASA career ==
In February 1979, Ross was assigned to the Payload Operations Division at the Lyndon B. Johnson Space Center, as a payload officer/flight controller who was responsible for the flight operations integration of payloads into the Space Shuttle. Ross was selected as an astronaut in May 1980. His technical assignments since then have included EVA, or "space walks", RMS (Remote Manipulator System, or "robotic arm"), and chase team; support crewman for STS 41-B, STS 41-C and STS 51-A; spacecraft communicator (CAPCOM) during STS 41-B, STS 41-C, STS 41-D, STS 51-A and STS 51-D; Chief of the Mission Support Branch; member of the 1990 Astronaut Selection Board; Acting Deputy Chief of the Astronaut Office, Chief of the Astronaut Office EVA and Robotics Branch, and Astronaut Office Branch Chief for Kennedy Space Center Operations Support. Ross was assigned to STS-62-A, the first Shuttle mission to launch from Vandenberg Air Force Base, but the mission was canceled after the Space Shuttle Challenger disaster.

Ross flew as a mission specialist on STS 61-B (1985), STS-27 (1988) and STS-37 (1991), was the Payload Commander on STS-55/Spacelab-D2 (1993), and again served as a mission specialist on the second Space Shuttle to rendezvous and dock with the Russian Space Station Mir, STS-74 (1995), the first International Space Station assembly mission, STS-88 (1998) and STS-110 (2002). A veteran of 7 space flights, Ross has over 1,393 hours in space, including 57 hours and 55 minutes on 9 EVAs. (see below)

In addition to his record number of launches, among his many personal milestones, Ross held the U.S. record for spacewalks (9) until that was surpassed by the current record holder, ISS Expedition 14 commander Michael Lopez-Alegria (10 EVA's totaling 67 hours and 40 minutes). However, there is speculation that on STS-27 (1988), Ross made an additional EVA. This shuttle mission was a classified DoD satellite launch and therefore information about the flight has never been released. Ross also holds the record for most flights on a single Space Shuttle orbiter (Atlantis) at five.

In 2013 John Norberg, who worked with Ross on his book, filed a Freedom of Information Act concerning STS-27 with the National Reconnaissance Office. The NRO confirmed it had control of the records and declined to release any information about the flight. Ross has never commented on the objectives or his work on STS-27. Ross officially ranks third in the world for spacewalks behind Russian Anatoly Solovyev (16) and Lopez-Alegria.

Ross served as Chief of the Vehicle Integration Test Office at the Johnson Space Center in Houston, Texas until he retired in January 2012.

Ross retired from NASA on January 28, 2012, after being the first person to launch into space 7 times. He also leaves NASA after placing third in the most spacewalks after completing 9 EVA's.

== Spaceflight experience ==
STS-61-B Atlantis was launched at night from the Kennedy Space Center (KSC), Florida, on November 26, 1985. During the mission, the crew deployed the MORELOS-B, AUSSAT-2, and SATCOM Ku-2 communications satellites, and operated numerous other experiments. Ross conducted two 6-hour spacewalks to demonstrate Space Station construction techniques with the EASE/ACCESS experiments. After completing 108 orbits of the Earth in 165 hours, 4 minutes, 49 seconds, Atlantis landed on Runway 22 at Edwards Air Force Base, California, on December 3, 1985.

STS-27 Atlantis, was launched from KSC on December 2, 1988. The mission carried a Department of Defense payload, as well as a number of secondary payloads. After 68 orbits of the Earth in 105 hours, 6 minutes, 19 seconds, the mission concluded with a dry lakebed landing on Runway 17 at Edwards Air Force Base, California, on December 6, 1988. The mission is noteworthy due to the severe damage Atlantis sustained to its critical heat-resistant tiles during ascent.

STS-37 Atlantis, was launched from KSC on April 5, 1991, and deployed the 35,000 pound Compton Gamma Ray Observatory. Ross performed two spacewalks totaling 10 hours and 49 minutes to manually deploy the stuck Gamma Ray Observatory antenna and to test prototype Space Station Freedom hardware. After 93 orbits of the Earth in 143 hours, 32 minutes, 44 seconds, the mission concluded with a landing on Runway 33, at Edwards Air Force Base, on April 11, 1991.

STS-55 Columbia, was launched from KSC on April 26, 1993. With Ross serving as Payload Commander/Mission Specialist, nearly 90 experiments were conducted during the German-sponsored Spacelab D-2 mission to investigate life sciences, materials science, physics, robotics, astronomy, and the Earth's atmosphere. Columbia landed on May 6, 1993, at Edwards Air Force Base, after 160 orbits of the Earth in 239 hours and 45 minutes.

STS-74 Atlantis, launched from KSC on November 12, 1995, was NASA's second Space Shuttle mission to rendezvous and dock with the Russian Space Station Mir. During the eight-day flight, the crew aboard Space Shuttle Atlantis attached a permanent docking module to Mir, conducted a number of secondary experiments, and transferred 1 1/2 tons of supplies and experiment equipment between Atlantis and the Mir station. Atlantis landed at Kennedy Space Center on November 20 after accomplishing their achievements in 129 orbits of the Earth, traveling 3.4 million miles in 196 hours, 30 minutes, 44 seconds.

STS-88 Endeavour (December 4–15, 1998) was the first International Space Station assembly mission. During the 12-day mission, the U.S.-built Unity module was mated with the Russian Zarya module. Ross performed three spacewalks totaling 21 hours 22 minutes to connect umbilicals and attach tools/hardware. The crew also deployed two satellites, Mighty Sat 1 and SAC-A. The mission was accomplished in 185 orbits of the Earth in 283 hours and 18 minutes.

STS-110 Atlantis (April 8–19, 2002) was the 13th Shuttle mission to visit the International Space Station (ISS). The first mission in the final phase of the ISS Assembly included the delivery and installation of the S0 Truss; the first time the station's robotic arm was used to maneuver space walkers around the station; it was also the first time that all of a shuttle crew's spacewalks were based from the station's, Quest Airlock. Ross performed 2 EVAs totaling 14 hours and 9 minutes. Mission duration was 259 hours and 42 minutes.

== Organizations ==
Ross is a lifetime member of the Association of Space Explorers, the Purdue Alumni Association, and a corresponding member of the International Academy of Astronautics.

== Awards and honors ==
- Defense Superior Service Medal with one Oak Leaf
- Legion of Merit
- Defense Meritorious Service Medal with three Oak Leaf Clusters
- Meritorious Service Medal with one Oak Leaf
- Distinguished Graduate of the USAF Test Pilot School
- Outstanding Flight Test Engineer Award, Class 75B
- Recipient of 15 NASA medals
- American Astronautical Society Victor A. Prather Award for space walking achievements (1985, 1990, 1999), and Flight Achievement Award (1992, 1996, 1999, 2002)
- Honorary Doctor of Science, Purdue University
- Jerry Ross Elementary School in Crown Point, Indiana was named after him.
