= STS-27 =

1988 near-disastrous American crewed spaceflight to deploy Lacrosse 1

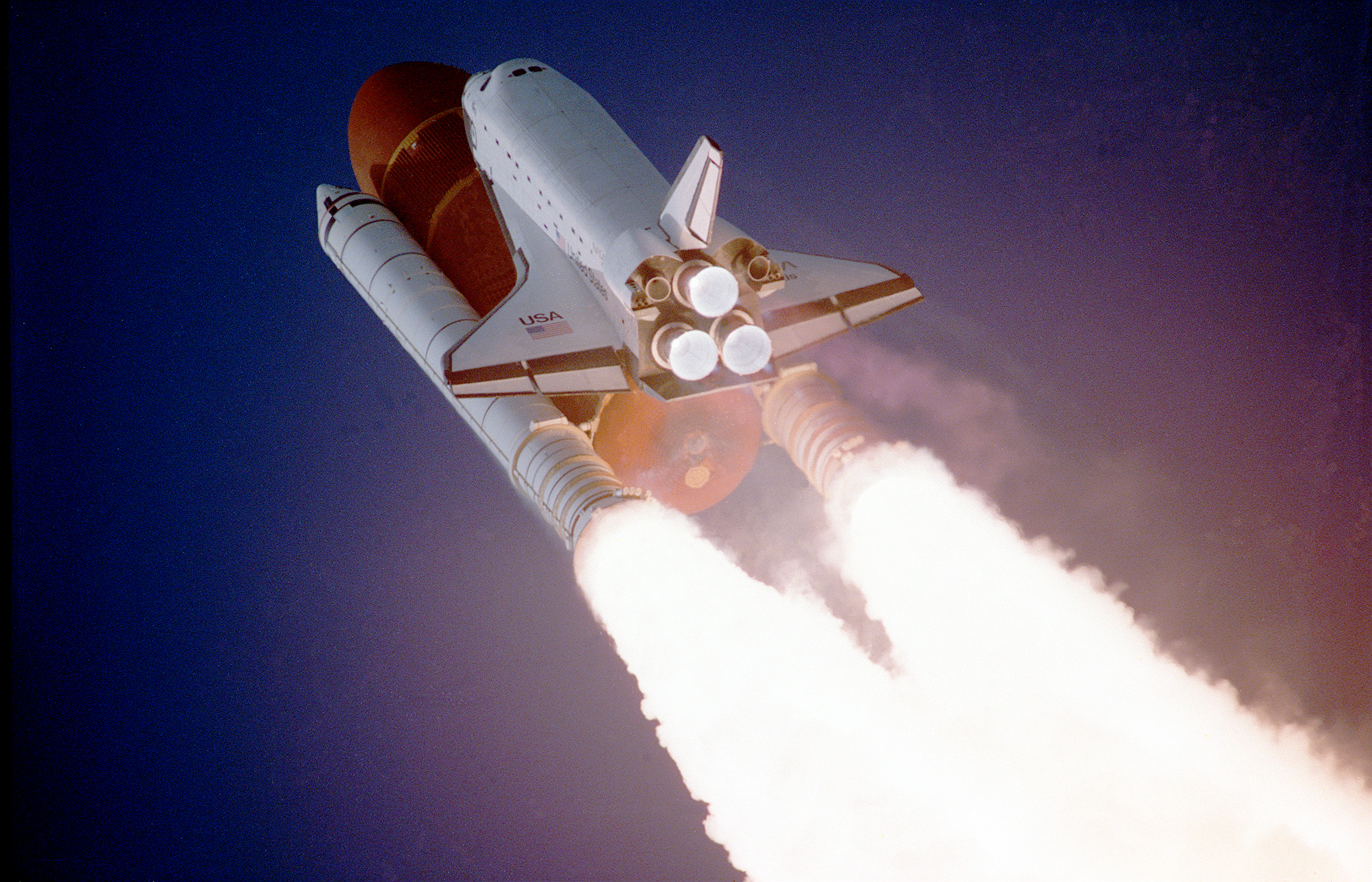
- Launch of Atlantis
- Names: Space Transportation System-27; STS-27R
- Mission type: DoD satellite deployment
- Operator: NASA
- COSPAR ID: 1988-106A
- SATCAT no.: 19670
- Mission duration: 4 days, 9 hours, 5 minutes and 37 seconds
- Distance travelled: 2,916,252 km (1,812,075 mi)
- Orbits completed: 68

Spacecraft properties
- Spacecraft: Space Shuttle Atlantis
- Launch mass: (Classified)
- Landing mass: 86,616 kg (190,956 lb)
- Payload mass: 14,500 kg (32,000 lb)

Crew
- Crew size: 5
- Members: Robert L. Gibson; Guy S. Gardner; William M. Shepherd; Jerry L. Ross; Richard M. Mullane

Start of mission
- Launch date: December 2, 1988, 14:30:34 UTC (9:30:34 am EST)
- Launch site: Kennedy, LC-39B
- Contractor: Rockwell International

End of mission
- Landing date: December 6, 1988, 23:36:11 UTC (3:36:11 pm PDT)
- Landing site: Edwards, Runway 17

Orbital parameters
- Reference system: Geocentric orbit
- Regime: Low Earth orbit
- Perigee altitude: 437 km (272 mi)
- Apogee altitude: 447 km (278 mi)
- Inclination: 57.00°
- Period: 93.40 minutes
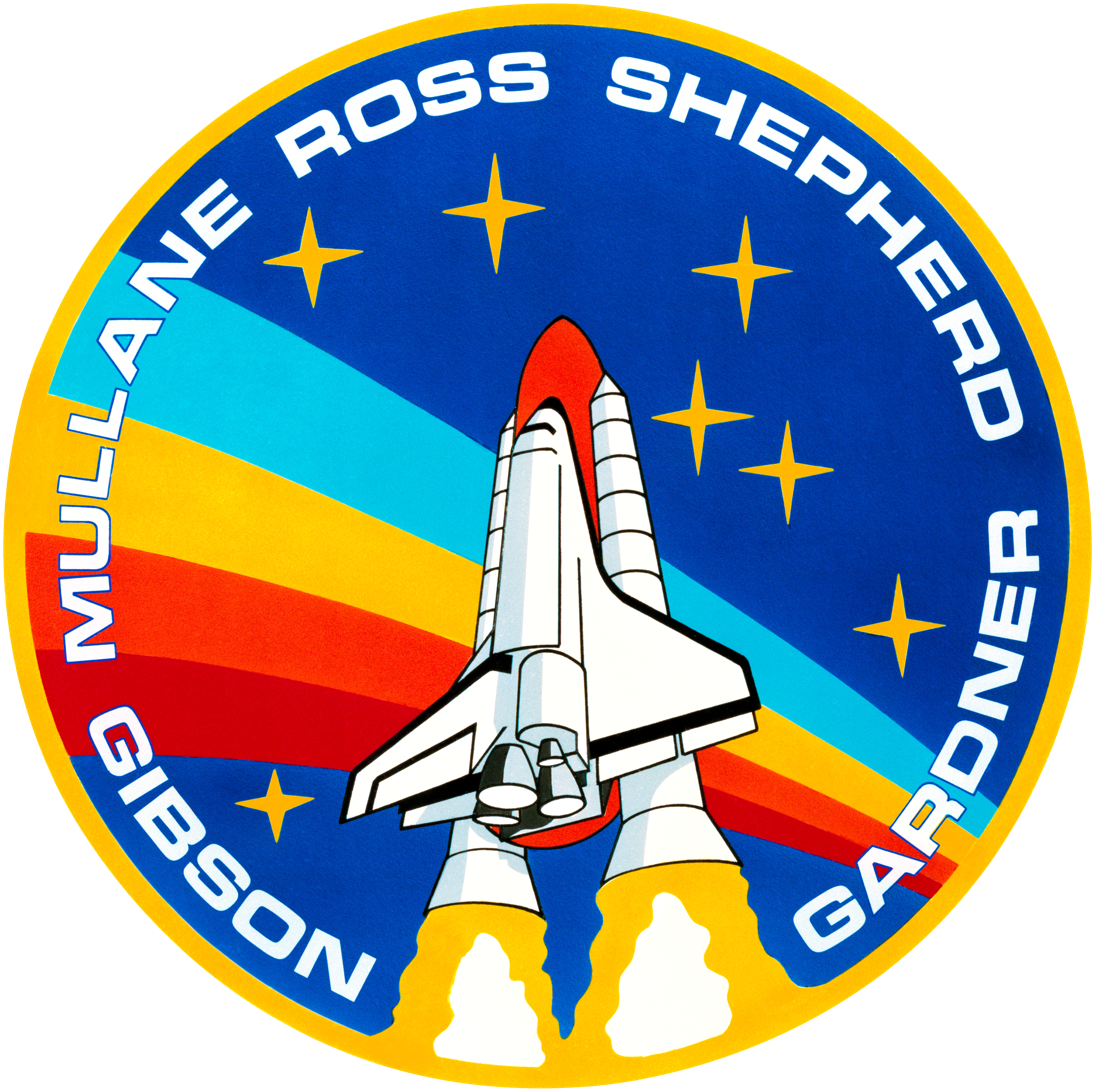
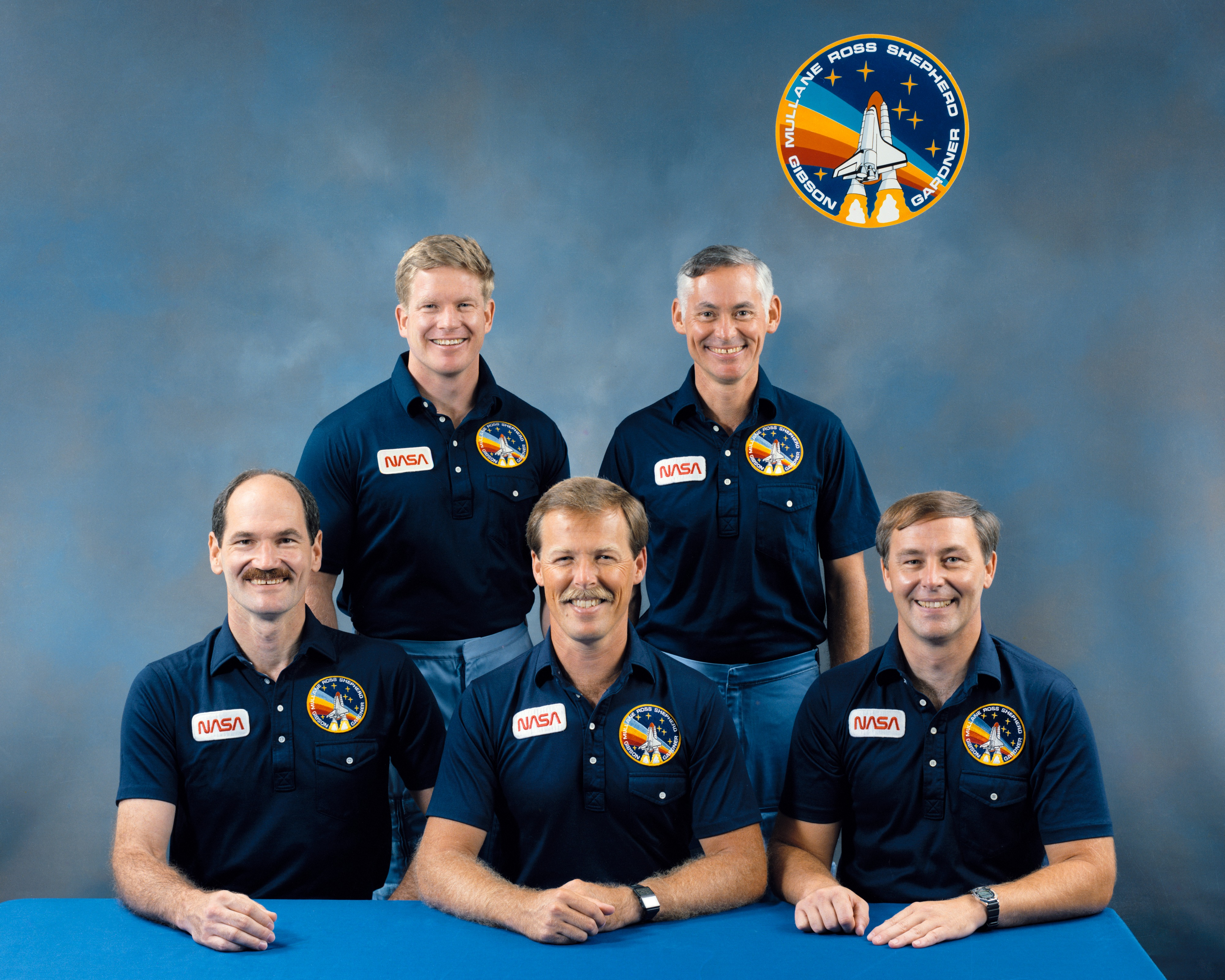
- STS-27 mission patch Back row: Shepherd and Mullane; Front row: Gardner, Gibson and Ross Space Shuttle program

STS-27 was the 27th NASA Space Shuttle mission, and the third flight of Space Shuttle Atlantis. Launching on December 2, 1988, on a four-day mission, it was the second shuttle flight after the Space Shuttle Challenger disaster of January 1986. STS-27 carried a classified payload for the U.S. Department of Defense (DoD), ultimately determined to be a Lacrosse surveillance satellite. The vessel's heat shielding was substantially damaged during lift-off, and crew members thought that they would die during reentry. This was a situation that was similar to the one that would prove fatal 15 years later on STS-107. Compared to the damage that Columbia sustained on STS-107, Atlantis experienced more extensive damage. However, this damage was experienced over less critical areas, and the missing tile was over an antenna which gave extra protection to the spacecraft structure. The mission landed successfully, although intense heat damage necessitated extensive repairs.

The mission is technically designated STS-27R, as the original STS-27 designator belonged to STS-51-I, the twentieth Space Shuttle mission. Official documentation for that mission contained the designator STS-27 throughout. As STS-51-L was designated STS-33, future flights with the STS-26 through STS-33 designators would require the R in their documentation to avoid conflicts in tracking data from one mission to another.

== Crew ==
Position	Astronaut
Commander	Robert L. Gibson; Third spaceflight
Pilot	Guy S. Gardner; First spaceflight
Mission Specialist 1	Richard M. Mullane; Second spaceflight
Mission Specialist 2 Flight Engineer	Jerry L. Ross; Second spaceflight
Mission Specialist 3	William M. Shepherd; First spaceflight

Prior to the Challenger disaster, this mission was slated to launch in July 1986 as STS-62-A with Discovery as the orbiter, and was slated to launch at Vandenberg Space Force Base in Santa Barbara County, California. Dale A. Gardner was originally assigned to be as mission specialist, which would have been his third spaceflight. Gardner chose to retire from NASA in October 1986, he was replaced by rookie William Shepherd. Space launches to be scheduled in Vandenberg were eventually cancelled permanently in December 1989, nearly four years following the Challenger disaster.

=== Crew seat assignments ===
Seat	Launch	Landing	Seats 1–4 are on the flight deck. Seats 5–7 are on the mid-deck.
1	Gibson		Seats 1–4 are on the flight deck. Seats 5–7 are on the mid-deck.
2	Gardner		Seats 1–4 are on the flight deck. Seats 5–7 are on the mid-deck.
3	Mullane	Shepherd	Seats 1–4 are on the flight deck. Seats 5–7 are on the mid-deck.
4	Ross		Seats 1–4 are on the flight deck. Seats 5–7 are on the mid-deck.
5	Shepherd	Mullane	Seats 1–4 are on the flight deck. Seats 5–7 are on the mid-deck.
6	Unused		Seats 1–4 are on the flight deck. Seats 5–7 are on the mid-deck.
7	Unused		Seats 1–4 are on the flight deck. Seats 5–7 are on the mid-deck.

== Mission summary ==
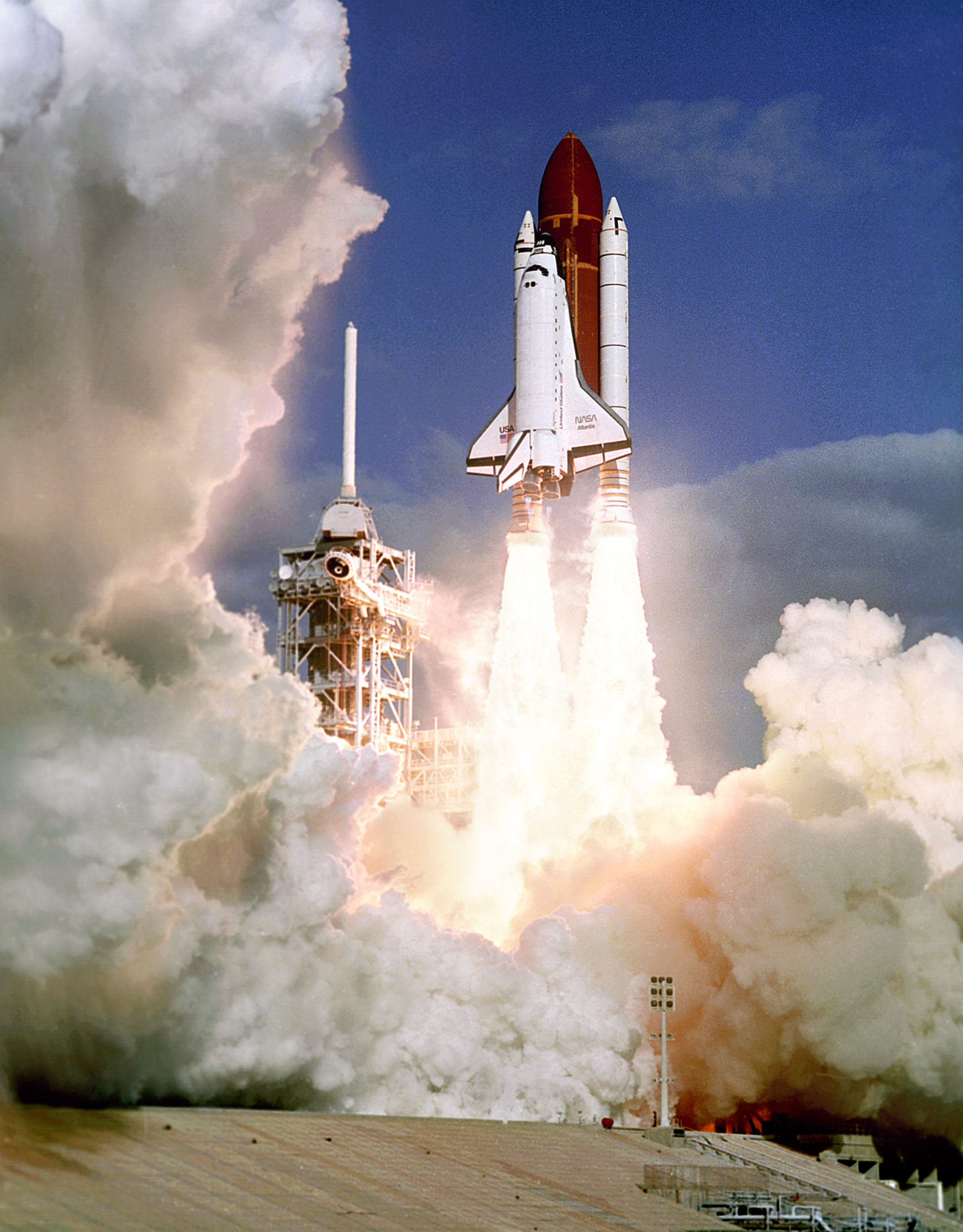
Atlantis launches on STS-27.

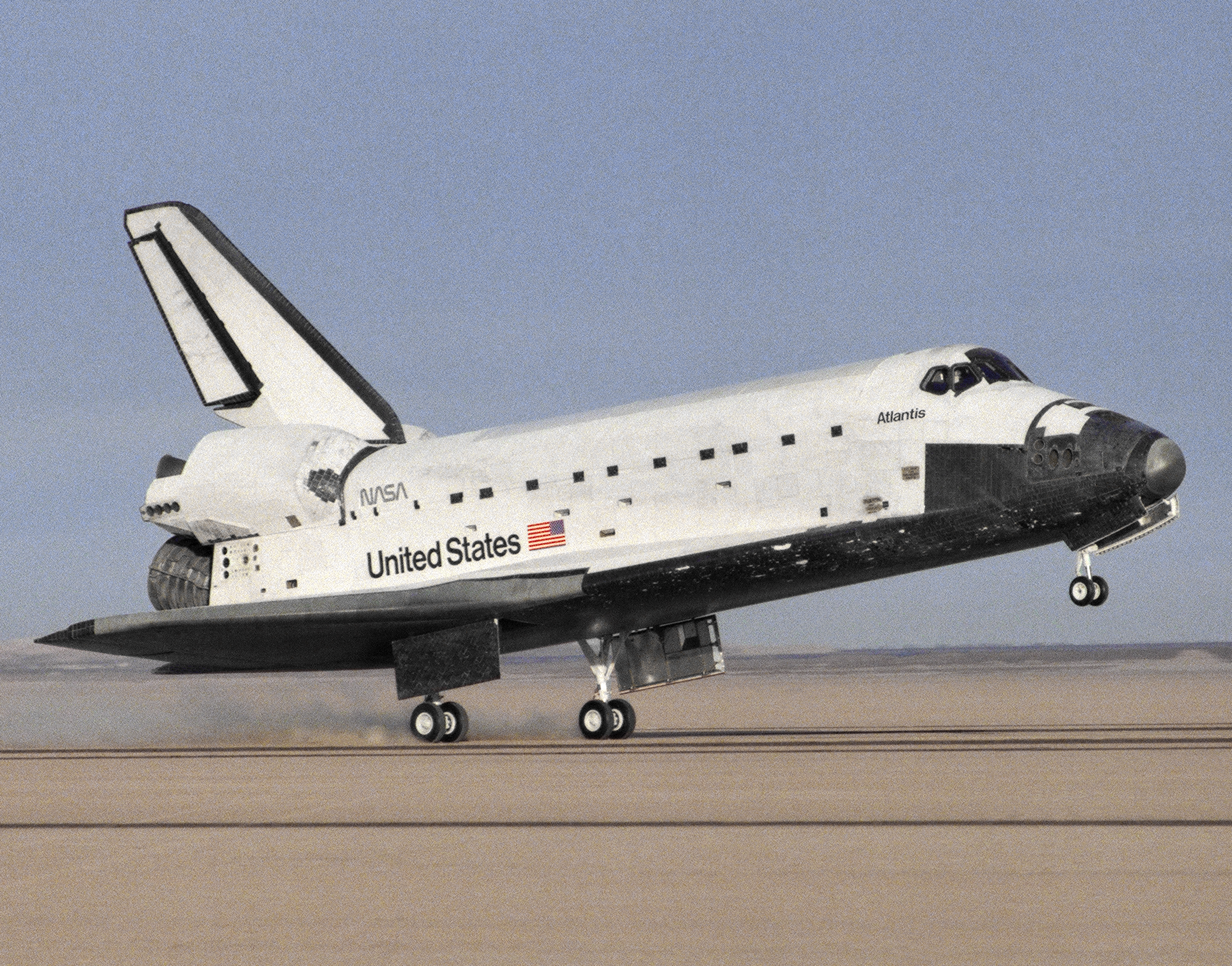
Damaged thermal protection tiles are clearly visible at touchdown.

Attempt	Planned	Result	Turnaround	Reason	Decision point	Weather go (%)	Notes
1	1 Dec 1988, 6:32:00 am	Scrubbed	—	Weather	1 Dec 1988, 9:15 am (T−00:09:00 hold)	20	Cloud cover and strong high-altitude winds. Due to the secrecy of the mission, NASA did not provide live coverage of the launch until nine minutes before liftoff. NASA and the Air Force stated that 6:32 AM was the earliest time that launch would occur.
2	2 Dec 1988, 9:30:34 am	Success	1 day 2 hours 59 minutes				T−9 minute hold extended due to high windshear. Countdown clock was held at T−31 seconds to assess TAL site weather.

The Space Shuttle Atlantis (OV-104), at the time the youngest in NASA's shuttle fleet, made its third flight on a classified mission for the United States Department of Defense (DoD). It deployed a single satellite, USA-34. NASA archival information has identified USA-34 as Lacrosse 1, a side-looking radar, all-weather surveillance satellite for the U.S. National Reconnaissance Office (NRO) and the Central Intelligence Agency (CIA).

The mission was originally scheduled to launch on December 1, 1988, but the launch was postponed one day because of cloud cover and strong wind conditions at the launch site. Liftoff occurred from LC-39B at Kennedy Space Center, Florida, on December 2, 1988, at 09:30:34 a.m. EST. Atlantis touched down on December 6, 1988, on Runway 17 at Edwards Air Force Base, California, at 18:36:11 EST. The total mission elapsed time at wheels-stop was 4 days, 9 hours, 5 minutes, and 37 seconds. Atlantis was returned to the Kennedy Space Center on December 13, 1988, and moved into an OPF on December 14, 1988.

There has been speculation that an EVA was conducted during this mission. Interviews with members of the crew several years after the flight confirmed there had been a problem with the satellite upon release, whereupon a rendezvous with the satellite was effected and repairs performed. These unspecified repairs could have necessitated a spacewalk, likely performed by Ross and Shepherd. As a classified DoD mission, details or confirmation of such an EVA remain unreleased.

The day after Atlantis landed, the 1988 Armenian earthquake killed tens of thousands in the Soviet Union. At an astronaut meeting Gibson said, "I know many of you may have been very curious about our classified payload. While I can't go into its design features, I can say Armenia was its first target! And we only had the weapon set on stun!"

== Tile damage ==
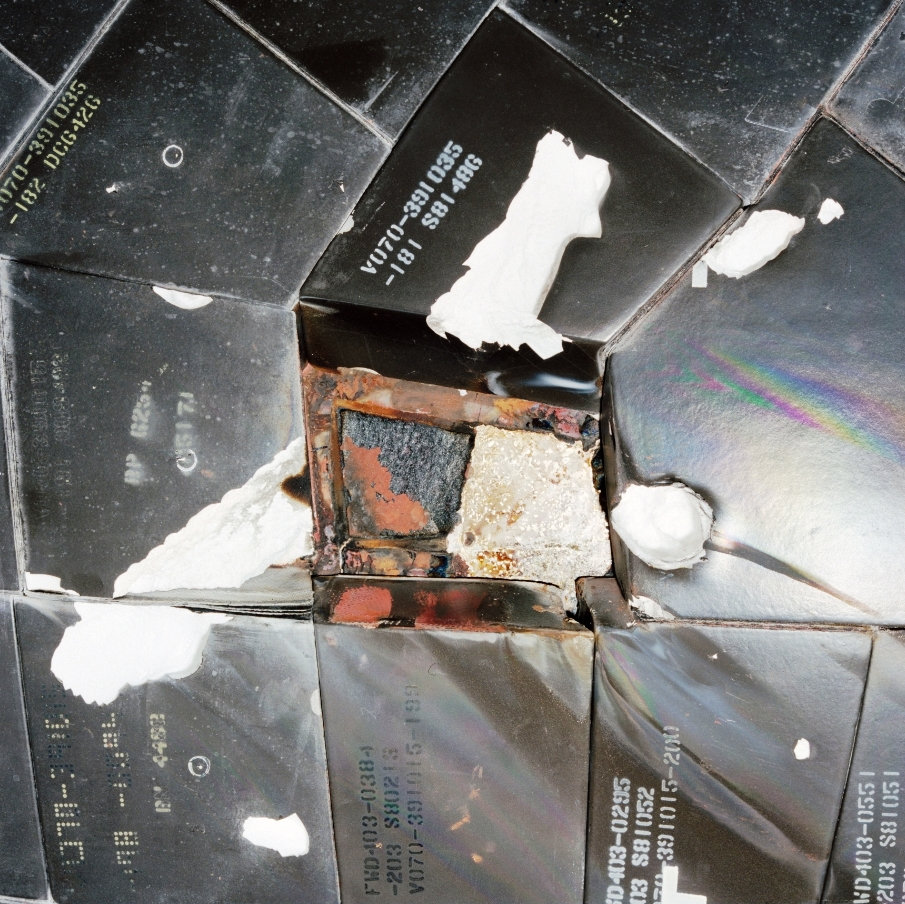
A partly melted aluminum plate on Atlantis' underside.

The Thermal Protection System tiles on Atlantis sustained extensive damage during the flight. Ablative insulating material from the starboard solid rocket booster nose cap had struck the orbiter about 85 seconds into the flight, as seen in footage of the ascent. The STS-27 crew also commented that white material was observed on the windshield at various times during ascent. The crew made an inspection of the shuttle's impacted starboard side using the shuttle's Canadarm, but the limited resolution and range of the cameras made it impossible to determine the full extent of the tile damage.

The problem was compounded by the fact that the crew was prohibited from using their standard method of sending images to ground control due to the classified nature of the mission. The crew was forced to use a slow, encrypted transmission method, likely causing the images NASA engineers received to be of poor quality, causing them to think the damage was actually "just lights and shadows". They told the crew the damage did not look any more severe than on past missions.

One report describes the crew as "infuriated" that Mission Control Center seemed unconcerned. When Gibson saw the damage he thought to himself, "We are going to die"; he and others did not believe that the shuttle would survive reentry. Gibson advised the crew to relax because "No use dying all tensed-up", he said, but if instruments indicated that the shuttle was disintegrating, Gibson planned to "tell mission control what I thought of their analysis" in the remaining seconds before his death.

Mullane recalled that while filming the reentry through the upper deck's overhead windows, "I had visions of molten aluminum being smeared backwards, like rain on a windshield". Although the shuttle landed safely, "the damage was much worse than any of us had expected", he wrote. Upon landing, the magnitude of the damage to the shuttle astonished NASA; over 700 damaged tiles were noted, and one tile was missing altogether. This missing tile had fortunately been located over the aluminum mounting plate for an L-band antenna (one of six, part of the Tactical air navigation system (TACAN) landing system), perhaps preventing a burn-through of the sort that would ultimately doom Columbia in 2003. There was almost no damage present on the orbiter's left side. STS-27 Atlantis was the most damaged launch-entry vehicle to return to Earth successfully. Gibson believed that had the shuttle been destroyed, Congress would have ended the shuttle program given that only one successful mission had occurred between his flight and the loss of Challenger.

A review team investigated the cause, beginning with a detailed inspection of the Atlantis TPS damage, and a review of related inspection reports to establish an in-depth anomaly definition. An exhaustive data review followed to develop a fault tree and several failure scenarios. This and other information gained during the review formed the basis for the team's findings and recommendations.

== Wake-up calls ==
NASA began a tradition of playing music to astronauts during Project Gemini, and first used music to awaken a flight crew during Apollo 15. Each track is specially chosen, often by the astronauts' families, and usually has a special meaning to an individual member of the crew, or is applicable to their daily activities.

Flight Day	Song	Artist/Composer
Day 2	Army fight song	
Day 3	"Rawhide" parody	Dimitri Tiomkin
Day 4	"Do You Want to Know a Secret" parody	Mike Cahill

== Gallery ==
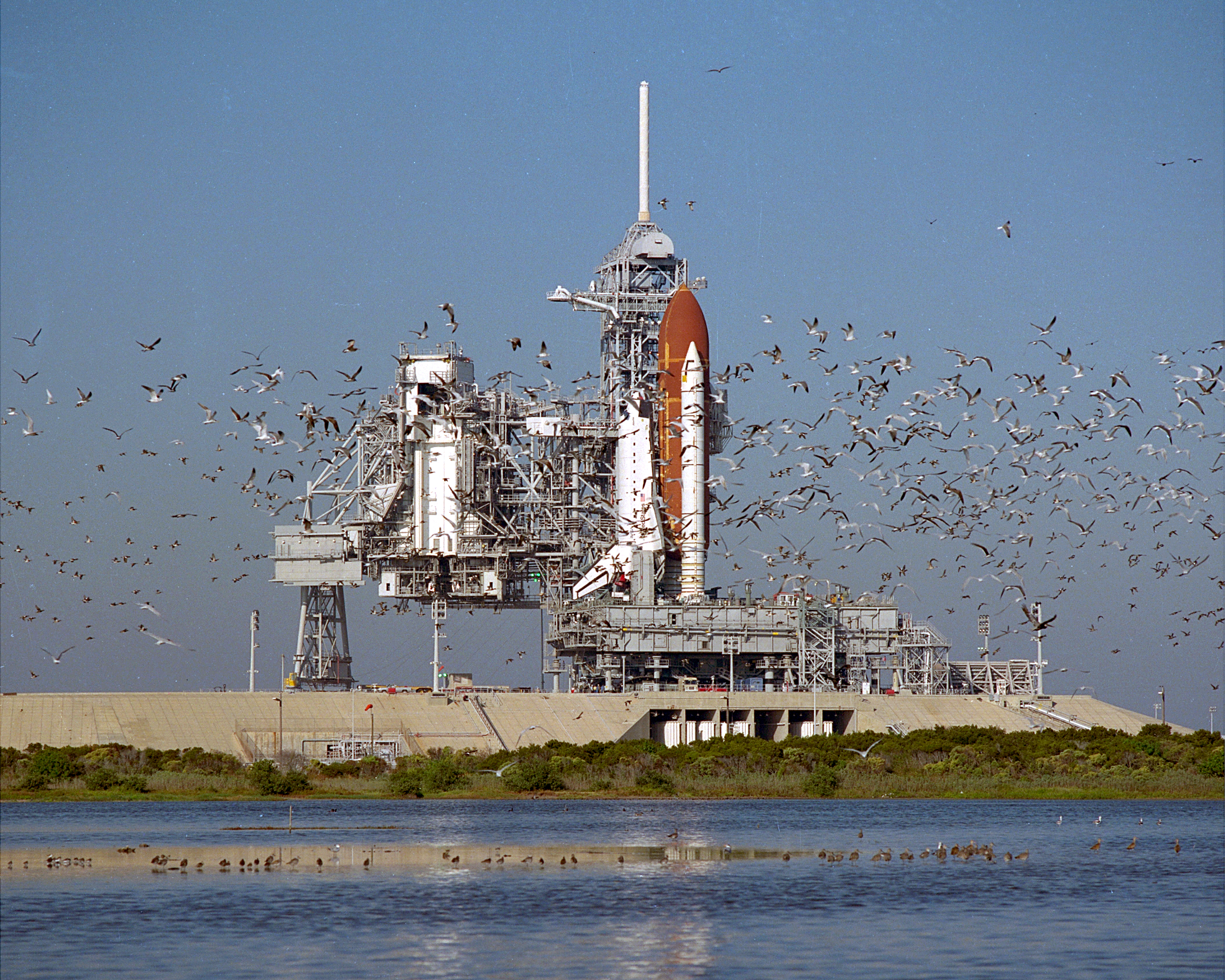
Atlantis on its launchpad

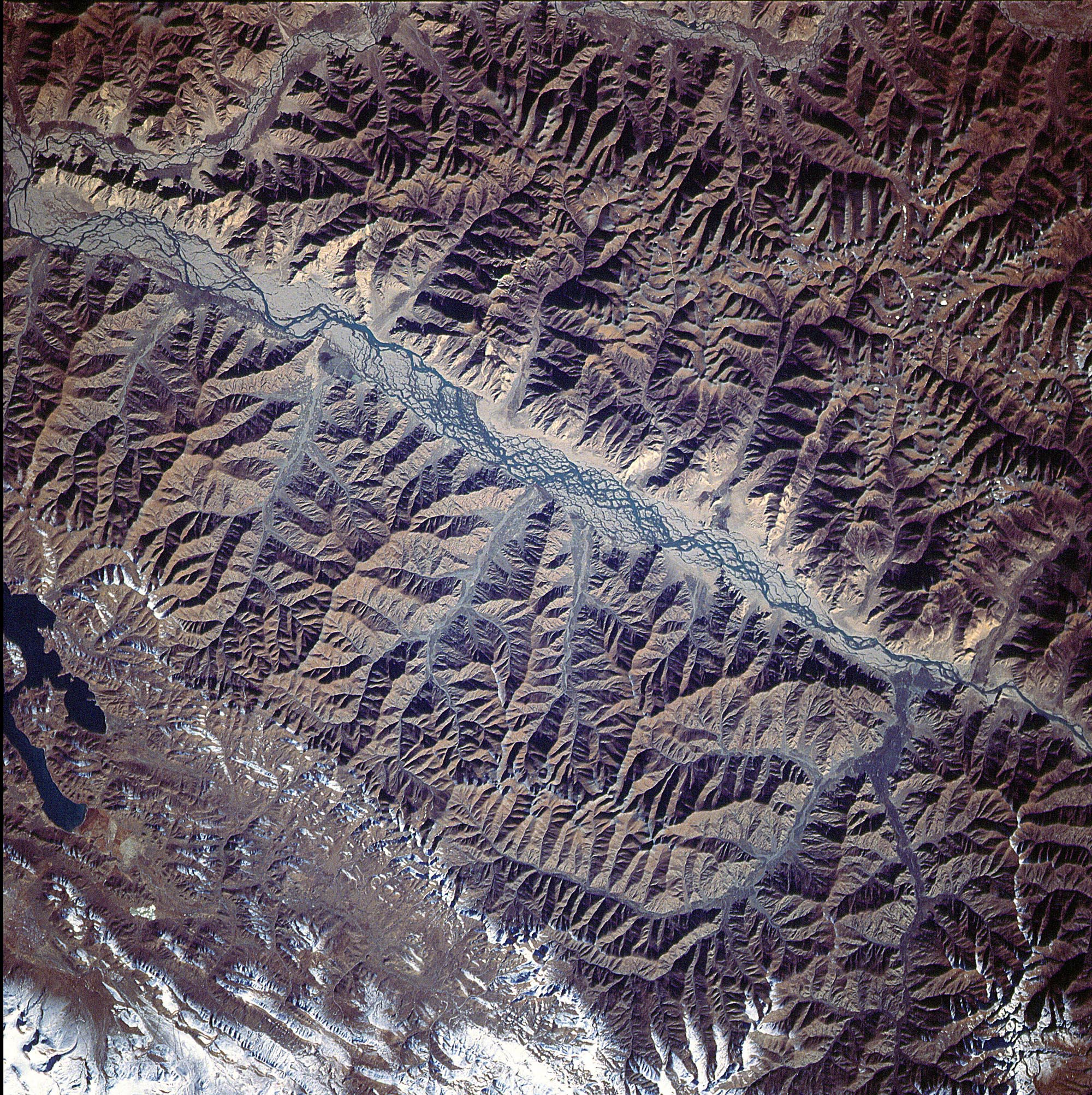
The Brahmaputra River imaged from orbit.

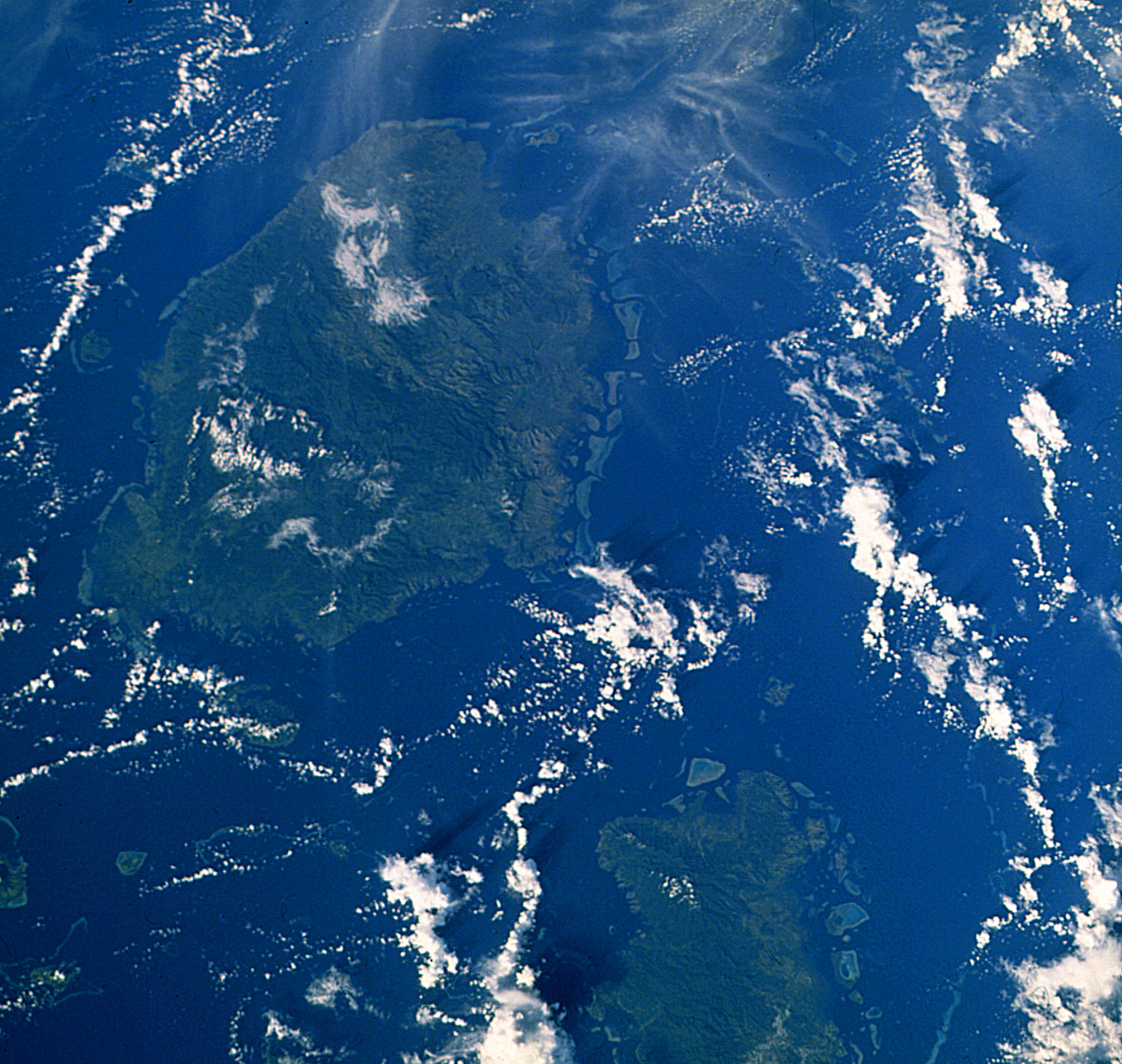
Fiji imaged from orbit.

== See also ==
- List of human spaceflights
- List of Space Shuttle missions
- Militarization of space
