= Charles Lutz =

American artist

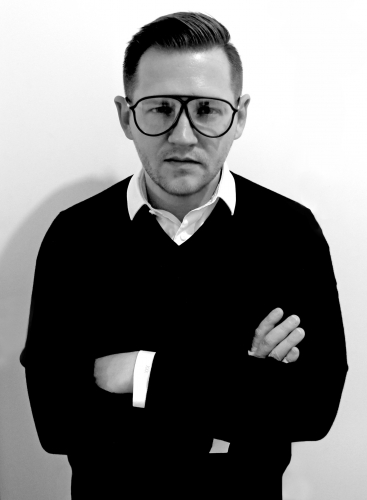
Artist Charles Lutz 2016

Charles Lutz is an American painter born in 1982 near Pittsburgh, Pennsylvania. Lutz studied Painting and Art History at the Pratt Institute in Brooklyn, NY, and Anatomy at Columbia University, NY. He earned a BFA from the Pratt Institute College of Art in 2004. Lutz lives and works between Red Lion, PA and Brooklyn, NY.

== Career ==
Lutz most recently exhibited a series of new sculptures at Frank Lloyd Wright's Fallingwater in Mill Run, PA, in 2022. He drew inspiration from the iconic home and the objects once sold at the Kaufmann's Department Store, which helped fund its construction.

Since his first solo exhibition in 2007, Lutz's work has been featured in major galleries and institutions across the US and abroad, including the Andy Warhol Museum in Pittsburgh, the Carnegie Museum in Pittsburgh, the Artipelag Museum in Stockholm, the New Museum in New York, and the Dickinson Gallery in New York, among others. His work, which addresses themes of consumerism and originality, has garnered significant critical acclaim and has even been cited in the Supreme Court case Warhol Foundation v. Goldsmith.

Lutz is widely recognized for his exploration of originality within the art world, particularly through his series of "Denied" Warhol works. These works were intentionally submitted to the Warhol Authentication Board to be formally denied as an act of creative destruction. His art engages with the tradition of the ready-made in contemporary and modern art, examining cultural relationships with originality, consumerism, and consumption.

In his exhibition "Charts, Price Lists, Corrections, and Other Relevant Statements" at the Brooklyn project space Five Myles, Lutz explored themes of consumption and ego through large-scale paintings based on auction sales price lists from Christie's and Sotheby's, as well as large-scale photo-based works referencing the auction houses' promotional materials.

Lutz continued his exploration of value and transference in his 2013 show "Ends and Means," focusing on the abstraction of value and the trace of currency movements. One of the most iconic pieces from this exhibition was a 12-foot-tall monochrome red oil painting of former Federal Reserve Chairman Alan Greenspan. Other works included paintings constructed from used currency bank bags and large paintings based on re-transcriptions of robbery notes. The show was reviewed in both Modern Painters and The Wall Street Journal.

Later in 2013, Lutz created one of his largest public installations to date for the 100th anniversary of Marcel Duchamp's groundbreaking and controversial Armory Show. Curated by Eric Shiner, the former director of The Andy Warhol Museum, for Armory Focus: USA, Lutz's site-specific installation, "Babel," was inspired by Pieter Bruegel's famous painting. The installation featured 1,500 cardboard replicas of Warhol's Brillo Box (Stockholm Type), stacked 20 feet tall. All 1,500 boxes were then freely distributed to the public, thereby debasing the Brillo Box as an art commodity and challenging its willing consumers.

== Exhibitions ==
Solo Exhibitions and Installations

- Modern Made Leisure: An installation at Frank Lloyd Wright's Fallingwater, Mill Run, PA, June 7 - December 31, 2022
- New Yorker Paintings: Galerie Clemens Gunzer, Kitzbühel, Austria, August 5 – September 5, 2017
- The Corruptible: Window Installation, New Museum, New York, NY, July 29 - August 25, 2014
- Babel: Armory Focus: USA, Site-specific installation curated by Eric Shiner, The Armory Show, New York, NY, March 6 – 10, 2013
- Ends and Means: C24 Gallery, New York, NY, January 17 - March 1, 2013
- Charts, Price Lists, Corrections, and Other Relevant Statements: FiveMyles Gallery, Brooklyn, NY, July 10 - August 28, 2010
- Denial & Acceptance: PEP Gallery, Brooklyn, NY, May 5 - June 15, 2007

Select Group Exhibitions and Special Projects

- Sea Change: Miranda Kuo Gallery, New York, NY, October 1 – 12, 2017
- Shed: Christies Fine Art Services, Christies Summer Preview, Red Hook, NY, July 11, 2017
- The Legacy of Andy Warhol: Artipelag Museum, Stockholm, Sweden, April 14 – September 24, 2016
- Scent: Curated by Julio Felix in conjunction with Y&S, Dickinson Gallery, New York, NY, December 15, 2015 - January 12, 2016
- Bit-Rot, Douglas Coupland: Witte de With Center for Contemporary Art, Rotterdam, Netherlands, September 11, 2015 - January 3, 2016
- The Frivolous Now: Curated by Julio Felix in conjunction with Y&S, Alon Zakaim Gallery, London, UK, June 24 - July 26, 2015
- Warhol: Fabricated: UAB Abroms-Engel Institute, Birmingham, AL, January 9 - February 28, 2015
- Logical Guesses: Curated by House of the Nobleman, Driscoll Babcock Gallery, New York, NY, March 13 - April 26, 2014
- (Con)text: Curated by Tim Donovan, Sharon Arts Center, Sharon, NH, September 6 – October 25, 2013
- Regarding Warhol, 60 Artists Fifty Years: Installation of Babel, The Andy Warhol Museum, Pittsburgh, PA, February 3 - April 28, 2013
- Artificial Tree (Brillo Stockholm Type): 15 ft. tall site-specific sculptural installation produced in association with The Andy Warhol Museum and Carnegie Museum of Art, Pittsburgh, PA, November 28, 2012 - January 2013
- Re-Make / Re-Model: Hionas Gallery, New York, NY, February 9 – March 3, 2012
- Terminal 5: Select sculptures included in the News Stand installation curated by Tobias Wong, installed in the Eero Saarinen designed TWA Terminal, JFK International, New York, NY, October 2004
