= STS-61-J =

Canceled 1986 American crewed spaceflight to the Hubble Space Telescope

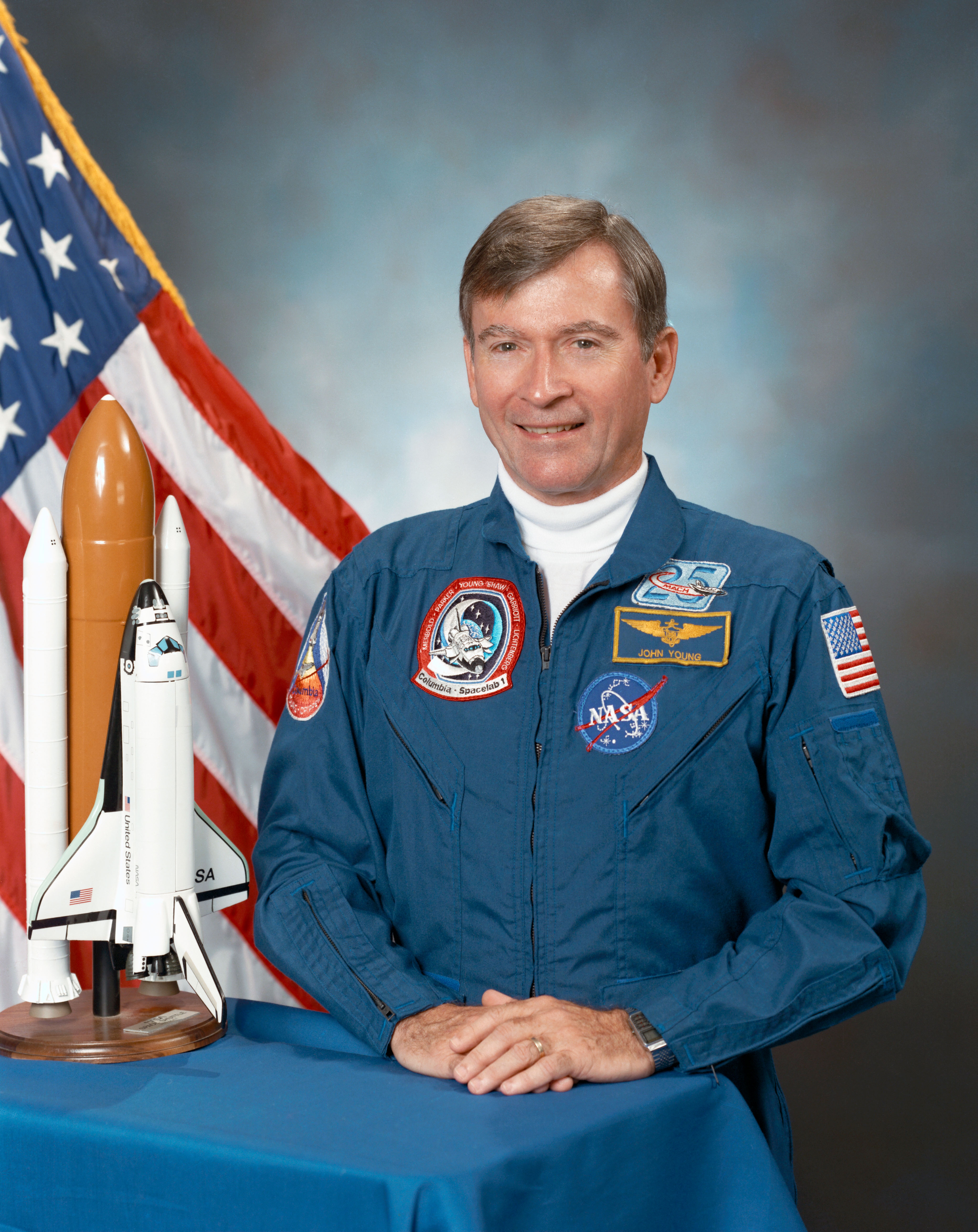
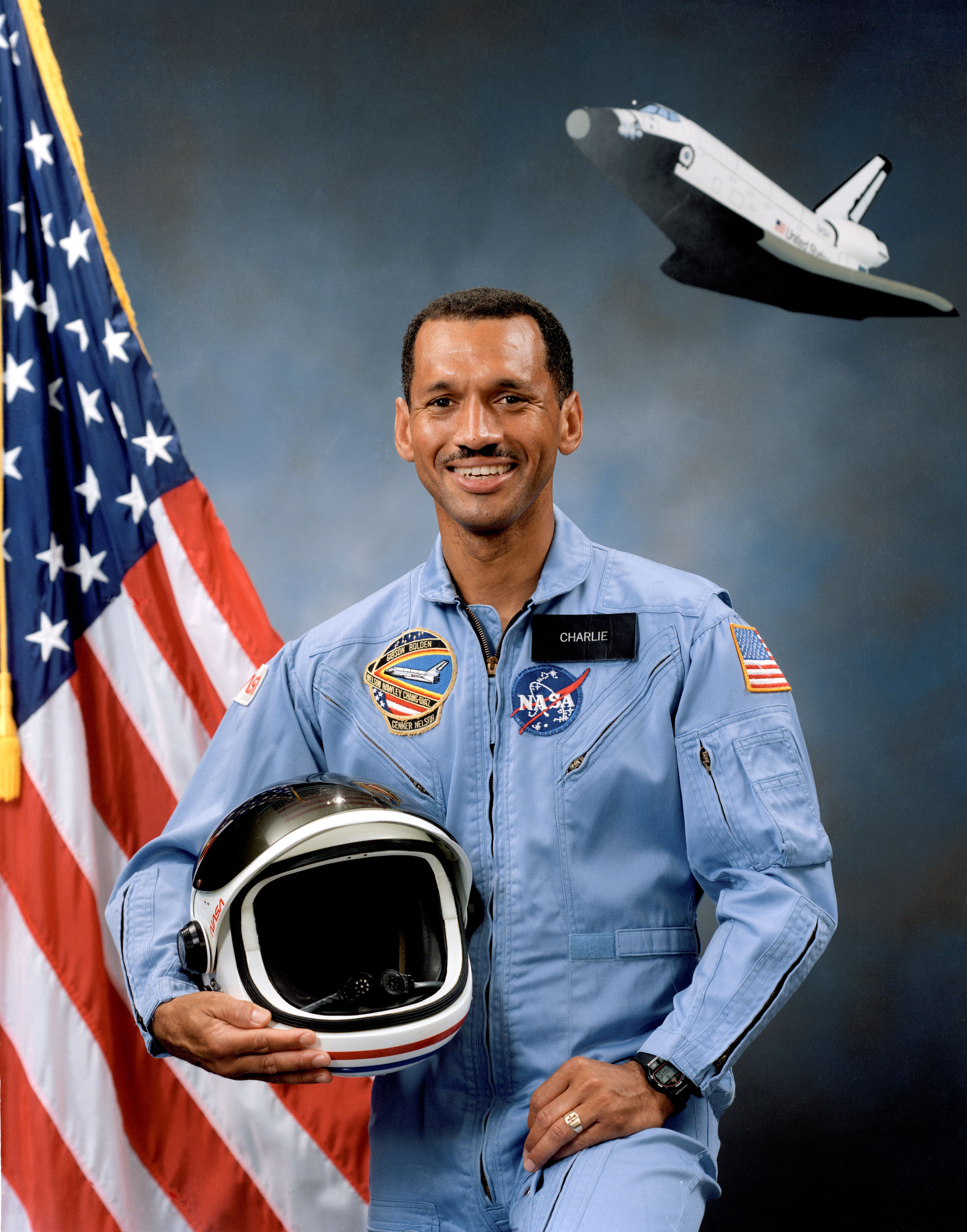
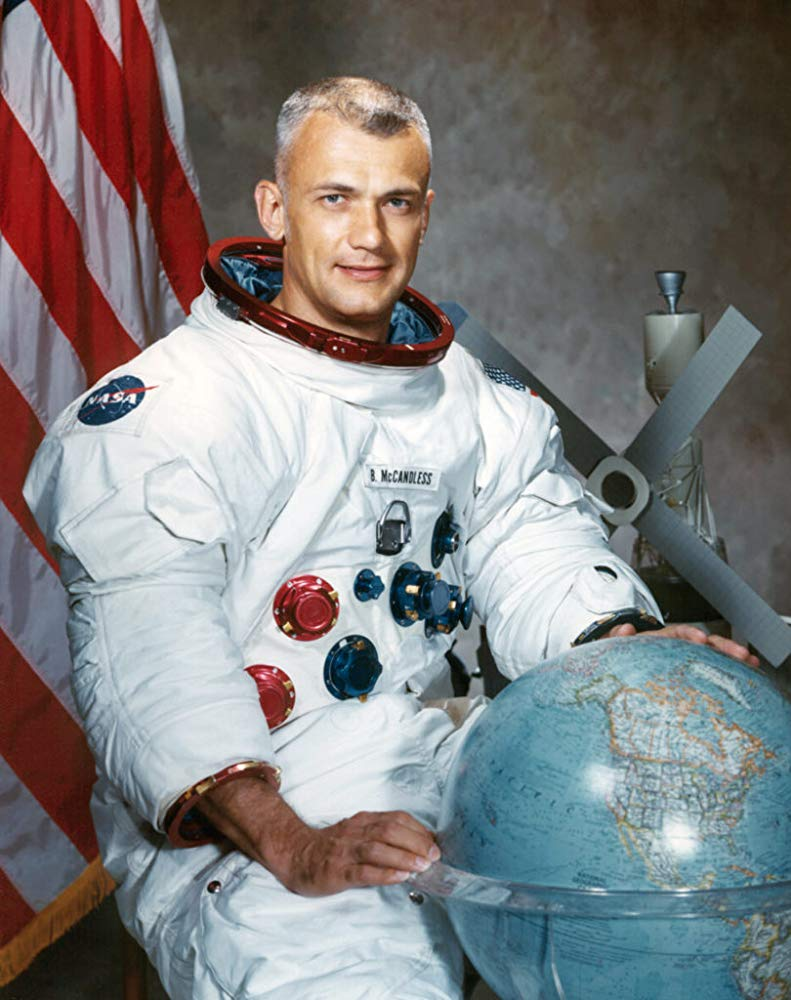
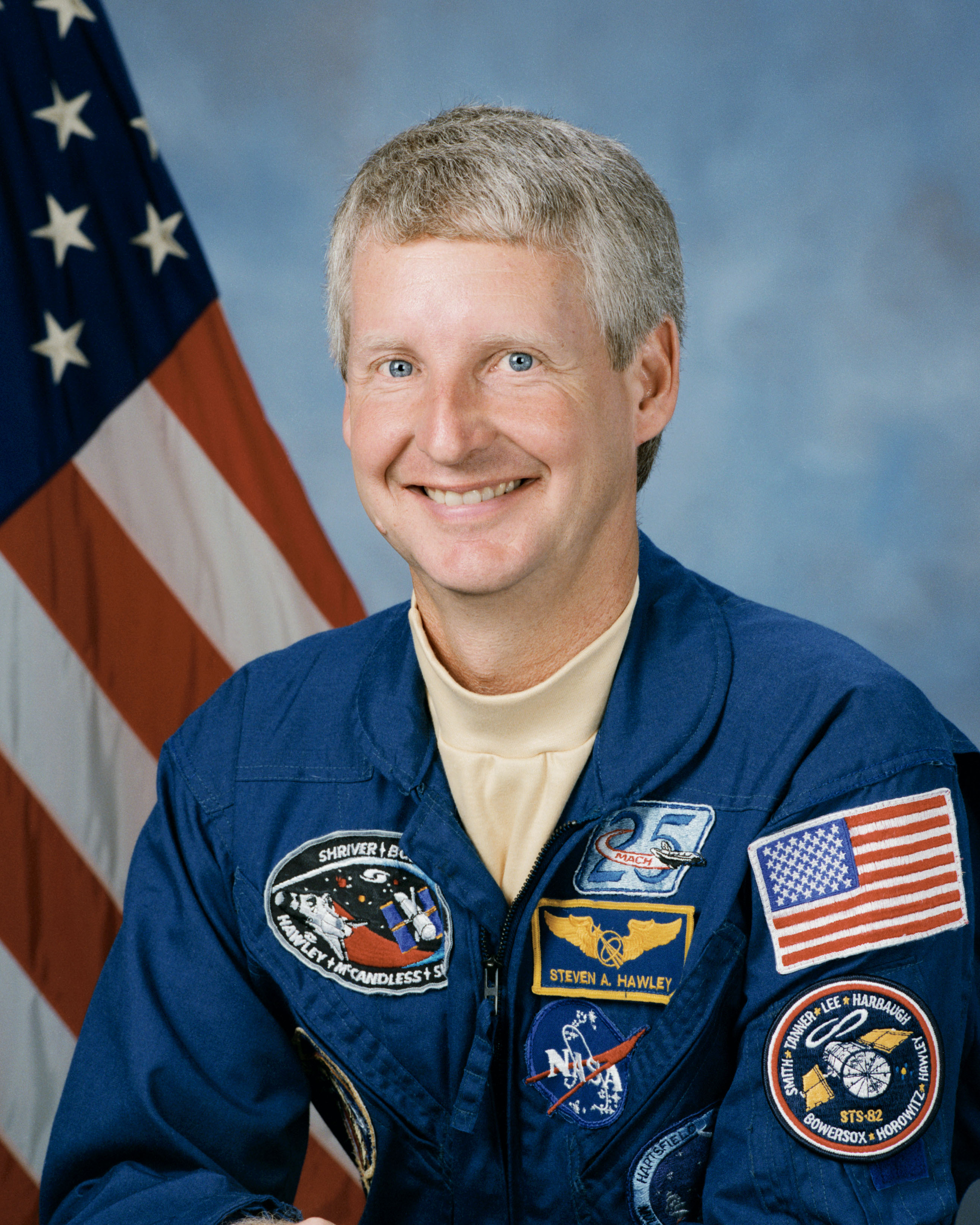
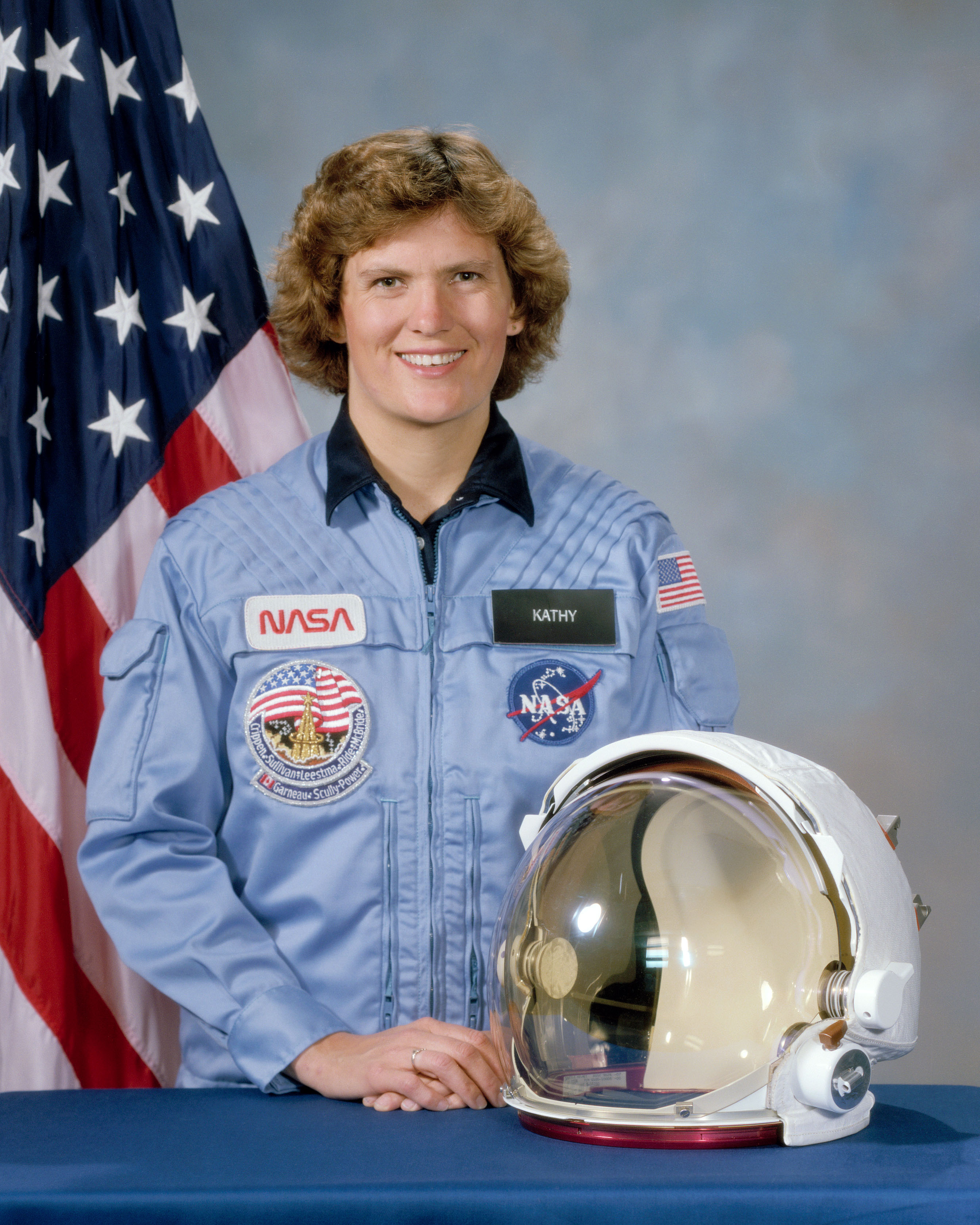
- John Young Charles Bolden Bruce McCandless Steven Hawley Kathryn Sullivan The planned crew of STS-61-J
- Names: Space Transportation System
- Mission type: Hubble Space Telescope deployment
- Operator: NASA
- Mission duration: 5 days (planned)

Spacecraft properties
- Spacecraft: Space Shuttle Atlantis (planned)

Crew
- Crew size: 5 (planned)
- Members: John Young; Charles F. Bolden Jr.; Bruce McCandless II; Steven A. Hawley; Kathryn D. Sullivan

Start of mission
- Launch date: 18 August 1986 (planned)
- Rocket: Space Shuttle Atlantis
- Launch site: Kennedy Space Center, LC-39
- Contractor: Rockwell International

Orbital parameters
- Reference system: Geocentric orbit (planned)
- Regime: Low Earth orbit
- Perigee altitude: 613 km (381 mi)
- Apogee altitude: 615 km (382 mi)
- Inclination: 28.45°
- Period: 96.70 minutes
- Space Shuttle program Cancelled Shuttle missions

STS-61-J was a planned launch of NASA Space Shuttle Atlantis, scheduled for August 1986 to deploy the Hubble Space Telescope. It was canceled due to the Space Shuttle Challenger disaster earlier in the year. The crew members were to be John W. Young, Charles F. Bolden Jr., Bruce McCandless II, Steven A. Hawley, and Kathryn D. Sullivan. All of the crew members except John Young, who was reassigned to an administrative position, later flew on the STS-31 mission. Young was replaced by Loren J. Shriver for STS-31.

== Crew ==
Position	Astronaut
Commander	John W. Young; Would have been seventh space mission
Pilot	Charles F. Bolden Jr. Would have been second space mission
Mission Specialist 1	Bruce McCandless II; Would have been second space mission
Mission Specialist 2	Steven A. Hawley; Would have been third space mission
Mission Specialist 3	Kathryn D. Sullivan; Would have been second space mission
