= HST events =

Chronological history of the Hubble Space Telescopes

HST events, things of interest related to the Hubble Space Telescope, chronologically.

== 2018 ==
- Hubble takes a panoramic ultraviolet light view of over 15,000 thousand galaxies (part of Hubble Deep UV (HDUV) Legacy Survey).

== 2013 ==
- Hubble found evidence of water jets on Jupiter's moon Europa.
- Hubble finds and asteroid spouting comet-Like tails.
- Hubble found a new moon of Neptune in July 2013.

== 2012 ==
- Hubble detects a fifth satellite for Pluto.

== 2011 ==
- Hubble finds evidence for fourth Pluto satellite.

== 1997 ==
- NICMOS installed by a Space Shuttle servicing mission.

== 1990 ==
- Hubble launched on April 24, 1990, with the shuttle mission STS-31.
