= Steven Hawley =

American astronaut and astronomer (born 1951)

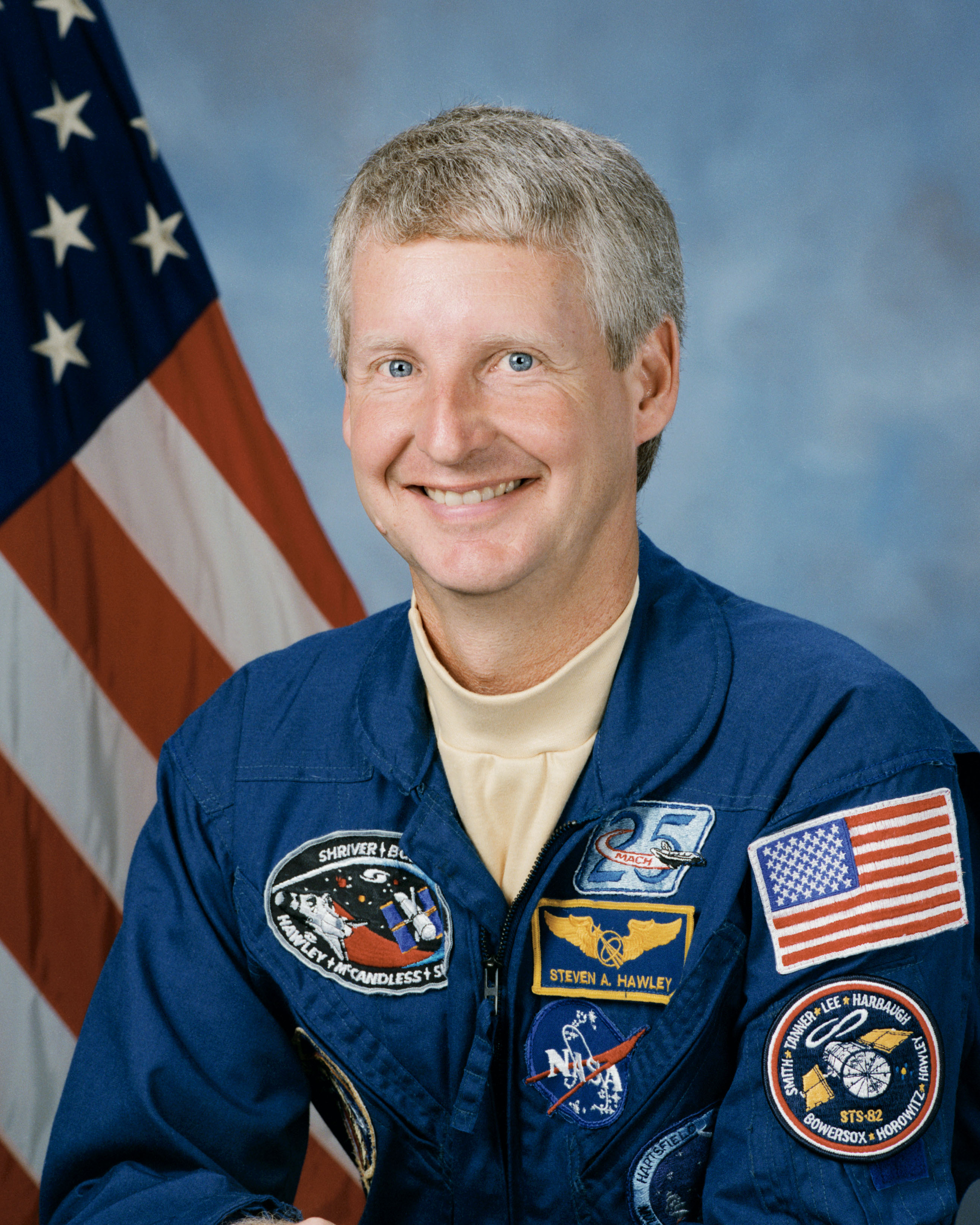
- Born: Steven Alan Hawley; December 12, 1951 (age 74); Ottawa, Kansas, U.S.
- Education: University of Kansas (BS); University of California, Santa Cruz (MS, PhD)
- Spouses: Sally Ride (m. 1982; div. 1987); Eileen Keegan
- Space career

NASA astronaut
- Time in space: 32d 2h 42min
- Selection: NASA Group 8 (1978)
- Mission: STS-41-D; STS-61-C; STS-31; STS-82; STS-93
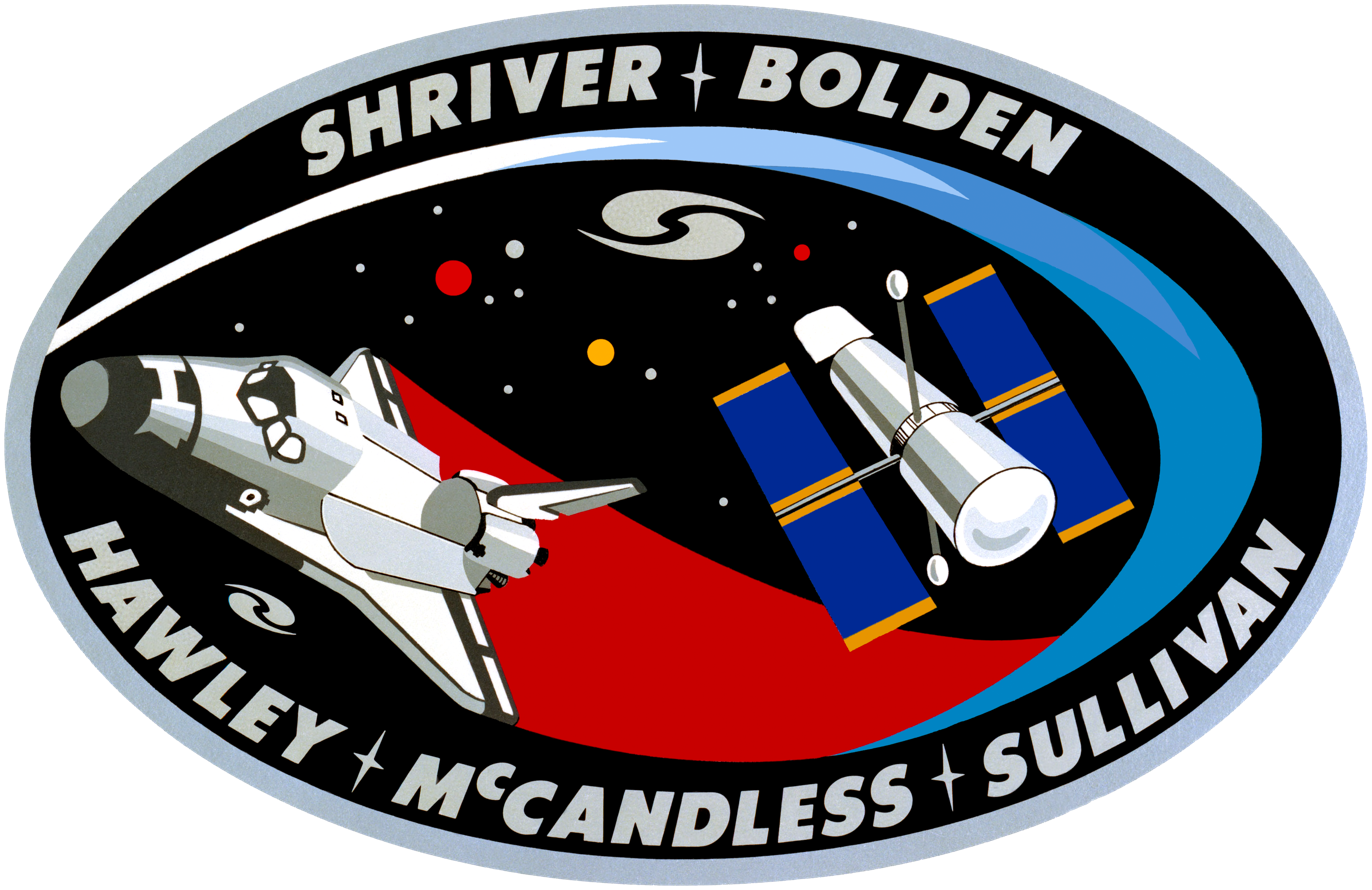
- Mission insignia

Steven Alan Hawley (born December 12, 1951) is a retired astronomer and NASA astronaut who flew on five U.S. Space Shuttle flights. Hawley is a professor emeritus of physics and astronomy at the University of Kansas.

== Early life ==
Hawley was born December 12, 1951, in Ottawa, Kansas, to Dr. and Mrs. Bernard Hawley. One of Hawley's brothers, John F. Hawley, was a theoretical astrophysicist at the University of Virginia and shared the Shaw Prize in Astronomy in 2013.

Hawley graduated from Salina High School Central, Salina, Kansas, in 1969; he regards Salina as his home town. Hawley attended the University of Kansas, graduating with highest distinction in 1973 with Bachelor of Science degrees in Physics and in Astronomy. He spent three summers employed as a research assistant: 1972 at the U.S. Naval Observatory in Washington, D.C., and 1973 and 1974 at the National Radio Astronomy Observatory in Green Bank, West Virginia. He attended graduate school at Lick Observatory, University of California, Santa Cruz, principal advisor was William L. Burke graduating in 1977 with a Doctorate in Astronomy and Astrophysics.

== Career ==
Prior to his selection by NASA in 1978, Hawley was a post-doctoral research associate at Cerro Tololo Inter-American Observatory in La Serena, Chile. His research involved spectrophotometry of gaseous nebulae and emission-line galaxies, with particular emphasis on chemical abundance determinations for these objects. The results of his research have been published in major astronomical journals.

Hawley is Professor Emeritus of Physics and Astronomy at the University of Kansas. He also served as director of engineering physics.

== Space-flight experience ==
Hawley logged a total of 32 days, 2 hours, 41 minutes in five space flights. He served as a mission specialist on STS-41D in 1984, STS-61C in 1986, STS-31 in 1990, STS-82 in 1997 and STS-93 in 1999. Hawley was the last member of NASA Astronaut Group 8 to make a space flight. He is also the only astronaut to deploy the Hubble Space Telescope (HST) and later fly on one of its servicing missions (STS-31 and STS-82, respectively).

=== STS-41-D Discovery ===
STS-41-D Discovery (August 30 to September 5, 1984) was launched from the Kennedy Space Center, Florida, on its maiden flight and landed at Edwards Air Force Base, California. During the seven-day mission, the crew successfully activated the OAST-1 solar cell wing experiment, deployed the SBS-D, SYNCOM IV-2, and TELSTAR 3-C satellites, operated the CFES-III experiment, the student crystal growth experiment, as well as photography experiments using the IMAX motion picture camera. The mission was completed in 96 orbits of the Earth in 144 hours and 57 minutes.

Following an aborted attempt to launch STS-41-D where two main engines were stopped shortly after they started because the third failed to start, Hawley is reported to have broken the tense atmosphere in the shuttle cabin, saying, "Gee, I thought we'd be a lot higher at MECO!"

=== STS-61-C Columbia ===
STS-61-C Columbia (January 12–18, 1986) was launched from the Kennedy Space Center, Florida, and returned to a night landing at Edwards Air Force Base, California. During the six-day flight, the crew deployed the SATCOM K1 satellite and conducted experiments in astrophysics and materials processing. Mission duration was 146 hours and 03 minutes.

=== STS-31 Discovery ===
STS-31 Discovery (April 24–29, 1990) was launched from the Kennedy Space Center in Florida, and also returned to land at Edwards Air Force Base, California. During the five-day mission, the crew deployed the Hubble Space Telescope, and conducted a variety of middeck experiments involving the study of protein crystal growth, polymer membrane processing, and the effects of weightlessness and magnetic fields on an ion arc. They also operated a variety of cameras, including both the IMAX in-cabin and cargo bay cameras, for Earth observations from their record-setting altitude of 380 miles. The mission was completed in 76 orbits of the earth in 121 hours.

=== STS-82 Discovery ===
STS-82 Discovery (February 11–21, 1997), the second Hubble Space Telescope (HST) maintenance mission, was launched at night and returned to a night landing at Kennedy Space Center, Florida. During the flight, Hawley's primary role was to operate the Shuttle's 50-foot robot arm to retrieve and redeploy the HST following completion of upgrades and repairs. Hawley also operated the robot arm during five spacewalks in which two teams installed two new spectrometers and eight replacement instruments. They also replaced insulation patches over three compartments containing key data-processing, electronics and scientific-instrument telemetry packages. HST was then redeployed and boosted to a higher orbit. The flight was completed in 149 orbits covering 3.8 million miles in 9 days, 23 hours, 37 minutes.

=== STS-93 Columbia ===
STS-93 Columbia (July 22–27, 1999) was launched at night from the Kennedy Space Center on a five-day mission returning to KSC for the 12th night landing in the Shuttle Program's history. Hawley served as Columbia's flight engineer. The primary mission objective was the successful deployment of the Chandra X-ray Observatory, the third of NASA's Great Observatories after Hubble Space Telescope and the Compton Gamma Ray Observatory. Hawley also served as the primary operator of a second telescope carried in the crew module and used for several days to make broadband ultraviolet observations of a variety of Solar System objects. The mission completed 79 orbits in 4 days, 22 hours, and 50 minutes.

== Organizations ==
Hawley is a member of the American Astronomical Society, the Astronomical Society of the Pacific, the American Institute of Aeronautics and Astronautics, Sigma Pi Sigma, and Phi Beta Kappa. Since retired, he resides in Lawrence, Kansas, where his parents also live.

== Personal life ==
Hawley married fellow astronaut Sally Ride in 1982. The couple divorced in 1987.

Subsequently, he married Eileen M. Keegan of Redondo Beach, California, a former public-affairs officer at NASA. She was appointed as spokeswoman for then-Kansas Governor Sam Brownback in 2013.

He enjoys basketball, softball, golf, running, playing bridge, and umpiring. Hawley appeared on an episode of Home Improvement, alongside Space Shuttle Commander, Kenneth Bowersox.

== Honors ==
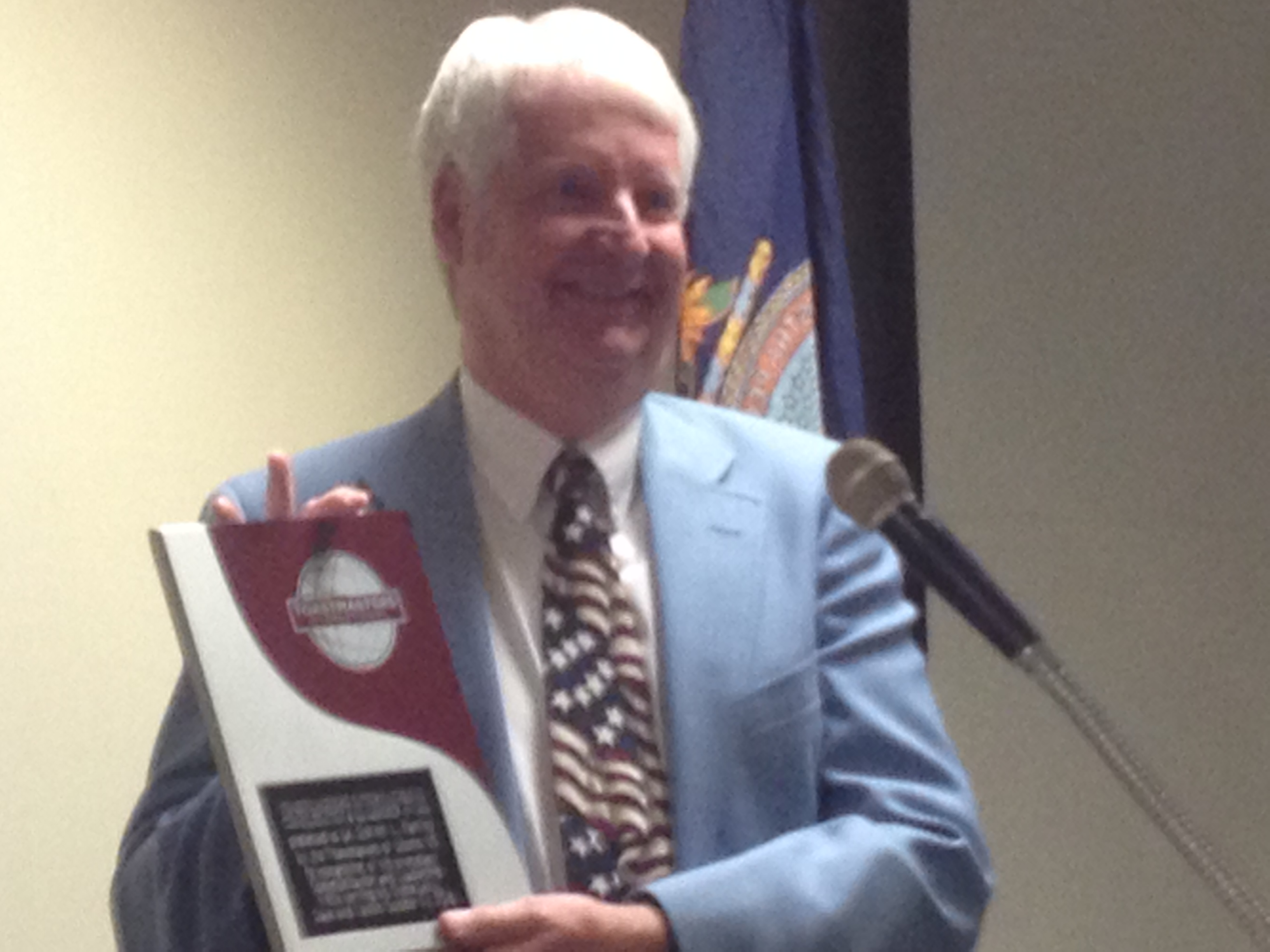
Steven Hawley, shown holding the Toastmasters District 22 Communication and Leadership award, Topeka, Kansas, October 24, 2015

Following is a list of scholarships, honors, and awards conferred on Hawley:

- Evans Foundation Scholarship, 1970
- University of Kansas Honor Scholarship, 1970
- Summerfield Scholarship, 1970–1973
- Veta B. Lear Award, 1970
- Stranathan Award, 1972
- Outstanding Physics Major Award, 1973
- University of California Regents Fellowship, 1974
- Group Achievement Award for software testing at the Shuttle Avionics Integration Laboratory, 1981
- NASA Outstanding Performance Award, 1981
- NASA Superior Performance Award, 1981
- Group Achievement Award for Second Orbiter Test and Checkout at Kennedy Space Center, 1982
- Quality Increase, 1982
- NASA Space Flight Medal (1984, 1986, 1990, 1997, 1999)
- Group Achievement Award for JSC Strategic Planning, 1987
- NASA Exceptional Service Medal (1988, 1991)
- Special Achievement Award, 1988
- Exceptional Service Medal for Return to Flight, 1988
- Outstanding Leadership Medal, 1990
- Special Achievement Award, 1990
- Haley Flight Achievement Award, 1991
- Kansan of the Year Award, 1992
- Group Achievement Award for ESIG 3000 Integration Project, 1994
- Presidential Rank Award (1994, 1999)
- Group Achievement Award for Space Shuttle Program Functional Workforce Review, 1995
- Group Achievement Award for SFOC Contract Acquisition, 1997
- Kansas Aviation Hall of Fame, 1997
- University of Kansas Distinguished Service Citation, 1998
- NASA Distinguished Service Medal (1998, 2000)
- Aviation Week & Space Technology Laurel Citation for Space, 1998
- V.M. Komarov Diploma from the FAI (Federation Aeronautique Internationale) (1998, 2000)
- Inductee, Astronaut Hall of Fame (2007)
- Distinguished Alumni Award, College of Liberal Arts and Sciences, University of Kansas, (2007)
- Distinguished Alumni Award, UC Santa Cruz, 1991
- Communication and Leadership Award (2015), Toastmasters District 22
