= STS-31 =

1990 American crewed spaceflight to deploy the Hubble Space Telescope

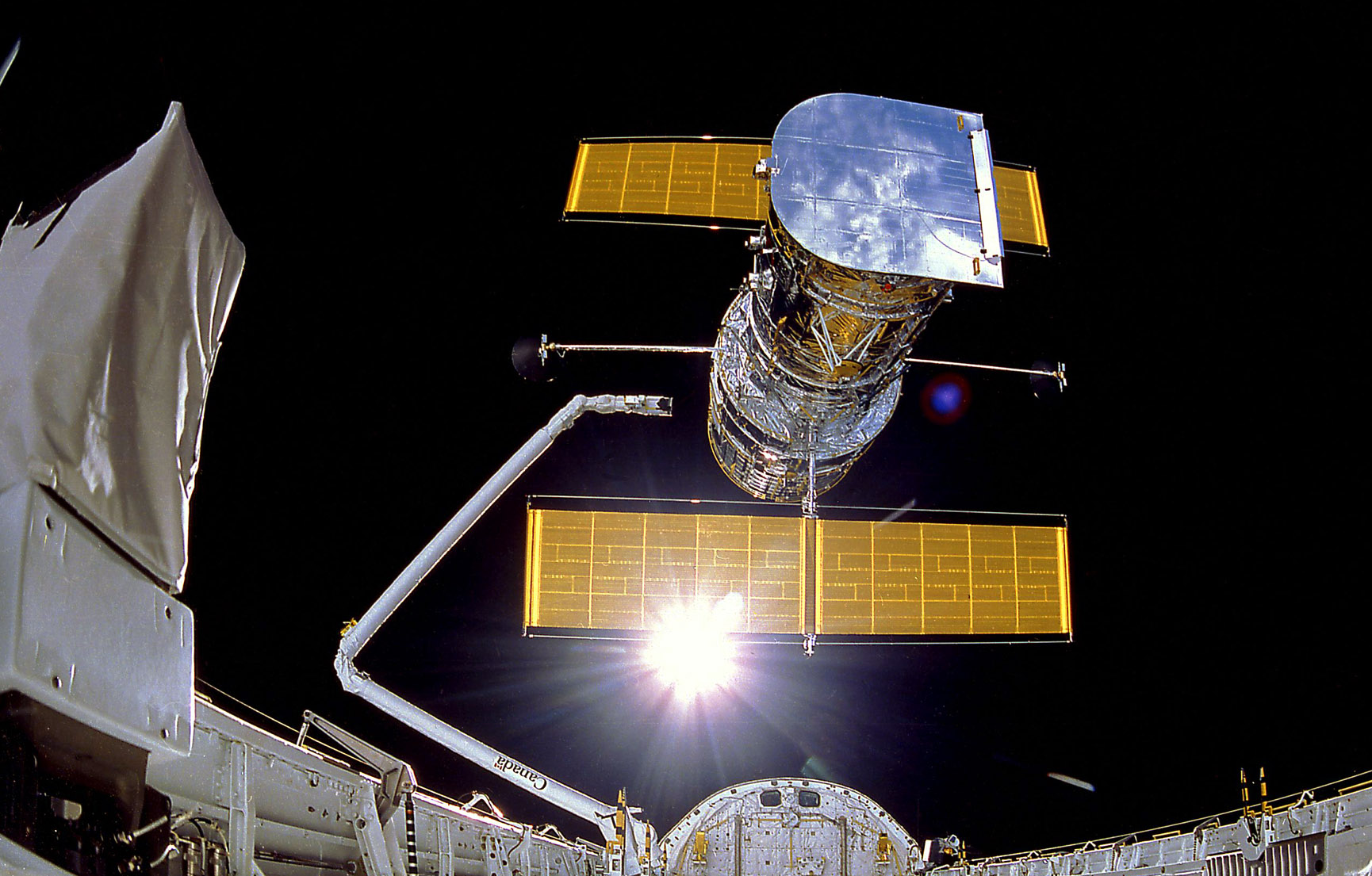
- Discovery deploys the Hubble Space Telescope.
- Names: Space Transportation System-31; STS-31R
- Mission type: Hubble Space Telescope deployment
- Operator: NASA
- COSPAR ID: 1990-037A
- SATCAT no.: 20579
- Mission duration: 5 days, 1 hour, 16 minutes, 6 seconds
- Distance travelled: 3,328,466 km (2,068,213 mi)
- Orbits completed: 80

Spacecraft properties
- Spacecraft: Space Shuttle Discovery
- Launch mass: 117,586 kg (259,233 lb)
- Landing mass: 85,947 kg (189,481 lb)
- Payload mass: 11,878 kg (26,187 lb)

Crew
- Crew size: 5
- Members: Loren Shriver; Charles Bolden; Bruce McCandless II; Steven Hawley; Kathryn D. Sullivan

Start of mission
- Launch date: April 24, 1990, 12:33:51 UTC (8:33:51 am EDT)
- Launch site: Kennedy, LC-39B
- Contractor: Rockwell International

End of mission
- Landing date: April 29, 1990, 13:49:57 UTC (6:49:57 am PDT)
- Landing site: Edwards, Runway 22

Orbital parameters
- Reference system: Geocentric orbit
- Regime: Low Earth orbit
- Perigee altitude: 613 km (381 mi)
- Apogee altitude: 615 km (382 mi)
- Inclination: 28.45°
- Period: 96.70 minutes

Instruments
- Air Force Maui Optical Site (AMOS); Ascent Particle Monitor (APM); IMAX Cargo Bay Camera (ICBC); In-flight Radiation Dose Distribution (IDRD); Protein Crystal Growth (PCG); Radiation Monitoring Equipment III (RME III)
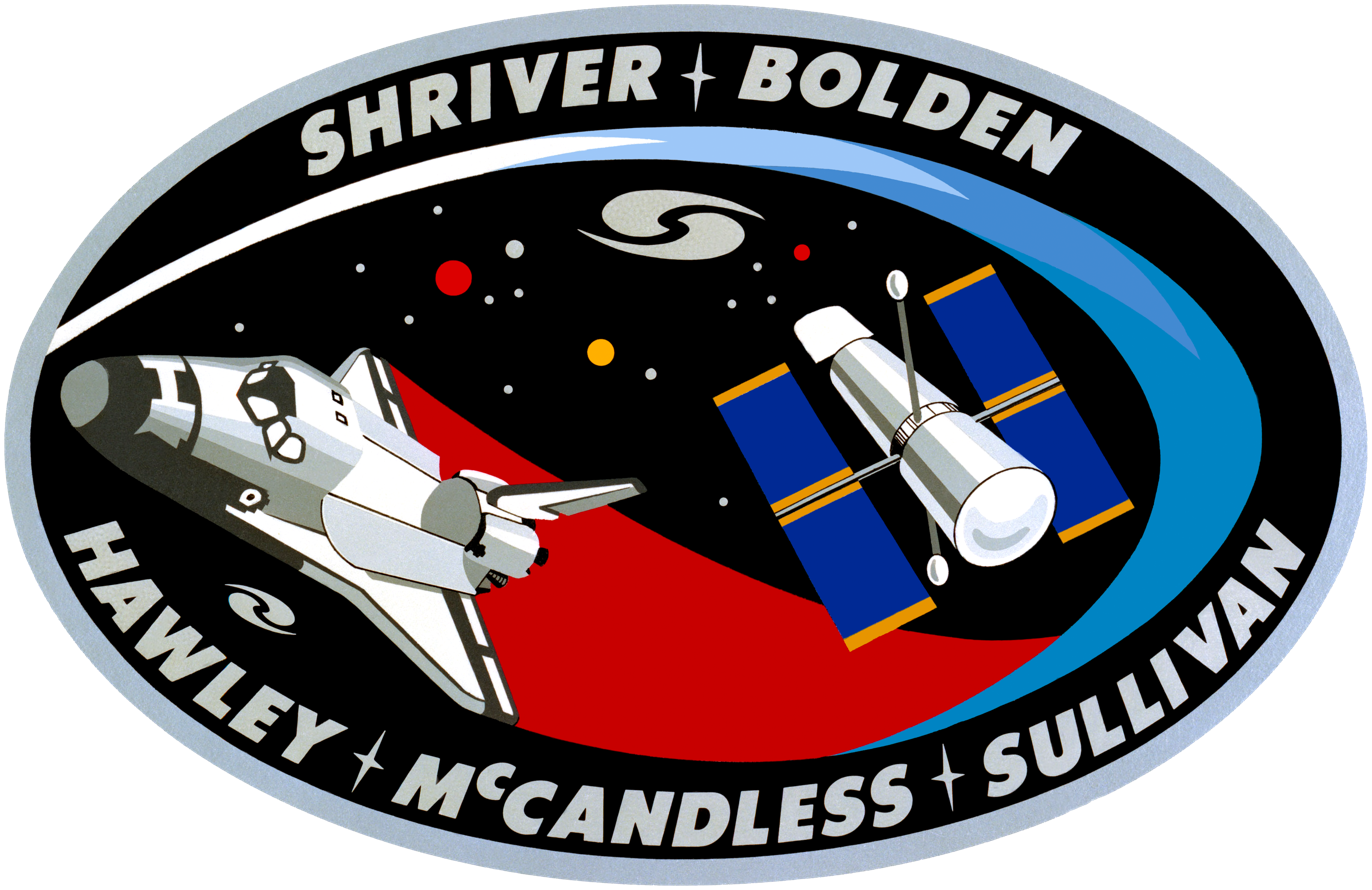
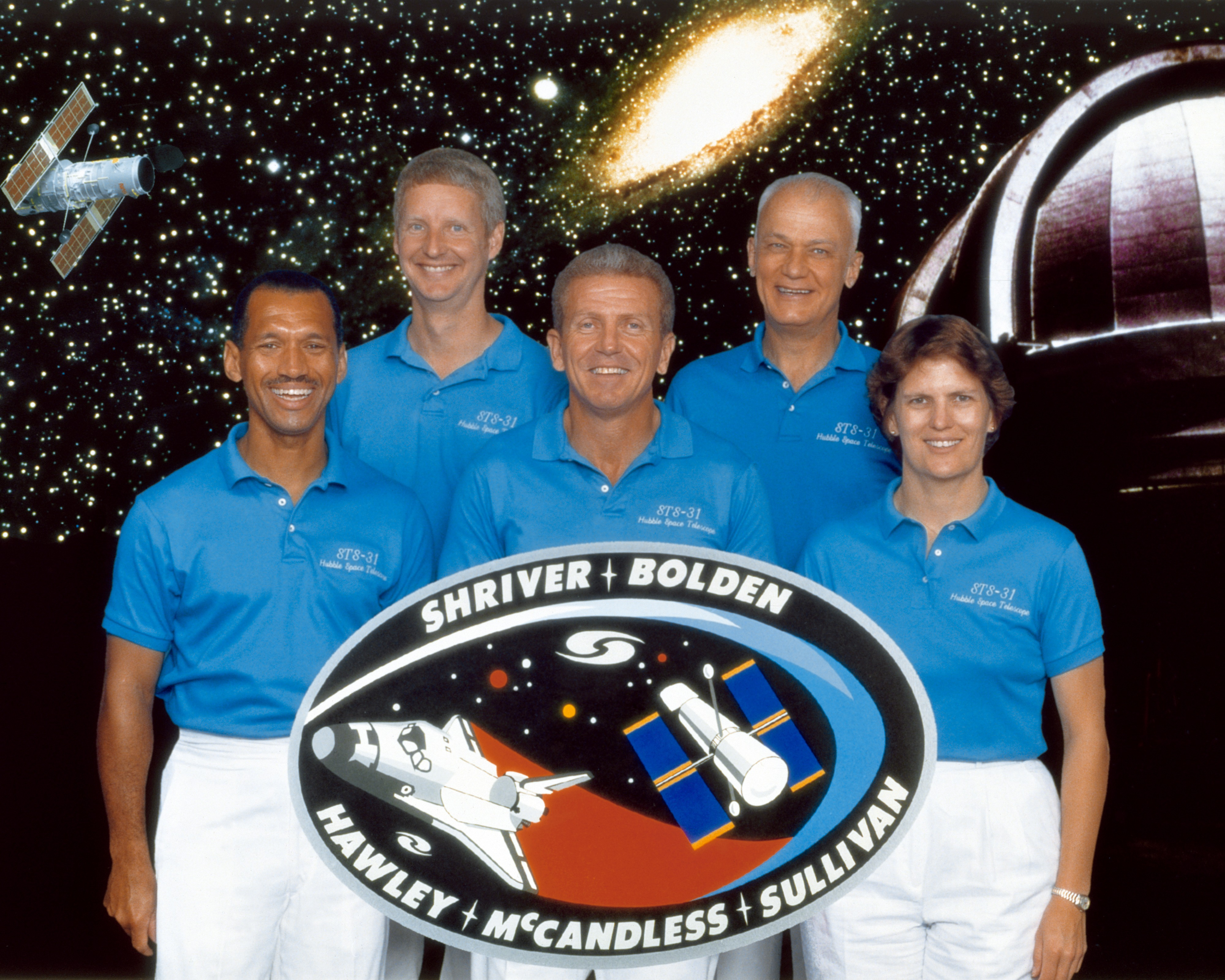
- STS-31 mission patch From left: Bolden, Hawley, Shriver, McCandless and Sullivan Space Shuttle program Hubble Space Telescope missions

STS-31 was the 35th mission of NASA's Space Shuttle program and the tenth flight of the Space Shuttle Discovery. The primary purpose of this mission was the deployment of the Hubble Space Telescope (HST) into low Earth orbit. Discovery lifted off from Launch Complex 39B on April 24, 1990, from Kennedy Space Center, Florida.

Following the Challenger accident, clarification was required on mission numbering. As STS-51-L was also designated STS-33, future flights with the previous STS-26 through STS-33 designators would require the R in their documentation to avoid conflicts in tracking data from one mission to another.

Discovery's crew deployed the Hubble Space Telescope on April 25, 1990, and then spent the rest of the mission tending to various scientific experiments in the Shuttle's payload bay as well as operating a set of IMAX cameras to record the mission. Discovery's launch marked the first time since January 1986 that two Space Shuttles had been on the launch pad at the same time – Discovery on 39B and Columbia on 39A.

== Crew ==
| Position | Astronaut |
|---|---|
| Commander | Loren Shriver; Second spaceflight |
| Pilot | Charles Bolden; Second spaceflight |
| Mission Specialist 1 | Bruce McCandless II; Second and last spaceflight |
| Mission Specialist 2 Flight Engineer | Steven Hawley; Third spaceflight |
| Mission Specialist 3 | Kathryn D. Sullivan; Second spaceflight |

=== Crew seat assignments ===
| Seat | Launch | Landing | Seats 1–4 are on the flight deck. Seats 5–7 are on the mid-deck. |
| 1 | Shriver | | Seats 1–4 are on the flight deck. Seats 5–7 are on the mid-deck. |
| 2 | Bolden | | Seats 1–4 are on the flight deck. Seats 5–7 are on the mid-deck. |
| 3 | McCandless | Sullivan | Seats 1–4 are on the flight deck. Seats 5–7 are on the mid-deck. |
| 4 | Hawley | | Seats 1–4 are on the flight deck. Seats 5–7 are on the mid-deck. |
| 5 | Sullivan | McCandless | Seats 1–4 are on the flight deck. Seats 5–7 are on the mid-deck. |
| 6 | Unused | | Seats 1–4 are on the flight deck. Seats 5–7 are on the mid-deck. |
| 7 | Unused | | Seats 1–4 are on the flight deck. Seats 5–7 are on the mid-deck. |

=== Crew notes ===
This mission was originally to be flown in August 1986 as STS-61-J using Atlantis, but was postponed due to the Challenger disaster. John W. Young was originally assigned to command this mission, which would have been his seventh spaceflight, but was reassigned to an administrative position and was replaced by Loren J. Shriver in 1988.

== Mission highlights ==
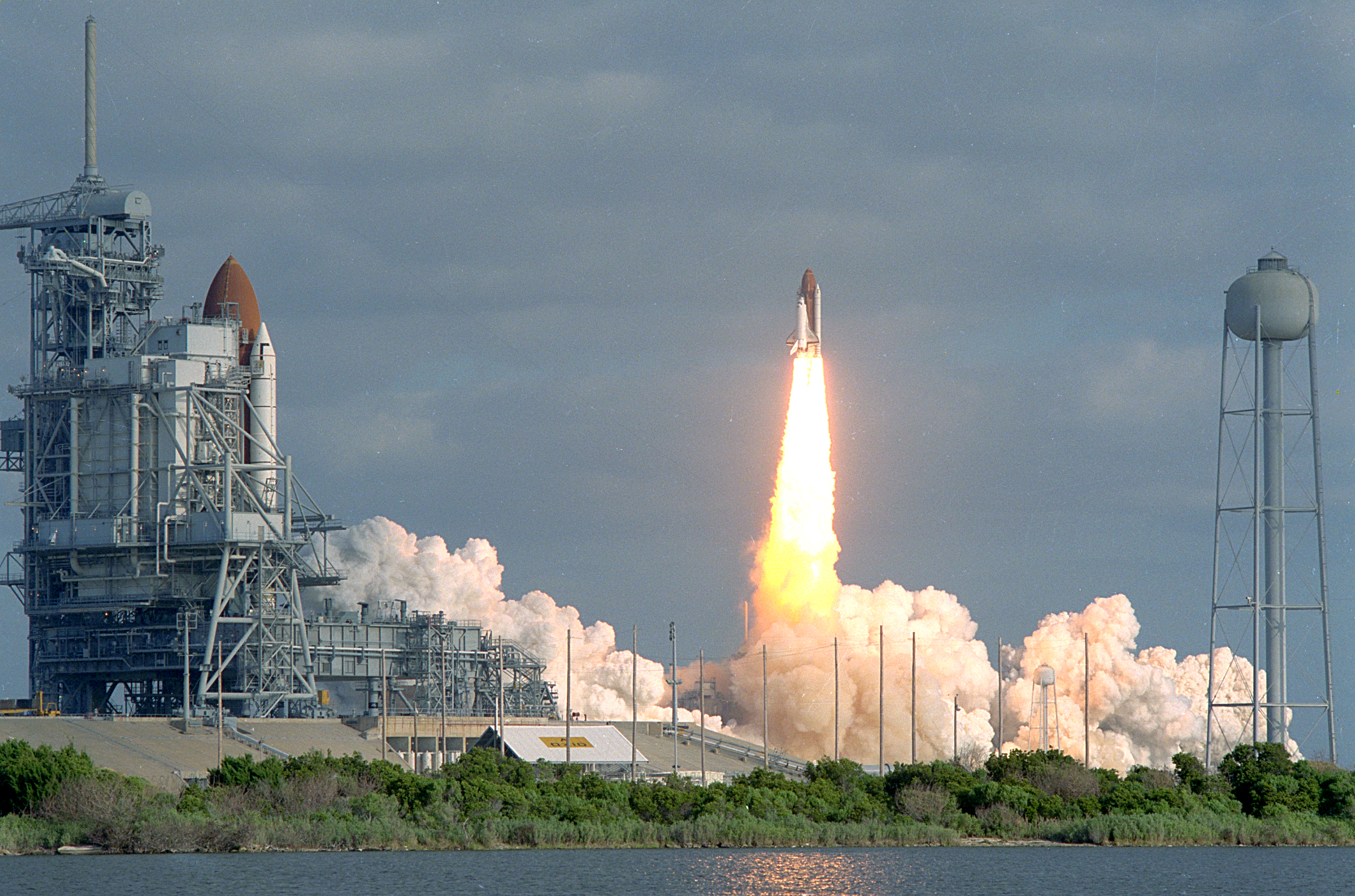
Space Shuttle Discovery launches from LC-39B for STS-31 with Columbia on LC-39A in preparation for STS-35.

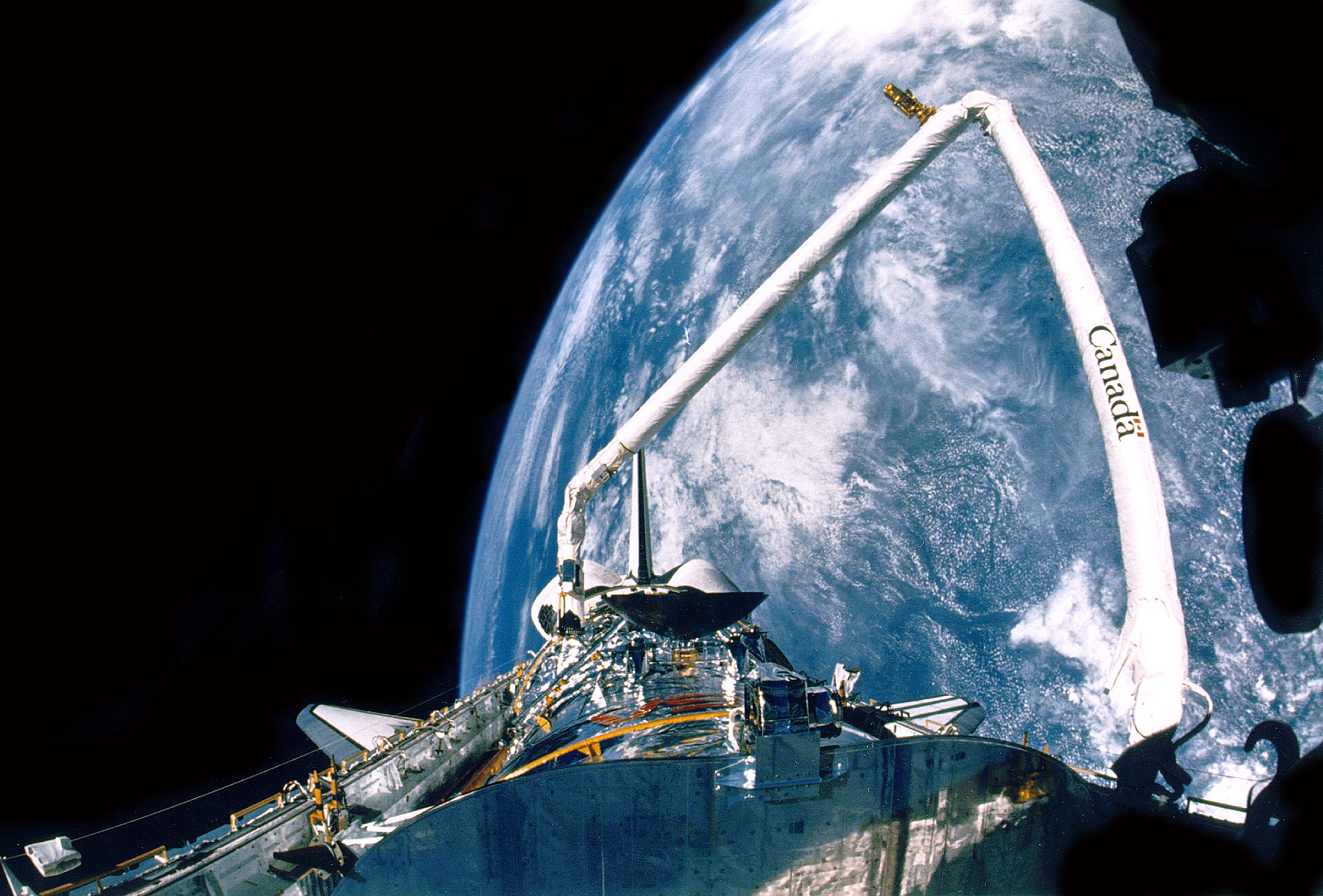
Hubble Space Telescope in the cargo bay of Discovery

STS-31 was launched on April 24, 1990, at 12:33:51 UTC (8:33:51 am EDT, local time at the launch site). A launch attempt on April 10, 1990, was scrubbed at T−4 minutes for a faulty valve in auxiliary power unit (APU) number one. The APU was eventually replaced, and the Hubble Space Telescope's batteries were recharged. On launch day, the countdown was briefly halted at T−31 seconds when Discovery's computers failed to shut down a fuel valve line on ground support equipment. Engineers manually commanded the valve to close and the countdown continued.

The main purpose of this mission was to deploy Hubble. It was designed to operate above the Earth's turbulent and obscuring atmosphere to observe celestial objects at ultraviolet, visible and near-infrared wavelengths. The Hubble mission was a joint NASA-ESA (European Space Agency) effort going back to the late 1970s. The rest of the mission was devoted to photography and onboard experiments. To launch HST into an orbit that guaranteed longevity, Discovery entered an orbit of around 613 × 615 km (381 × 382 mi). At one point during the mission, Discovery briefly reached an apogee of 621 km (386 mi), the highest altitude ever reached by a Shuttle orbiter. The record height also permitted the crew to photograph Earth's large-scale geographic features not apparent from lower orbits. Motion pictures were recorded by two IMAX cameras, and the results appeared in the 1994 IMAX film Destiny in Space. Experiments on the mission included a biomedical technology study, advanced materials research, particle contamination and ionizing radiation measurements, and a student science project studying zero-gravity effects on electronic arcs. Discovery's reentry from its higher-than-usual orbit required a deorbit burn of 4 minutes and 58 seconds, the longest in Shuttle history up to that time. Discovery orbited the Earth 80 times during the mission.

During the deployment of Hubble, one of the observatory's solar arrays stopped as it unfurled. While ground controllers searched for a way to command HST to unreel the solar array, Mission Specialists McCandless and Sullivan began preparing for a contingency spacewalk in the event that the array could not be deployed through ground control. The array eventually came free and unfurled through ground control while McCandless and Sullivan were pre-breathing inside the partially depressurized airlock.

Secondary payloads included the IMAX Cargo Bay Camera (ICBC) to document operations outside the crew cabin and a handheld IMAX camera for use inside the orbiter. Also included were the Ascent Particle Monitor (APM) to detect particulate matter in the payload bay; a Protein Crystal Growth (PCG) experiment to provide data on growing protein crystals in microgravity, Radiation Monitoring Equipment III (RME III) to measure gamma ray levels in the crew cabin; Investigations into Polymer Membrane Processing (IPMP) to determine porosity control in the microgravity environment, and an Air Force Maui Optical Site (AMOS) experiment.

The mission marked the flight of an 5 kg (11 lb) human skull, which served as the primary element of "Detailed Secondary Objective 469", also known as the In-flight Radiation Dose Distribution (IDRD) experiment. This joint NASA/DoD experiment was designed to examine the penetration of radiation into the human cranium during spaceflight. The female skull was seated in a plastic matrix, representative of tissue, and sliced into ten layers. Hundreds of thermo-luminescent dosimeters were mounted in the skull's layers to record radiation levels at multiple depths. This experiment, which also flew on STS-28 and STS-36, was located in the shuttle's mid-deck lockers on all three flights, recording radiation levels at different orbital inclinations.

Discovery landed on Runway 22 at Edwards Air Force Base in California on April 29, 1990, at 13:49:57 UTC (6:49:57 am PDT, local time at the landing site). The landing had a rollout distance of 2,705 m (8,875 ft), took 61 seconds, and marked the first use of carbon brakes on a shuttle. Discovery was returned to Kennedy Space Center after STS-31 on May 7, 1990.

| Attempt | Planned | Result | Turnaround | Reason | Decision point | Weather go (%) | Notes |
|---|---|---|---|---|---|---|---|
| 1 | 10 Apr 1990, 8:47:00 am | Scrubbed | — | Technical | (T−4:00) | | Faulty valve in auxiliary power unit. |
| 2 | 24 Apr 1990, 8:33:51 am | Successful | 13 days 23 hours 47 minutes | | | | Countdown was held at T−0:31 when a fuel valve line on ground support equipment failed to shut automatically. The valve was shut manually and the countdown was resumed. |

== Wake-up calls ==
NASA began a tradition of playing music to astronauts during the Project Gemini, which was first used to wake up a flight crew during Apollo 15. Each track is specially chosen, often by their families, and usually has a special meaning to an individual member of the crew, or is applicable to their daily activities.

| Flight Day | Song | Artist/Composer |
|---|---|---|
| Day 2 | "Space is Our World" | Private Numbers |
| Day 3 | "Shout" | Otis Day and the Knights |
| Day 4 | "Kokomo" | Beach Boys |
| Day 5 | "Cosmos" | Frank Hayes |
| Day 6 | "Rise and Shine" | Raffi |

== Gallery ==
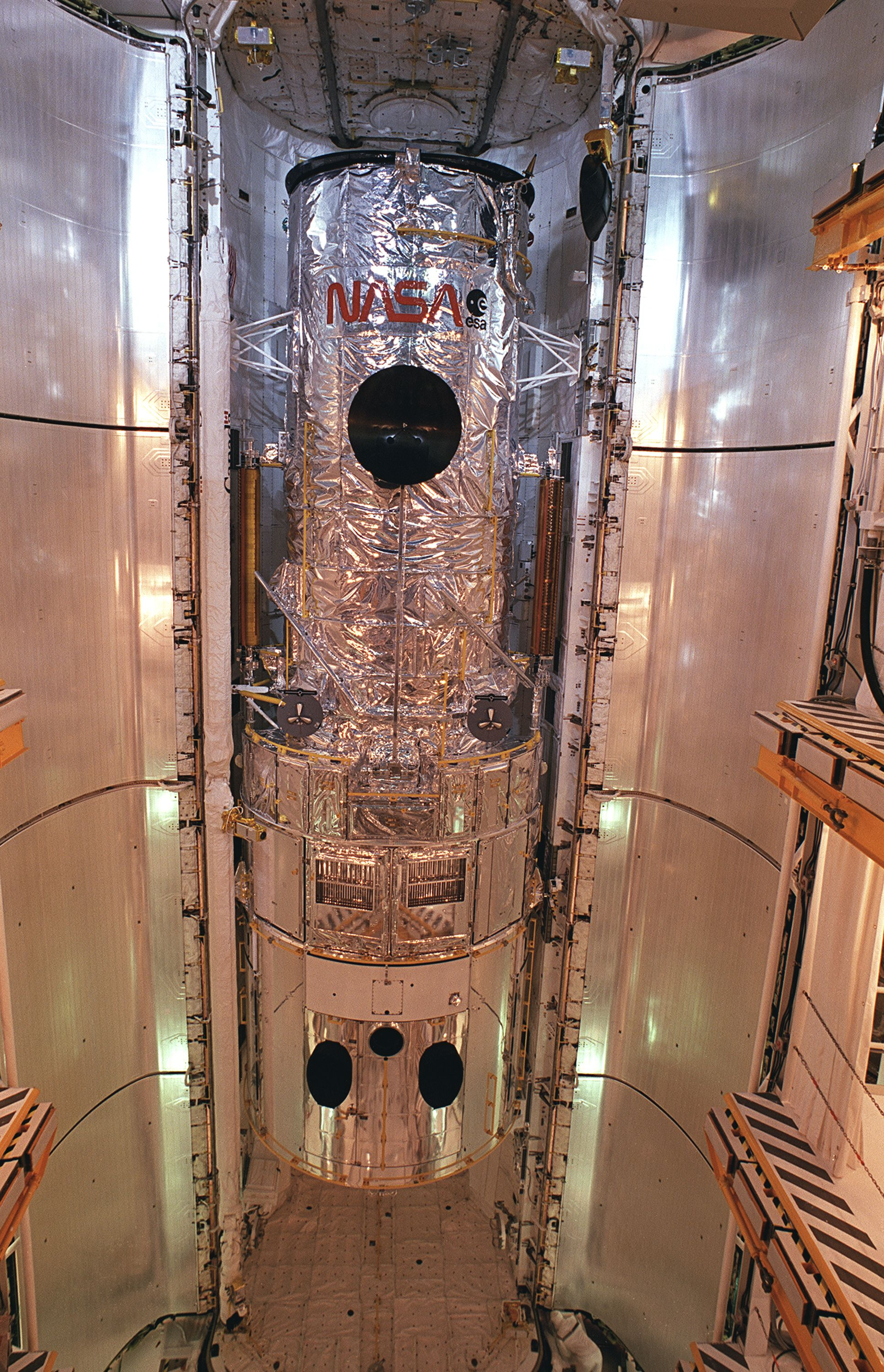
Hubble at the pad

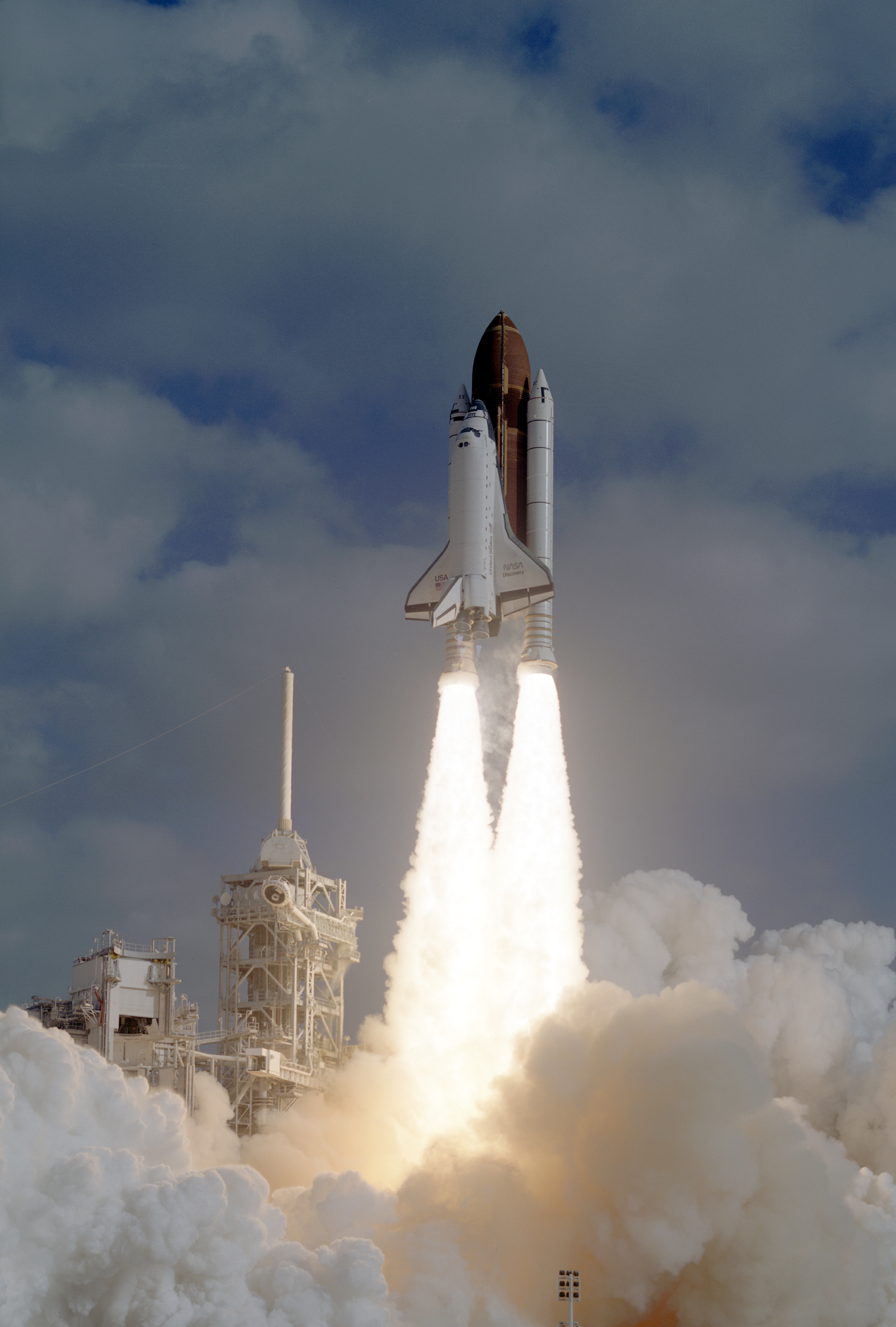
Liftoff of Discovery with the Hubble Space Telescope on board

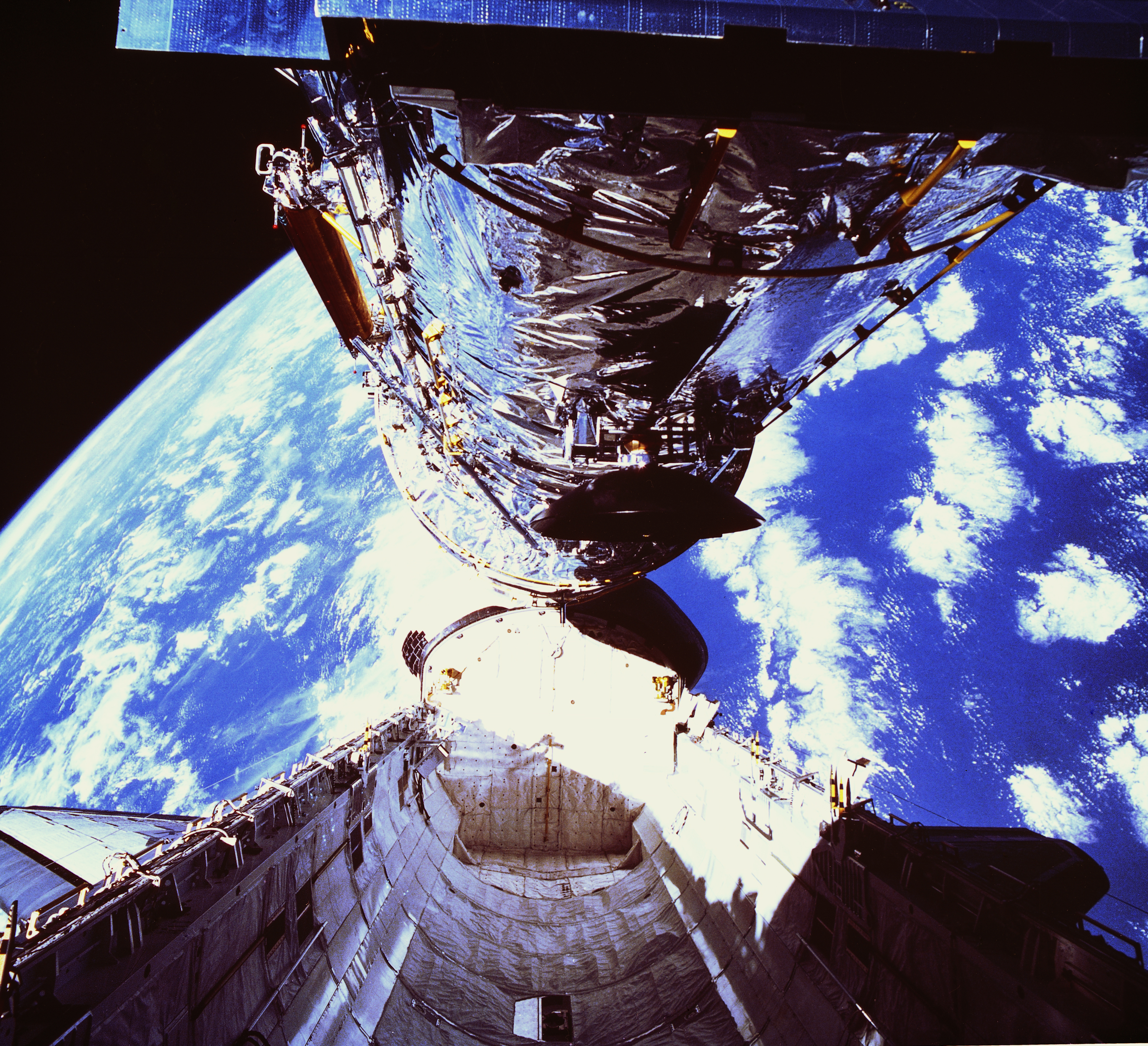
Low hover position

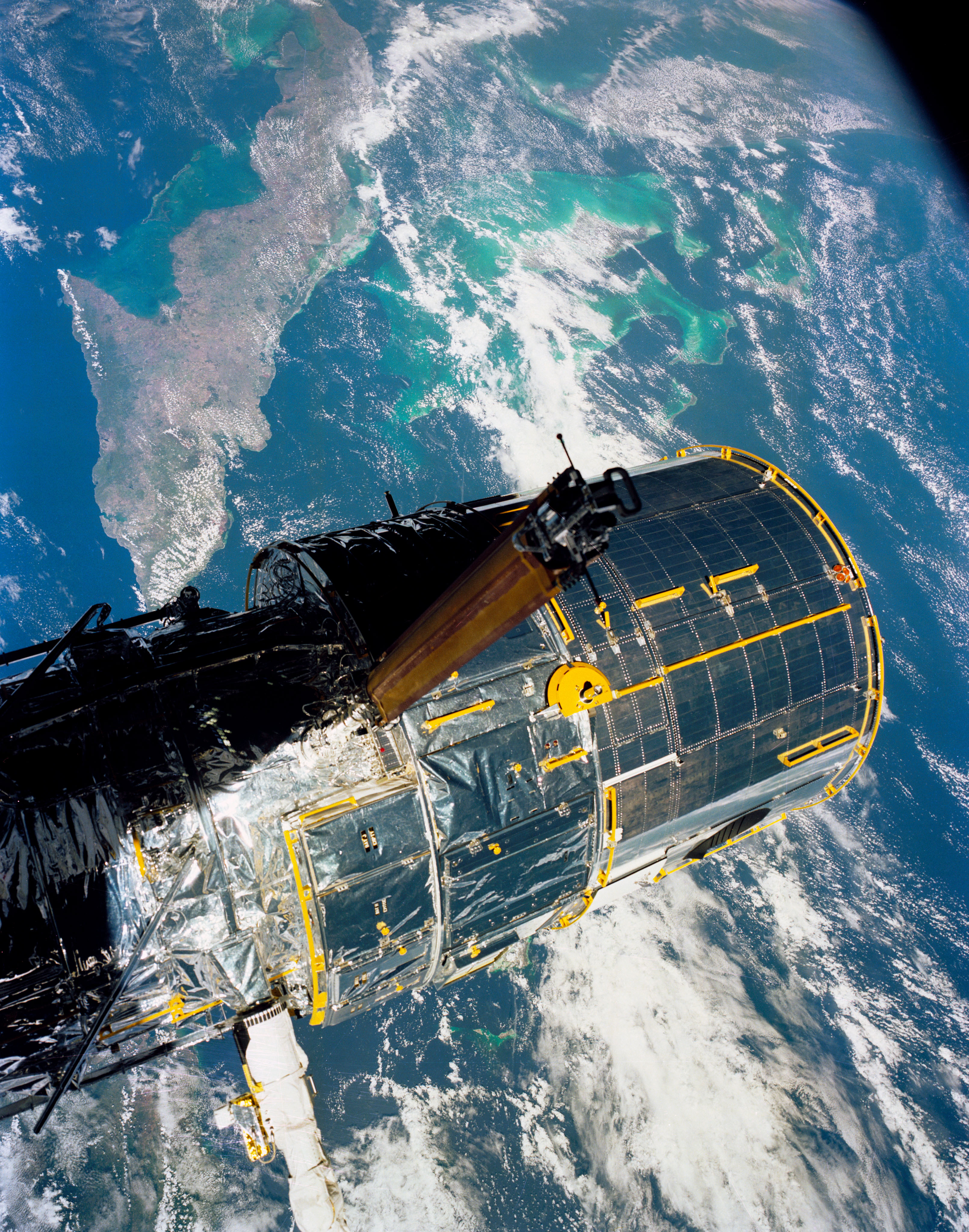
High over Cuba

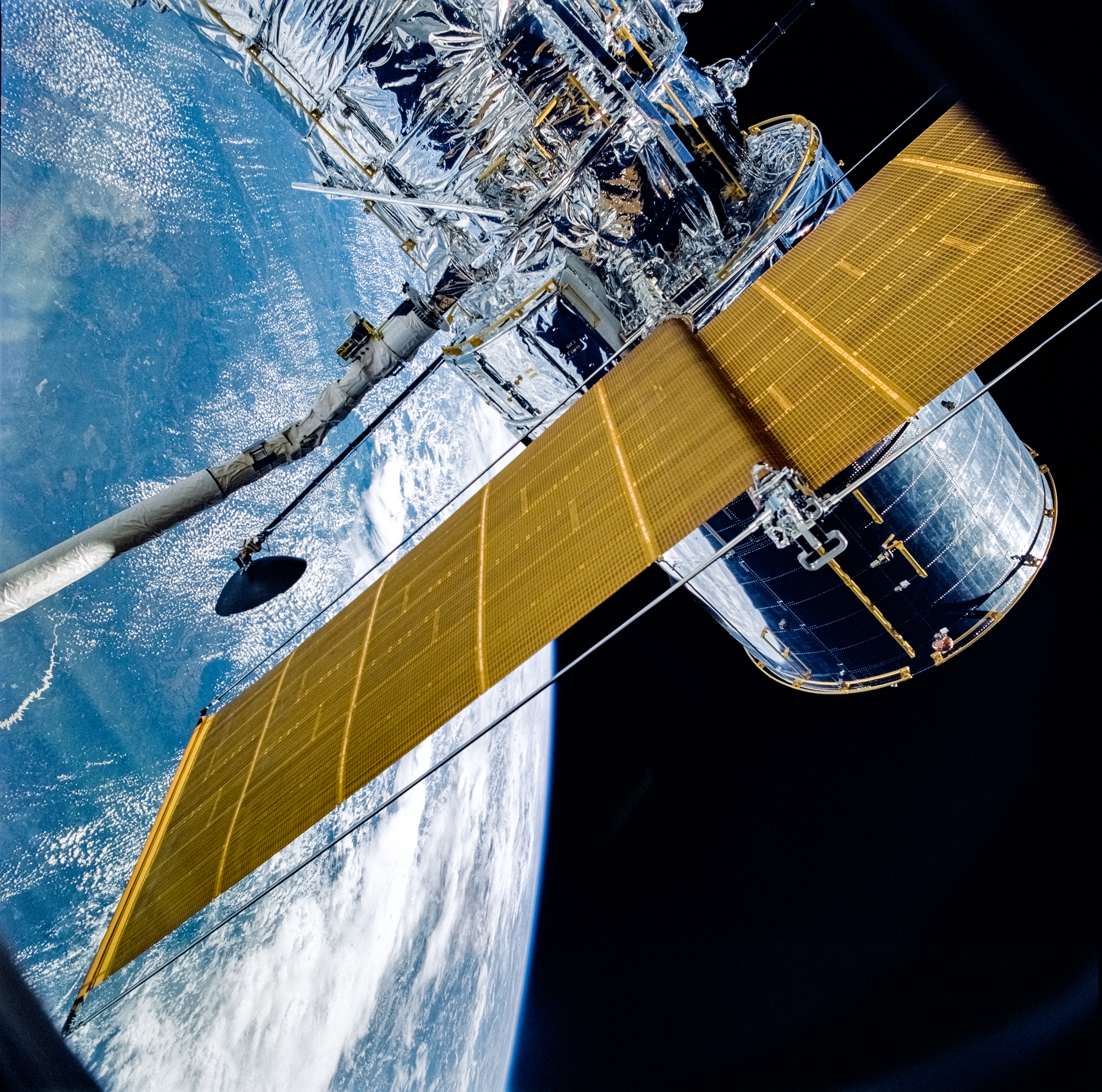
Solar array deployment

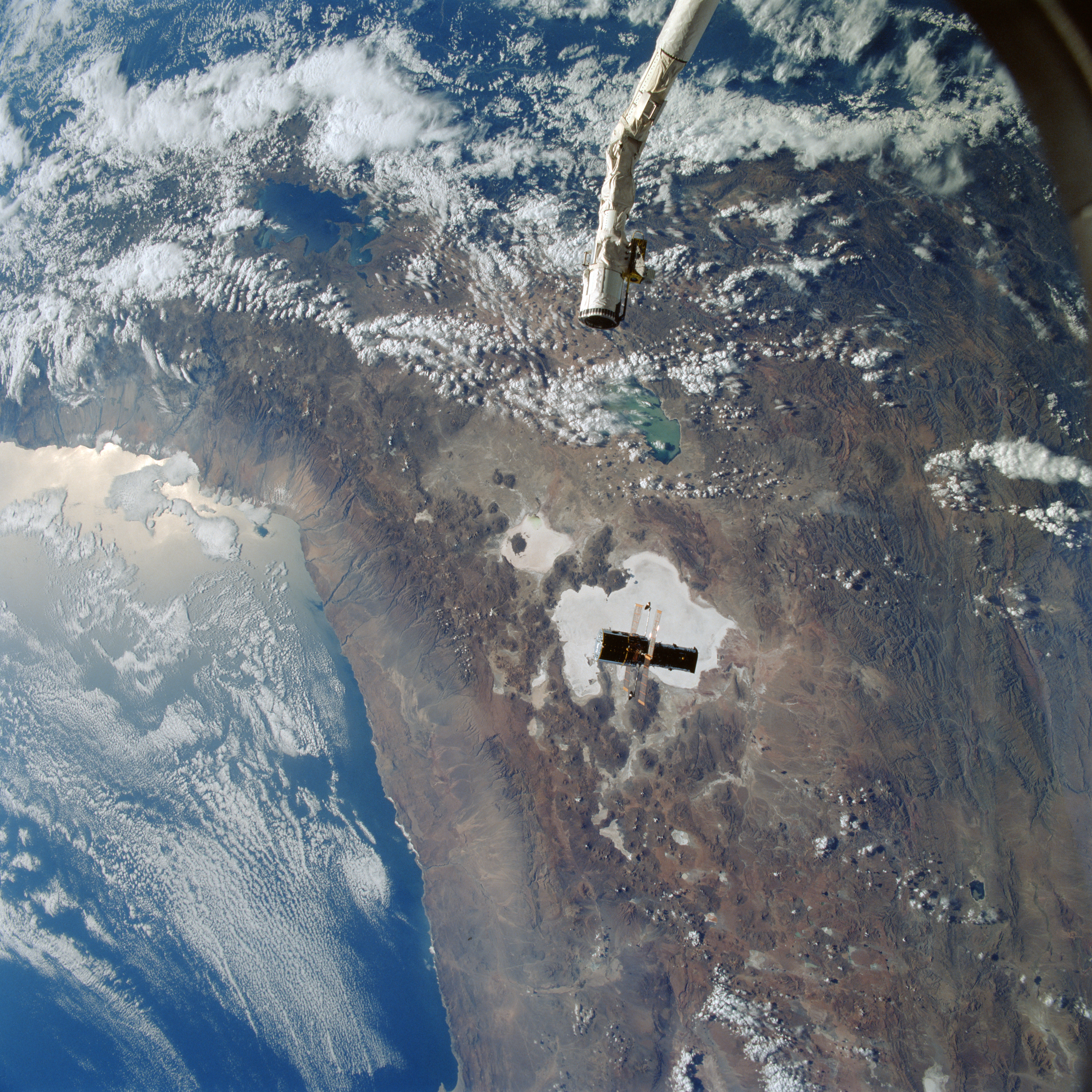
Hubble drifts away over Peru.

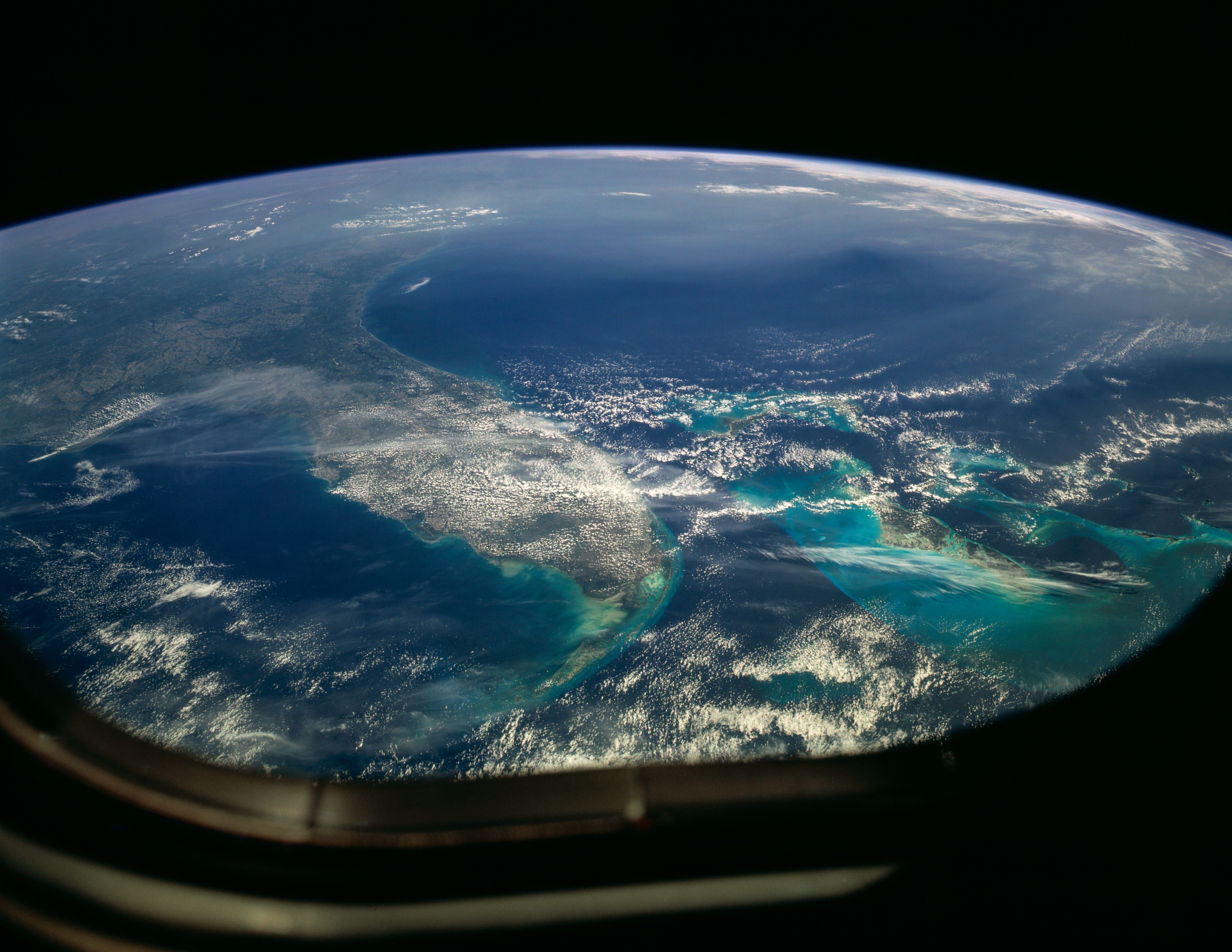
Florida and The Bahamas

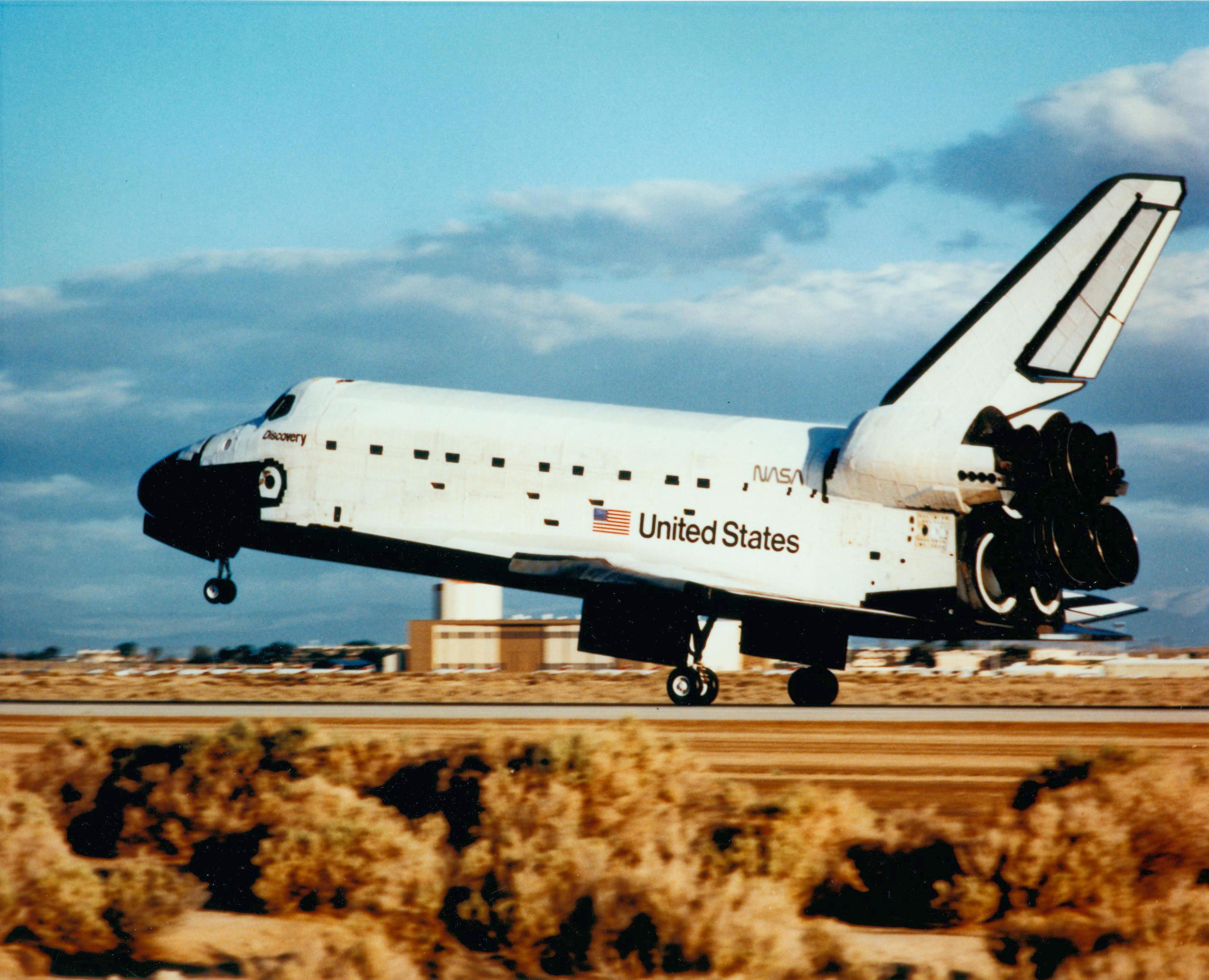
Discovery returns home.

== See also ==
- List of human spaceflights
- List of Space Shuttle missions
- Outline of space science
- Space Shuttle
