= Cloud-based design and manufacturing =

Cloud-based design and manufacturing (CBDM) refers to a service-oriented networked product development model in which service consumers are able to configure products or services and reconfigure manufacturing systems through Infrastructure-as-a-Service (IaaS), Platform-as-a-Service (PaaS), Hardware-as-a-Service (HaaS), and Software-as-a-Service (SaaS). Adapted from the original cloud computing paradigm and introduced into the realm of computer-aided product development, Cloud-Based Design and Manufacturing is gaining significant momentum and attention from both academia and industry.

Cloud-based design and manufacturing includes two aspects: cloud-based design and cloud-based manufacturing. Another related concept is cloud manufacturing that is more general and popular.

Cloud-Based Design (CBD) refers to a networked design model that leverages cloud computing, service-oriented architecture (SOA), Web 2.0 (e.g., social network sites), and semantic web technologies to support cloud-based engineering design services in distributed and collaborative environments.

Cloud-Based Manufacturing (CBM) refers to a networked manufacturing model that exploits on-demand access to a shared collection of diversified and distributed manufacturing resources to form temporary, reconfigurable production lines which enhance efficiency, reduce product lifecycle costs, and allow for optimal resource allocation in response to variable-demand customer generated tasking.

The enabling technologies for Cloud-Based Design and Manufacturing include cloud computing, Web 2.0, Internet of Things (IoT), and service-oriented architecture (SOA).

== History ==
The term cloud-based design and manufacturing (CBDM) was initially coined by Dazhong Wu, David Rosen, and Dirk Schaefer at Georgia Tech in 2012 for the purpose of articulating a new paradigm for digital manufacturing and design innovation in distributed and collaborative settings. The main objective of CBDM is to further reduce time and cost associated with maintaining information and communication technology (ICT) infrastructures for design and manufacturing, enhancing digital manufacturing and design innovation in distributed and collaborative environments, and adapting to rapidly changing market demands.

In 2014, the same research group also published the worldwide first two books on the subjects of Cloud-Based Design and Manufacturing (CBDM) and Social Product Development (SPD) with Springer, edited by Dirk Schaefer.

== Characteristics ==
CBDM exhibits the following key characteristics:

- Cloud-based distributed file system
- High performance computing
- Cloud-based social collaboration
- Ubiquitous access to distributed big data
- Rapid manufacturing scalability
- Agility
- On-demand self-service
- Semantic Web
- Real-time request for quotation
- Pay-per-use pricing model
- Multi-tenancy

CBDM differs from traditional collaborative and distributed design and manufacturing systems such as web-based systems and agent-based systems from a number of perspectives, including (1) computing architecture, (2) data storage, (3) sourcing process, (4) information and communication technology infrastructure, (5) business model, (6) programming model, and (7) communication.

== Service models ==
- Infrastructure as a service (IaaS)
- Platform as a service (PaaS)
- Hardware as a service (HaaS)
- Software as a service (SaaS)

Similar to cloud computing, CBDM services can be categorized into four major deployment models: the public cloud, private cloud, hybrid cloud, and community cloud.

== Research progress in Academia ==
- The Defense Advanced Research Projects Agency (DARPA) MENTOR program
- Engineering and Physical Sciences Research Council cloud manufacturing program
- European Commission's Seventh Framework Program (EC FP7)

== See also ==
- Cloud computing
- Cloud manufacturing
- Cyber-physical system
- Systems engineering
- Distributed manufacturing
- Mass collaboration
- Cloud collaboration
- Industry 4.0
