= Society 5.0 =

Concept for a future society created by a new industrial revolution

- ソサエティー5.0
- Emblem of the Government of Japan

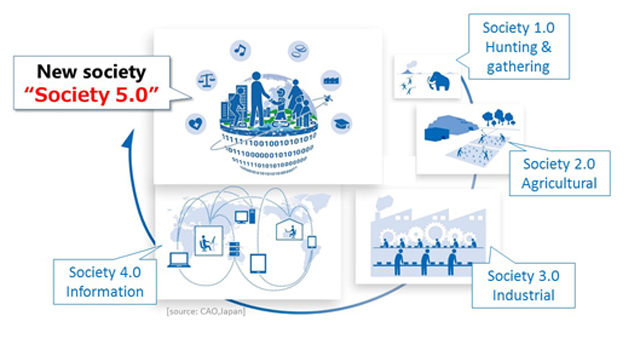
- Government of Japan graphic for Society 5.0

Strategic Policy Initiative overview
- Formed: January 22, 2016; 10 years ago
- Preceding Strategic Policy Initiative: Fifth Science and Technology Basic Plan
- Jurisdiction: Government of Japan
- Headquarters: Tokyo, Japan
- Motto: "A Super Smart Society"
- Prime Minister responsible: Shinzo Abe (at launch), Former Prime Minister of Japan
- Strategic Policy Initiative executive: Cabinet Office Council for Science, Technology and Innovation, Initiating Body
- Parent department: Cabinet Office of Japan
- Website: www8.cao.go.jp/cstp/english/society5_0/index.html

Society 5.0, also known as the "Super Smart Society", is a concept that was firstly outlined and closely described in the Report on the Fifth Science and Technology Basic Plan, which was written by the Cabinet of Japan's Cabinet Office’s Council for Science, Technology and Innovation, and bestowed to the Japanese government, on 18 December 2015. It aims to use advanced technologies such as artificial intelligence to address societal challenges and enhance economic productivity across various sectors of everyday life.

Building on the Fourth Industrial Revolution, the concept of Society 5.0 was officially made public by the Cabinet of Japan's Cabinet Office’s Council for Science, Technology and Innovation. The initiative was formally presented by former Prime Minister Shinzo Abe in 2019 as a part of the Fifth Science and Technology Basic Plan. It emphasizes the integration of cyberspace and physical space.

== Objective ==
The objective of Society 5.0, as endorsed by the Japanese Cabinet Office, is for Japanese society to shift towards a more resilient and sustainable society that protects its citizens. The Cabinet Office of the Government of Japan describes Society 5.0 as an initiative aimed at ensuring safety, security, and well-being for individuals. The Cabinet Office states that to do this they will use cyberspace fused with physical space and human-centered values, and that every aspect of society will restructured in cyberspace.

== History ==
The term "Society 5.0" refers to a proposed fifth stage of human following the hunter-gatherer society (Society 1.0), the agrarian society (Society 2.0), the industrial society (Society 3.0), and the information society (Society 4.0). The concept envisions a society that uses digital transformation technologies to solve social problems and improve quality of life.

=== Society 1.0 (Hunting Society) ===
In anthropology, a hunter-gatherer society is a society dependent on hunting wild animals and gathering fruits and plants for sustenance. Anthropologists propose that all human societies followed a hunter-gatherer lifestyle until the advent of agriculture during the Neolithic period.

=== Society 2.0 (Agricultural Society) ===
An agrarian society is a societal structure where the economy primarily relies on agriculture. The origins of agrarian societies are associated with the Neolithic Revolution, also known as the First Agricultural Revolution, which occurred during the Neolithic or Stone Age. These societies have existed in various parts of the world for thousands of years.

=== Society 3.0 (Industrial Society) ===
An industrial society is one that has undergone significant industrialization. Industrial societies often develop from agrarian societies and are characterized by technological advancements across various fields.

=== Society 4.0 (Information Society) ===
An information society is a society in which activities related to the utilization, generation, dissemination, and incorporation of information hold considerable importance. Key factors enabling this phenomenon are information and communication technologies, which have contributed to the development of automated machines and robots impacting industry and information management.

== Technological applications ==
A report by Japan's National Institute of Advanced Industrial Science and Technology lists the following six topics as basic technologies for realizing Society 5.0:

- Technology for enhancing human capabilities, fostering sensitivity and enabling control within Cyber-Physical Systems (CPS).
- AI hardware technology and AI application systems.
- Self-developing security technology for AI applications.
- Highly efficient network technology along with advanced information input and output devices.
- Next-generation manufacturing system technology designed to facilitate mass customization.
- New measurement technology tailored for digital manufacturing processes.

The Japan Business Federation (Keidanren) initiated "Society 5.0 for SDGs" in alignment with the United Nations' Sustainable Development Goals (SDGs), citing compatibility between the concepts.

== See also ==
- Cyber manufacturing
- List of emerging technologies
- Digital modelling and fabrication
- Computer-integrated manufacturing
- Industrial control system
- Simulation software
- Technological singularity
- Work 4.0
- World Economic Forum
