= Unified-Inbox =

Singaporean Internet of Things company

- Type: Startup
- Industry: IoT, AI
- Founded: February 6, 2014; 12 years ago, Singapore
- Products: Software
- Number of employees: 50-100 (2020)
- Website: uib.ai

Unified-Inbox is an Internet of Things (IoT) messaging company founded in 2010 and based in Singapore. The company is known for developing AI algorithms that incorporate text messages on to appliances for smart homes, smart cities, and different types of industries including enterprise manufacturing intelligence and Industry 4.0.
