= Cyber manufacturing =

Concept derived from cyber-physical systems

Cyber manufacturing is a concept derived from cyber-physical systems (CPS) that refers to a modern manufacturing approach aiming to provide an information-transparent environment. This approach attempts to support asset management, enabling reconfiguration, and maintaining productivity. In contrast to an alternative, experience-based management systems, cyber manufacturing intends to establish an evidence-based environment, informing equipment users about networked asset status and translating raw data into risk assessments and actionable information. Key technologies include the design of cyber-physical systems and the combination of engineering domain knowledge with computer sciences and information technologies. Among these are mobile applications for manufacturing, which are of interest to both industry and academia.

== Technology ==
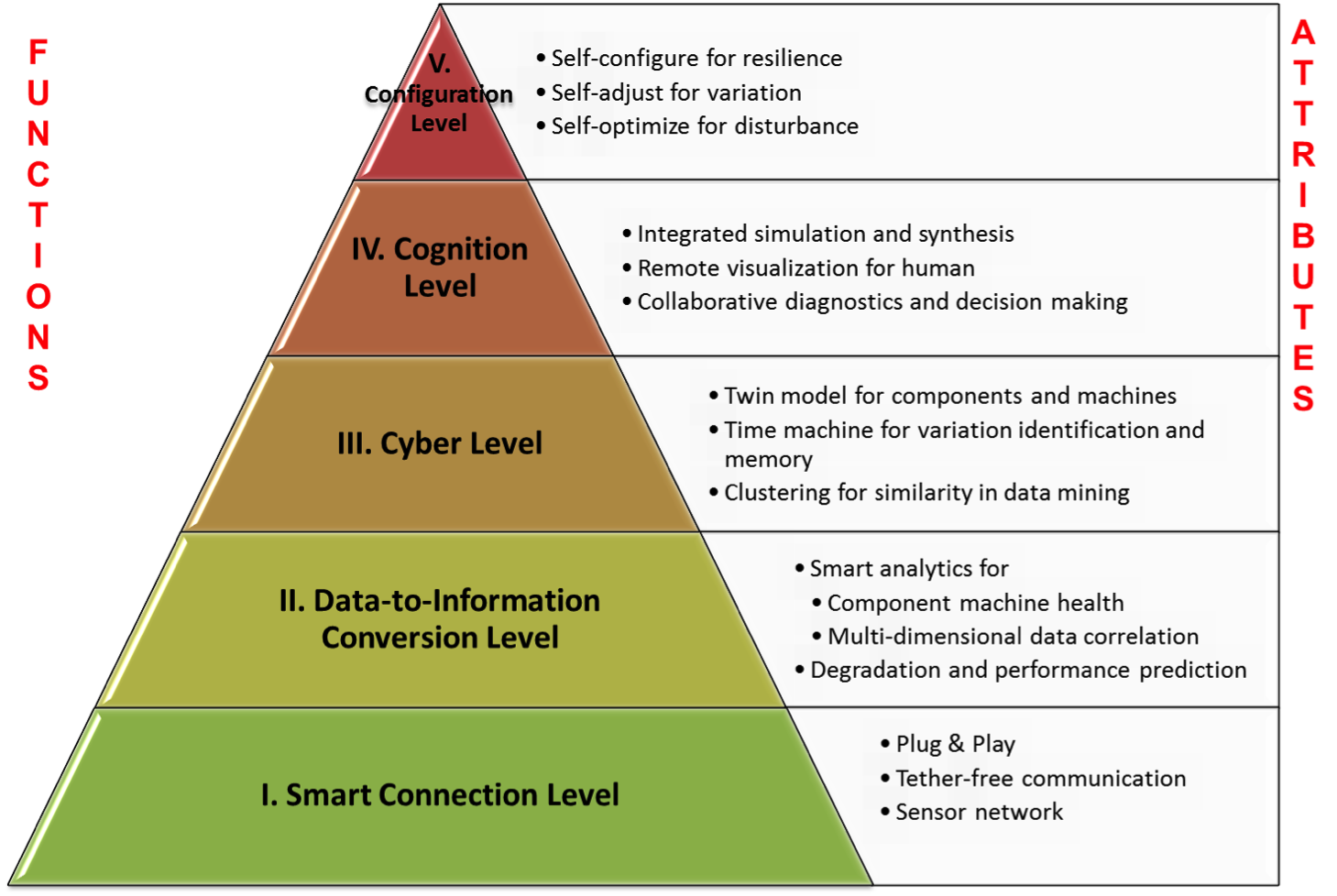

Several technologies are involved in developing cyber-manufacturing solutions. The following is a short description of these technologies and their involvement in cyber-manufacturing.

- Cyber-physical systems are the low level systems, like sensors and controllers. These are important for the system to run.
- Big Data Analytics is the other significant technology participating in design and the development of cyber-manufacturing systems. Connected machines raise the issue of proper data handling, processing and cyber-manufacturing is not an exemption. Customized developments in cloud computing, artificial intelligence and predictive analytics are applicable in cyber-manufacturing.

== Development ==
In 2013, the Office of Naval Research in the US Military has issued a proposal solicitation subjected for cyber-manufacturing.

== See also ==
- Big Data
- Industry 4.0
- Intelligent Maintenance Systems
- Computer security
- Print on demand
- Distributed manufacturing
- Prosumer
- Internet of things
- Automation
- Crowdsourcing
- In-product communication
- Cloud manufacturing
- Mass customization
- Supply chain network
- Global production network
- Computer-aided design
- Computer-aided engineering
- Resource allocation
- Peer production
- Cybernetics & feedback
