= Intelligent transformation =

Transforming processes with smart IT

Intelligent transformation is the process of deriving better business and societal outcomes by leveraging smart devices, big data, artificial intelligence, and cloud technologies. Intelligent transformation can facilitate firms in gaining recognition from external investors, thereby enhancing their market image and attracting larger consumers who are more eager to collaborate. Conversely, intelligent transformation can foster the development of more interactive and multidimensional value-creation models while optimizing the conventional organizational model.

== Process ==
Intelligent transformation takes place where devices and data center infrastructure work together to create end-to-end solutions. It addresses the needs of a customer and improves the performance of individual vertical industries. This takes place by leveraging big data analytics, machine learning, cloud computing, edge computing, and artificial intelligence.

Intelligent transformation typically involves three capabilities. On the front end, there needs to be smart devices, or sensors and modules in the field to generate the information to be analyzed, a process called Smart Internet of Things (SIoT). On the back-end, data center infrastructure processes the information and through algorithms, generate patterns and insights. This is called smart infrastructure. The final is called smart vertical and takes place once the data for specific use cases to be addressed.

The more use cases a vendor is able to address, the more quickly that it will likely become the leading provider of intelligent solutions to a particular industry.

== Use cases and industry recognition ==
There are multiple uses cases for smart manufacturing. In the healthcare industry, intelligent transformation can help to develop the next generation of radiology tools and help surgeons create more precise analytics for pathology images. For example, advanced machine learning methods developed can achieve more accurate demand forecast in certain scenarios.

Predix Asset Performance Management from General Electric is designed to optimize the performance of assets. Its goal is to increase reliability and availability and also minimize costs.

Microsoft incorporates intelligent transformation in its Surface Hub 2 digital whiteboard for smart office by integrating hardware and software solutions together. Features developed through intelligent transformation include a 4K camera for Skype, 4 screen tilling, and incorporation of collaboration tools such as Windows, Office, and Skype.

Intelligent transformation is used by Lenovo in various products such as smart speakers, smart watches and smart displays which use various AI technology. Smart devices would include Smart PC Yoga S940 by Lenovo which uses AI technologies to detect user attention and protect work privacy by automatically adjusting the display background. Smart infrastructure would include ThinkAgile Software Defined Infrastructure which is optimized for a variety of workloads and designed to provide more efficient resource allocation to support business growth. An example of vertical use case would include DaystAR for remote monitoring of airline maintenance process, which has been applied to manufacturing and aviation.

Intelligent transformation is also used by LiveTiles to create employee and customer-facing chatbots powered by Microsoft natural language. Amazon Go is another example and uses computer vision, sensor fusion and deep learning to detect when products are taken off the shelf and then places them in a "virtual shopping cart" for checkout.

== See also ==
- Intelligent maintenance system
