= Radha Poovendran =

Radha Poovendran is a Professor of electrical and computer engineering at the University of Washington in Seattle. He served as the chair of the Department of Electrical & Computer Engineering. He is the founding director of the Network Security Lab (NSL@UW). He was named a Fellow of the Institute of Electrical and Electronics Engineers (IEEE) in 2015 for his contributions to security in cyber-physical systems.
