= Distributed network =

Distributed network may refer to:

- Computer network
- Distributed computing
- Stand-alone power system

== See also ==
- Decentralization
- Distributed manufacturing
- Distributed social network
