= FedRAMP =

US government cybersecurity program

Agency overview
- Formed: 2011

The Federal Risk and Authorization Management Program (FedRAMP) is a United States federal government-wide compliance program that provides a standardized approach to security assessment, authorization, and continuous monitoring for cloud products and services. The US government describes FedRAMP as FISMA for the cloud.

The FedRAMP Program Management Office (PMO) mission is to promote the adoption of secure cloud services across the federal government by providing a standardized approach to security and risk assessment. Per the OMB memorandum, any cloud services that hold federal data must be FedRAMP authorized. FedRAMP prescribes the security requirements and processes that cloud service providers must follow in order for the government to use their service.

There are two ways to authorize a cloud service through FedRAMP: a Joint Authorization Board (JAB) provisional authorization (P-ATO), and through individual agencies.

FedRAMP provides accreditation for cloud services for the various cloud offering models which are Infrastructure as a Service (IaaS), Platform as a Service (PaaS), and Software as a Service, (SaaS).

== History ==
In 2011, the Office of Management and Budget (OMB) released a memorandum establishing FedRAMP "to provide a cost-effective, risk-based approach for the adoption and use of cloud services to Executive departments and agencies." The General Services Administration (GSA) established the FedRAMP PMO in June 2012.

Before the introduction of FedRAMP, individual federal agencies managed their own assessment methodologies following guidance set by the Federal Information Security Management Act of 2002.

== Governance and applicable laws ==
FedRAMP is governed by different Executive Branch entities that collaborate to develop, manage, and operate the program. These entities include:

- The Office of Management and Budget (OMB): The governing body that issued the FedRAMP policy memo, which defines the key requirements and capabilities of the program
- The Joint Authorization Board (JAB): The primary governance and decision-making body for FedRAMP comprises the chief information officers (CIOs) from the Department of Homeland Security (DHS), General Services Administration (GSA), and Department of Defense (DOD)
- The National Institute of Standards and Technology (NIST): Advises FedRAMP on FISMA compliance requirements and assists in developing the standards for the accreditation of independent 3PAOs
- The Department of Homeland Security (DHS): Manages the FedRAMP continuous monitoring strategy including data feed criteria, reporting structure, threat notification coordination, and incident response
- The Federal Chief Information Officers (CIO) Council: Disseminates FedRAMP information to Federal CIOs and other representatives through cross-agency communications and events
- The FedRAMP PMO: Established within GSA and responsible for the development of the FedRAMP program, including the management of day-to-day operations

There are several laws, mandates, and policies that are foundational to FedRAMP. FISMA–the Federal Information Security Modernization Act–requires that agencies authorize the information systems that they use. The US government describes FedRAMP as FISMA for the cloud. The FedRAMP Policy Memo requires federal agencies to use FedRAMP when assessing, authorizing, and continuously monitoring cloud services in order to aid agencies in the authorization process as well as save government resources and eliminate duplicative efforts. FedRAMP's security baselines are derived from NIST SP 800-53 (as revised) with a set of control enhancements that pertain to the unique security requirements of cloud computing.

== Third-party assessment organizations ==
Third-party assessment organizations (3PAOs) play a critical role in the FedRAMP security assessment process, as they are the independent assessment organizations that verify cloud providers' security implementations and provide the overall risk posture of a cloud environment for a security authorization decision. Accredited by the American Association for Laboratory Accreditation (A2LA), these assessment organizations must demonstrate independence and the technical competence required to test security implementations and collect representative evidence.

== FedRAMP Marketplace ==
The FedRAMP Marketplace provides a searchable, sortable database of Cloud Service Offerings (CSOs) that have achieved a FedRAMP designation. 3PAOs, accredited auditors that can perform the FedRAMP assessment, are listed within the Marketplace. The FedRAMP Marketplace is maintained by the FedRAMP Program Management Office (PMO).

== Security and authorization concerns ==
A 2026 ProPublica investigation found that FedRAMP entered into a partnership with Microsoft despite considerable concerns about the security of its cloud technology.

== See also ==
- Cloud computing issues
