= Nondestructive Evaluation 4.0 =

Concept of industrial testing and evaluation for the digital age

Nondestructive Evaluation 4.0 (NDE 4.0) has been defined by Vrana et al. as "the concept of cyber-physical non-destructive evaluation (including nondestructive testing) arising from Industry 4.0 digital technologies, physical inspection methods, and business models. It seeks to enhance inspection performance, integrity engineering and decision making for safety, sustainability, and quality assurance, as well as provide timely and relevant data to improve design, production, and maintenance characteristics."

NDE 4.0 arose in response to the emergence of the Fourth Industrial Revolution, which can be traced to the development of a high-tech strategy for the German government in 2015, under the term Industrie 4.0. The term became widely known in 2016 following its adoption as the theme of the World Economic Forum annual meeting in Davos.

The concept gained strength following the opening of the Center for the Fourth Industrial Revolution in 2016 in San Francisco. NDE 4.0 evolved in conjunction with Industry 4.0. It is recognized as a future goal by several global NDE organizations: the International Committee for Nondestructive Testing (ICNDT) has a Specialist international Group (SIG) on NDE 4.0, and the European Federation for Nondestructive Testing (EFNDT) created a working group designated as "EFNDT Working Group 10: NDE 4.0" (WG10). The importance of NDE 4.0 is reflected in the activities of NDE organizations throughout the world, including the American Society of Nondestructive Testing (ASNT), the British Institute of Non-Destructive Testing (BINDT), and the German Society for Non-Destructive Testing (DGZfP), through publications and training.

== History ==
Visualization of the four industrial and NDE revolutions. For the definition of the four NDE revolutions it was chosen to define them independent from Industry by the revolutionary changes within NDE.

Leading to NDE 4.0, just as those leading to Industry 4.0 were prior developments that are divided into prior revolutions based on distinct technological and historical markers. These are usually defined for industry and hence for nondestructive evaluation.

=== NDE 1.0 ===
The first revolution in nondestructive evaluation coincides with the first industrial revolution and refers to the period between approximately 1770 (following the invention of the Watt’s steam engine in 1769) and 1870. The transition from hand and artisanal production and “muscle power” to mechanized production and steam- and hydro-power necessitated the introduction of nondestructive testing. Prior to this period, people have tested objects for thousands of years through simple methods based human sensory perception – feeling, smelling listening and observing as appropriate.

The development in the first industrial revolution gave birth to non-destructive inspection through the introduction of tools that sharpened the human senses, and through tentative attempts at standardized procedures. Simple tools such as lenses, stethoscopes, tap and listen procedures and others, improved detection capabilities by enhancing human senses. Establishing procedures, made the outcome of the inspection comparable over time. At the same time, industrialization also made it necessary to expand quality assurance measures, a process that continues to this day.

=== NDE 2.0 ===
The second revolution in NDE is commonly referred to as the period between 1870, with the appearance of first means of mass production, marked by the introduction of the conveyor belt, and 1969. As with the second revolution in industry, it is characterized by use of physical, chemical, mechanical and electrical knowledge to improve testing and evaluation.

The transformation of electromagnetic and acoustic waves, which lie outside the range of human perception, into signals that can be interpreted by humans, resulted in means of interrogating components for better visualization of material inhomogeneities at or close to the surface. Following the discovery of X-rays in 1895, it became a dominant method for testing, followed by gamma-ray testing and later, electromagnetic means of testing.

With the introduction of the transistor into electronics, testing methods such as ultrasound developed further into lighter, portable systems suitable for field testing. The first detectors for infrared and terahertz detection were invented around the same time and the first eddy current devices became available. Although these are critical methods of testing that persist to this day, further breakthroughs had to wait until digitization and digital electronics developed in the third NDE revolution.

=== NDE 3.0 ===
The third revolution in NDE parallels the advent of microelectronics, digital technologies and computers. It is usually thought of as the period starting in 1969, marked by the introduction of the first programmable logic controller (PLC), and 2016. Digital inspection equipment, such as X-ray detectors, digital ultrasonic and eddy current equipment, and digital cameras became integral parts of the system of testing and evaluation. Robotics lead to automated processes, improving convenience, safety, speed and repeatability.

Digital technologies offered leaps in managing inspection data acquisition, storage, processing, 2D and 3D imaging, interpretation, and communication. Data processing and sharing became the norm. At the same time, these developments created new challenges and opportunities such as data security and integrity and introduced new concepts such as value of data and its monetization.

=== NDE 4.0 ===
Whereas prior revolutions focused on improving testing and evaluation by taking advantage of the tools, methods and development available at the respective periods, the 4th NDE revolution is characterized by integration; integration of tools, testing methods, digital technologies, and communication into coherent closed-loop systems that allows both feedback and feed-forward to manufacturing. The purpose is improvement in testing and evaluation taking advantage of current and emerging production technologies and communication and information systems.

At the heart of NDE 4.0 are digitalization, networking, information transparency, communication and processing tools such as artificial intelligence and machine learning. One of the primary added values in NDE 4.0 is the possibility of product design and concurrent nondestructive evaluation through use of digital twins and digital threads, so that both design and testing can influence each other continuously. Another is the ability to serve emerging trends such as testing in custom manufacturing, remote testing and predictive maintenance over the lifetime of products.

NDE 4.0 is not a fixed set of rules and concepts but rather and evolving progression of ideas, tools and procedures brought about by advances in production, communication and processing. Its global purpose is to serve the needs of industry and respond to changes brought about by emergence of new opportunities.

== Drivers and components ==
NDE 4.0 utilizes modern technology along with the nondestructive testing process to match the characteristics of Industry 4.0. This structure can be generally grouped under three main areas: utilization of advanced technology for the improvement of inspection techniques (“Industry 4.0 for NDE”), analysis of inspection data for the development of products (“NDE for Industry 4.0”) and human factor integration via remote operations, data processing, and simulation training.

== International Conference on NDE 4.0 ==
The International Conference on NDE 4.0, organized every two years by the ICNDT SIG, resumed in 2025 in Bengaluru after pandemic delays.

1. 14/15 & 20/21 April 2021: Virtual Conference with 4 keynotes, 26 invited presentations and four panel discussions organized (video recordings available online) by DGZfP and co-sponsored by ICNDT
2. 24 – 27 October 2022 in Berlin, Germany with 4 keynotes and 15 technical sessions (including Artificial intelligence, Digital twin, Additive Manufacturing, Extended Reality, Reliability, and Predictive Maintenance). This conference was organized by DGZfP and co-sponsored by ICNDT. At this conference the Kurzweil Award for High Impact in NDE 4.0 (named after Ray Kurzweil) was initiated and awarded to Prof. Dr. Norbert Meyendorf and Prof. Dr. Bernd Valeske for their work "Starting the Field of NDE 4.0".
3. 3–6 March 2025 in Taj Yeshwantpur, India. This conference is organized by the Indian Society for Non-destructive Testing (ISNT) and co-sponsored by ICNDT.
