= Intelligent maintenance system =

System that uses collected data from machinery

An intelligent maintenance system (IMS) is a system that uses collected data from machinery in order to predict and prevent potential failures in them. The occurrence of failures in machinery can be costly and even catastrophic. In order to avoid failures, there needs to be a system which analyzes the behavior of the machine and provides alarms and instructions for preventive maintenance. Analyzing the behavior of the machines has become possible by means of advanced sensors, data collection systems, data storage/transfer capabilities and data analysis tools. These are the same set of tools developed for prognostics. The aggregation of data collection, storage, transformation, analysis and decision making for smart maintenance is called an intelligent maintenance system (IMS).

== Definition ==
An intelligent maintenance system is a system that uses data analysis and decision support tools to predict and prevent the potential failure of machines. The recent advancement in information technology, computers, and electronics have facilitated the design and implementation of such systems.

The key research elements of intelligent maintenance systems consist of:

1. Transformation of data to information to knowledge and synchronization of the decisions with remote systems
2. Intelligent, embedded prognostic algorithms for assessing degradation and predicting the performance in future
3. Software and hardware platforms to run online models
4. Embedded product services and life cycle information for closed-loop product designs

== E-manufacturing and e-maintenance ==
With evolving applications of tether-free communication technologies (e.g. Internet) e-intelligence is having a larger impact on industries. Such impact has become a driving force for companies to shift the manufacturing operations from traditional factory integration practices towards an e-factory and e-supply chain philosophy. Such change is transforming the companies from local factory automation to global business automation. The goal of e-manufacturing is, from the plant floor assets, to predict the deviation of the quality of the products and possible loss of any equipment. This brings about the predictive maintenance capability of the machines.

The major functions and objectives of e-manufacturing are: “(a) provide a transparent, seamless and automated information exchange process to enable an only handle information once (OHIO) environment; (b) improve the use of plant floor assets using a holistic approach combining the tools of predictive maintenance techniques; (c) link entire supply chain management (SCM) operation and asset optimization; and (d) deliver customer services using the latest predictive intelligence methods and tether-free technologies”.

The e-Maintenance infrastructure consists of several information sectors:

- Control systems and production schedulers
- Engineering product data management systems
- Enterprise resource planning (ERP) systems
- Condition monitoring systems
- Maintenance scheduling (CMMS/EAM) systems
- Plant asset management (PAM) systems

== See also ==
- Big Data
- Cyber manufacturing
- Cyber-physical system
- Decision support systems
- Industrial artificial intelligence
- Industrial Big Data
- Industry 4.0
- Internet of Things
- Intelligent transformation
- Machine to machine
- Maintenance, repair, and operations
- Predictive maintenance
- Preventive maintenance
- Prognostics
- Smart, connected products
