= Work 4.0 =

Term related to the transformation of work and technology

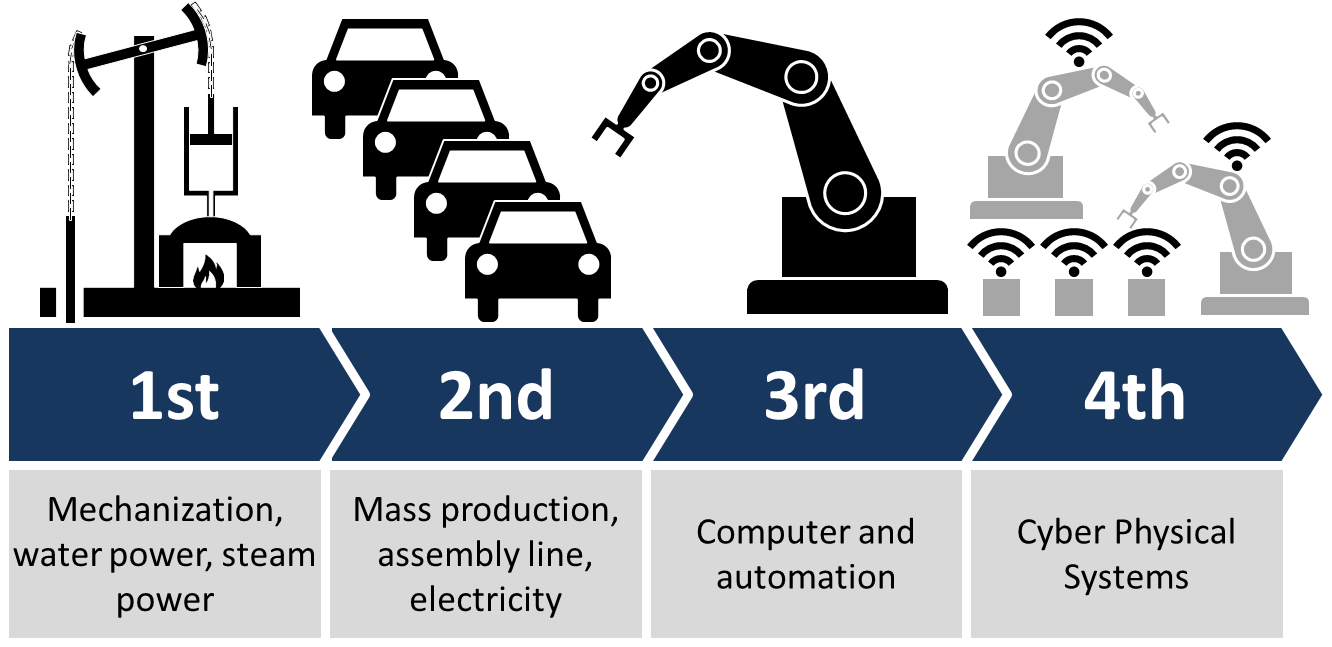
The four main stages of the "Industrial Revolution" that began in the 18th century

Work 4.0 (German: Arbeit 4.0) is the conceptual umbrella under which the future of work is discussed in Germany and, to some extent, within the European Union. It describes how the world of work may change until 2030 and beyond in response to the developments associated with Industry 4.0, including widespread digitalization. The concept was first introduced in November 2015 by the German Federal Ministry of Labour and Social Affairs (BMAS) when it launched a report entitled Re-Imagining Work: Green Paper Work 4.0. It has since then been taken up by trade unions such as the DGB and various employers' and industry association such as the VDMA and the BDA. At the global level, similar topics are addressed by the World Bank's 2019 World Development Report The Changing Nature of Work and ILO's Future of Work Centenary Initiative.

== Conceptual framework ==
Conceptually, Work 4.0 reflects the current fourth phase of work relations, having been preceded by the birth of industrial society and the first workers' organizations in the late 18th century (Work 1.0), the beginning of mass production and of the welfare state in the late 19th century (Work 2.0), and the advent of globalization, digitalization and the transformation of the social market economy since the 1970s (Work 3.0). By contrast, Work 4.0 is characterized by a high degree of integration and cooperation, the use of digital technologies (e.g. the internet), and a rise in flexible work arrangements. Its drivers include digitalization, globalization, demographic change (ageing, migration), and cultural change. Challenges include

- (i) the transformation of economic sectors and activities and its effect on employment,
- (ii) the creation of new markets and new forms of work through digital platforms,
- (iii) the issues associated with Big Data (e.g. data protection),
- (iv) the relationship between the use of human and machine labor (upskilling vs. deskilling, devaluation of experience, individual support vs. behavioral monitoring),
- (v) the possibility of flexible work conditions regarding time and location, and
- (vi) profound changes in the structures of organizations.

In response to these challenges, the BMAS has developed a "vision for quality jobs in the digital age", based on policies such as moving from unemployment to employment insurance, the promotion of self-determined flexible working time arrangements, improvements in the working conditions of the service sector, new ergonomic approaches to occupational health and safety, high standards in employee data protection, the co-determination and participation of social partners in employment relations, better social protection for self-employed persons, and the beginning of a European dialogue on the future of the welfare state.

The Fourth Industrial Revolution, 4IR or Industry 4.0 marks a rapid change to how technology influences industry, society, processes and operations in the 21st century. The term has become increasingly common in literature, media and scientific documentation and has continued to evolve since its inception in 2015.

Under the Industry 4.0 umbrella is Work 4.0, a term coined by Germany and used within the European Union to describe significant changes to the world of work until 2030. This concept was also introduced in 2015 and has subsequently been adopted by trade unions, discussed by the World Bank, and become part of a global technology shift in mindset and approach.

Both Industry 4.0 and Work 4.0 are powered by transformation and digitalization and the evolution of technology and its inherent connectivity and capability have given rise to other applications and approaches. One such approach is Safety 4.0. this is a fundamental shift in the safety management and technologies designed to create a standardized framework that focuses on new practices and processes that shift safety engagements between workers and machinery.

Safety 4.0 offers a new level of Industry 4.0 by ensuring that people sit at the center of engagements across plants, machinery and systems. It allows for increases in productivity, worker efficiency and connectivity while allowing for the secure automation of safety protocols, technologies and systems.

== World Bank analysis ==
The World Development Report 2019 argues that a new social contract is needed to address longer work transitions. Authors Simeon Djankov and Federica Saliola documents examples of countries and companies that have created new ways to deliver social insurance.

== World Economic Forum debate ==
Work 4.0 has also emerged as a core topic of discussion for the WEF during its annual meetings in Davos. Referring to this phenomenon as the Fourth Industrial Revolution, it integrates concepts from Synthetic biology, Artificial intelligence, and Additive Manufacturing. However, some speculate that this push to automate is less a technological edict and more a hidden agenda by corporations to replace laborers with Industrial automation.
