= LiveTiles =

Technology company

- Website type: Public
- Traded as: ASX: LVT
- Founded: 2014
- Headquarters: Melbourne, Australia
- Founders: Karl Redenbach; Peter Nguyen-Brown
- CEO: David Vander
- Industry: Software
- Website: www.livetilesglobal.com

LiveTiles is an intranet and digital workplace software company founded in 2014. The company develops cloud-based digital workplace software for the commercial, government and education markets.

Since December 2023, LiveTiles has been managed by receivers KordaMentha.

The company is headquartered in Melbourne, and has offices in Sligo, Vejle, Porto, and Sydney.

== History ==
LiveTiles was founded in Australia by Karl Redenbach and Peter Nguyen-Brown, following the sale of their IT consultancy nSynergy to Rhipe in 2014. In 2015 it became listed on the Australian Securities Exchange after its reverse acquisition of coal company Modun Resources Limited, with an initial IPO of A$57 million.

In 2017, the company raised A$12 million in equity financing through a share purchase plan.

In May 2018, LiveTiles acquired US based Microsoft AI firm Hyperfish for A$8.9 million.

In February 2019, LiveTiles acquired Danish digital workplace software company Wizdom for a maximum total purchase price of EUR 30 million (approximately A$47.6 million).

In November 2019, LiveTiles acquired Swiss intranet provider CYCL AG in a deal worth A$19 million, which was made up of A$6.3 million in cash and A$12.6 million in shares.

In December 2021, LiveTiles acquired My Net Zero, climate solution application.

In October 2023, LiveTiles announced the departure of CEO David Vander as part of a restructure and cost reduction program with the aim of achieving cashflow breakeven. David Vander remains the CEO despite his previous resignation.

In December 2023, LiveTiles entered receivership and was suspended from trading on the ASX.

== Corporate affairs ==
=== Leadership ===
LiveTiles is managed by CEO David Vander.

=== Products / business model ===
The company develops and sells cloud-based digital workplace and intranet's for Office 365, Azure, and SharePoint. This includes various solutions including LiveTiles Mosaic, which was developed for K-12 educational institutions and has 1.2 million users, and LiveTiles Commercial. They also provide LiveTiles Reach, a mobile app; digital workplace and intranet design tools called LiveTiles Intranet and LiveTiles Everywhere; artificial intelligence, employee wellness and communication platform LiveTiles Quantum.

In 2017, LiveTiles partnered with Microsoft to launch the joint venture AI Australia, an Australian-based artificial intelligence development firm.

== Awards ==
LiveTiles has won business and technology awards for its AI and IT work. In 2018 the company was presented with Microsoft's "US Modern Workplace Transformation Partner of the Year" award, recognizing its advancements in workplace integration of AI. Also in 2018, LiveTiles won “Best Application of AI in the Enterprise” at the AIconics AI Summit.
