= Distributed manufacturing =

Coordinated decentralized manufacturing

Distributed manufacturing, also known as distributed production, cloud producing, distributed digital manufacturing, and local manufacturing, is a form of decentralized manufacturing practiced by enterprises using a network of geographically dispersed manufacturing facilities that are coordinated using information technology. It can also refer to local manufacture via the historic cottage industry model, or manufacturing that takes place in the homes of consumers.

== Enterprise ==
In enterprise environments, the primary attribute of distributed manufacturing is the ability to create value at geographically dispersed locations. For example, shipping costs could be minimized when products are built geographically close to their intended markets. Also, products manufactured in a number of small facilities distributed over a wide area can be customized with details adapted to individual or regional tastes. Manufacturing components in different physical locations and then managing the supply chain to bring them together for final assembly of a product is also considered a form of distributed manufacturing. Digital networks combined with additive manufacturing allow companies decentralized and geographically independent distributed production (cloud manufacturing).

== Consumer ==
Within the maker movement and DIY culture, small scale production by consumers often using peer-to-peer resources is being referred to as distributed manufacturing. Consumers download digital designs from an open design repository website like Youmagine or Thingiverse and produce a product for low costs through a distributed network of 3D printing services such as 3D Hubs, Geomiq. In the most distributed form of distributed manufacturing the consumer becomes a prosumer and manufacturers products at home with an open-source 3D printer such as the RepRap. In 2013 a desktop 3D printer could be economically justified as a personal product fabricator and the number of free and open hardware designs were growing exponentially. Today there are millions of open hardware product designs at hundreds of repositories and there is some evidence consumers are 3D printing to save money. For example, 2017 case studies probed the quality of: (1) six common complex toys; (2) Lego blocks; and (3) the customizability of open source board games and found that all filaments analyzed saved the prosumer over 75% of the cost of commercially available true alternative toys and over 90% for recyclebot filament. Overall, these results indicate a single 3D printing repository, MyMiniFactory, is saving consumers well over $60 million/year in offset purchases of only toys. These 3D printers can now be used to make sophisticated high-value products like scientific instruments. Similarly, a study in 2022 found that 81% of open source designs provided economic savings and the total savings for the 3D printing community is more than $35 million from downloading only the top 100 products at YouMagine. In general, the savings are largest when compared to conventional products when prosumers use recycled materials in 'distributed recycling and additive manufacturing' (DRAM).

== Emergency Distributed Manufacturing During COVID-19 Pandemic ==
Distributed manufacturing became far more visible during the COVID-19 pandemic because it offered a practical response to the breakdown of centralized global supply chains. As lock downs, border restrictions, and factory shutdowns disrupted conventional production, decentralized networks using local facilities such as Open Source Medical Supplies stepped in and manufactured over 48 million products. Additive manufacturing /3D printing were used to produce urgently needed items such as face shields, ventilators and their components, nasopharyngeal swabs, and other personal protective equipment. This demonstrated that distributed manufacturing could reduce lead times, improve responsiveness, and lessen dependence on distant suppliers during crisis conditions for a wide range of products. Peer-reviewed studies on pandemic-era manufacturing note that additive manufacturing was especially valuable because digital design files could be shared rapidly and produced close to the point of need, enabling hospitals, universities, small firms, and maker communities to supplement strained medical supply chains. The pandemic also helped shift distributed manufacturing from being seen as a niche or experimental model to a credible strategy for resilience, flexibility, and emergency response. At the same time, scholars caution that its wider adoption depends on solving issues related to quality assurance, regulation, material consistency, and coordination across distributed production sites. Overall, COVID-19 popularized distributed manufacturing by showing that localized, digitally enabled production could complement traditional manufacturing systems when speed, adaptability, and supply-chain resilience were critical.

== Social change ==
Some call attention to the conjunction of commons-based peer production with distributed manufacturing techniques. The self-reinforced fantasy of a system of eternal growth can be overcome with the development of economies of scope, and here, the civil society can play an important role contributing to the raising of the whole productive structure to a higher plateau of more sustainable and customised productivity. Further, it is true that many issues, problems and threats rise due to the large democratization of the means of production, and especially regarding the physical ones. For instance, the recyclability of advanced nanomaterials is still questioned; weapons manufacturing could become easier; not to mention the implications on counterfeiting and on "intellectual property". It might be maintained that in contrast to the industrial paradigm whose competitive dynamics were about economies of scale, commons-based peer production and distributed manufacturing could develop economies of scope. While the advantages of scale rest on cheap global transportation, the economies of scope share infrastructure costs (intangible and tangible productive resources), taking advantage of the capabilities of the fabrication tools. And following Neil Gershenfeld in that "some of the least developed parts of the world need some of the most advanced technologies", commons-based peer production and distributed manufacturing may offer the necessary tools for thinking globally but act locally in response to certain problems and needs. As well as supporting individual personal manufacturing social and economic benefits are expected to result from the development of local production economies. In particular, the humanitarian and development sector are becoming increasingly interested in how distributed manufacturing can overcome the supply chain challenges of last mile distribution. Further, distributed manufacturing has been proposed as a key element in the Cosmopolitan localism or cosmolocalism framework to reconfigure production by prioritizing socio-ecological well-being over corporate profits, over-production and excess consumption.

== Technology ==
By localizing manufacturing, distributed manufacturing may enable a balance between two opposite extreme qualities in technology development: Low technology and High tech. This balance is understood as an inclusive middle, a "mid-tech", that may go beyond the two polarities, incorporating them into a higher synthesis. Thus, in such an approach, low-tech and high-tech stop being mutually exclusive. They instead become a dialectical totality. Mid-tech may be abbreviated to "both…and…" instead of "neither…nor…". Mid-tech combines the efficiency and versatility of digital/automated technology with low-tech's potential for autonomy and resilience.

== Contracting in Distributed Manufacturing ==
Research into contracting and order processing models tailored for distributed manufacturing has highlighted the need for flexible, role-based frameworks and advanced digital tools. These tools and frameworks are essential for addressing issues related to quality assurance, payment structures, legal compliance, and coordination among multiple actors. By addressing these challenges, contracting models for distributed manufacturing can unlock its potential for more localized, efficient, and sustainable production systems. A system prototype has been developed to simplify contracting for distributed manufacturing. This tool allows buyers to manage orders across multiple manufacturers using a single interface, automating workflows to ensure clarity and accountability for everyone involved. This research was led by the Internet of Production, as part of the mAkE project (African European Maker Innovation Ecosystem), funded by the European Horizon 2020 research and innovation programme.
