= Fourth Industrial Revolution =

Term for 2010s–present technological era

- 21st century – present
Third Industrial Revolution
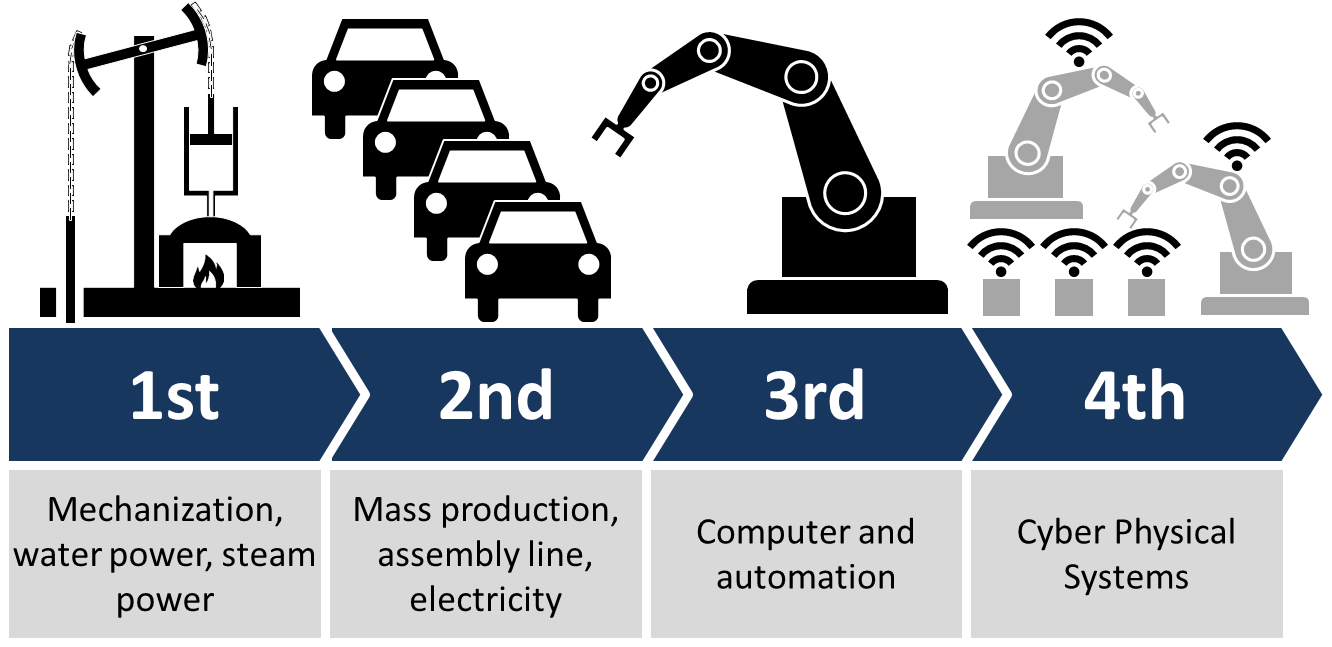
- Location: Worldwide
- Key events: Mainstreaming of IoT and smart devices; Rapid scaling of AI and LLMs; Evolution of Quantum computing; Widespread commercial automation and robotics; Integration of Biotechnology and genetic engineering; Alternate name: Industry 4.0 Core Catalyst: Blurring boundaries between physical, digital, and biological spheres through hyper-connectivity and AI.

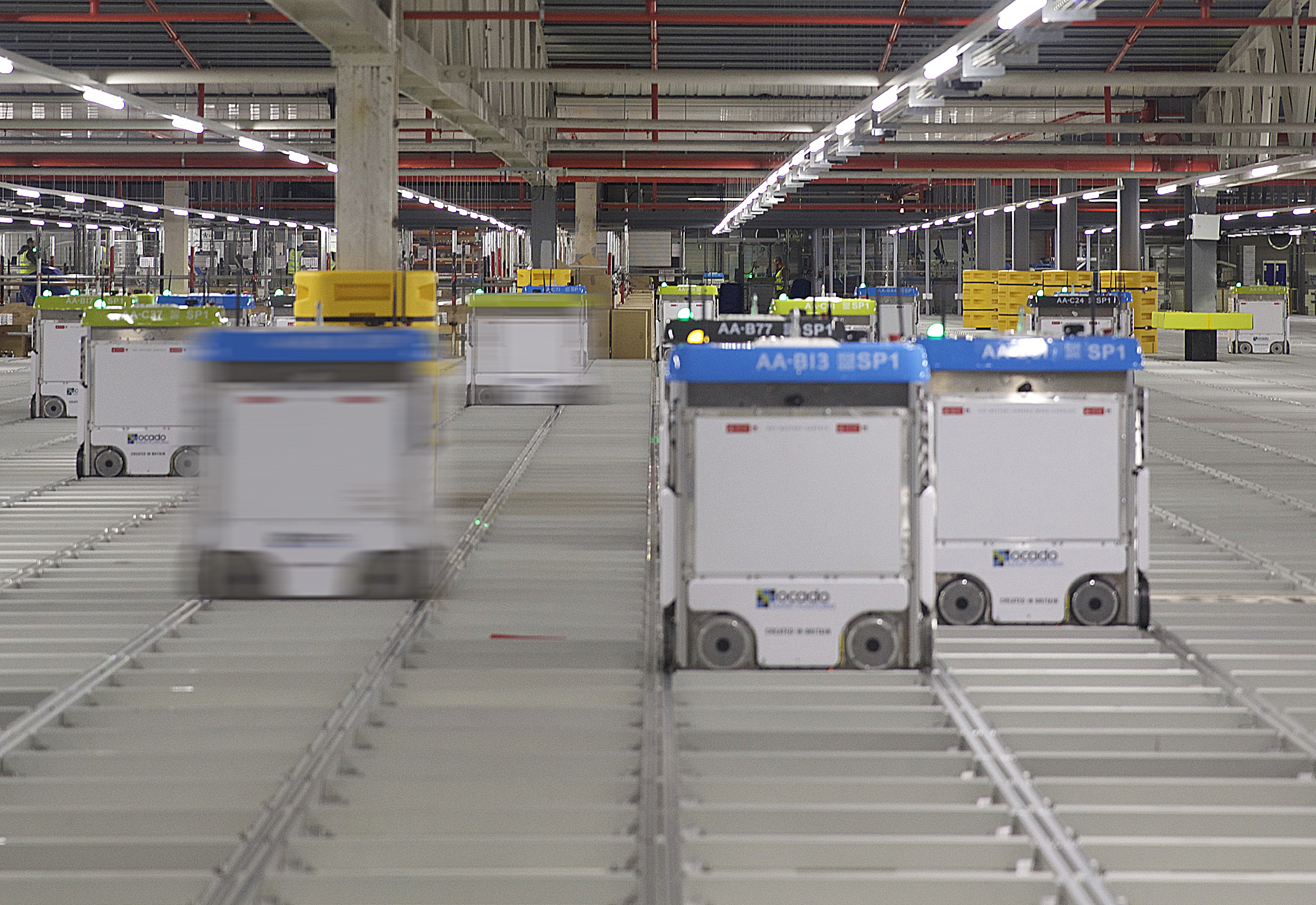
Robots in a grocery warehouse

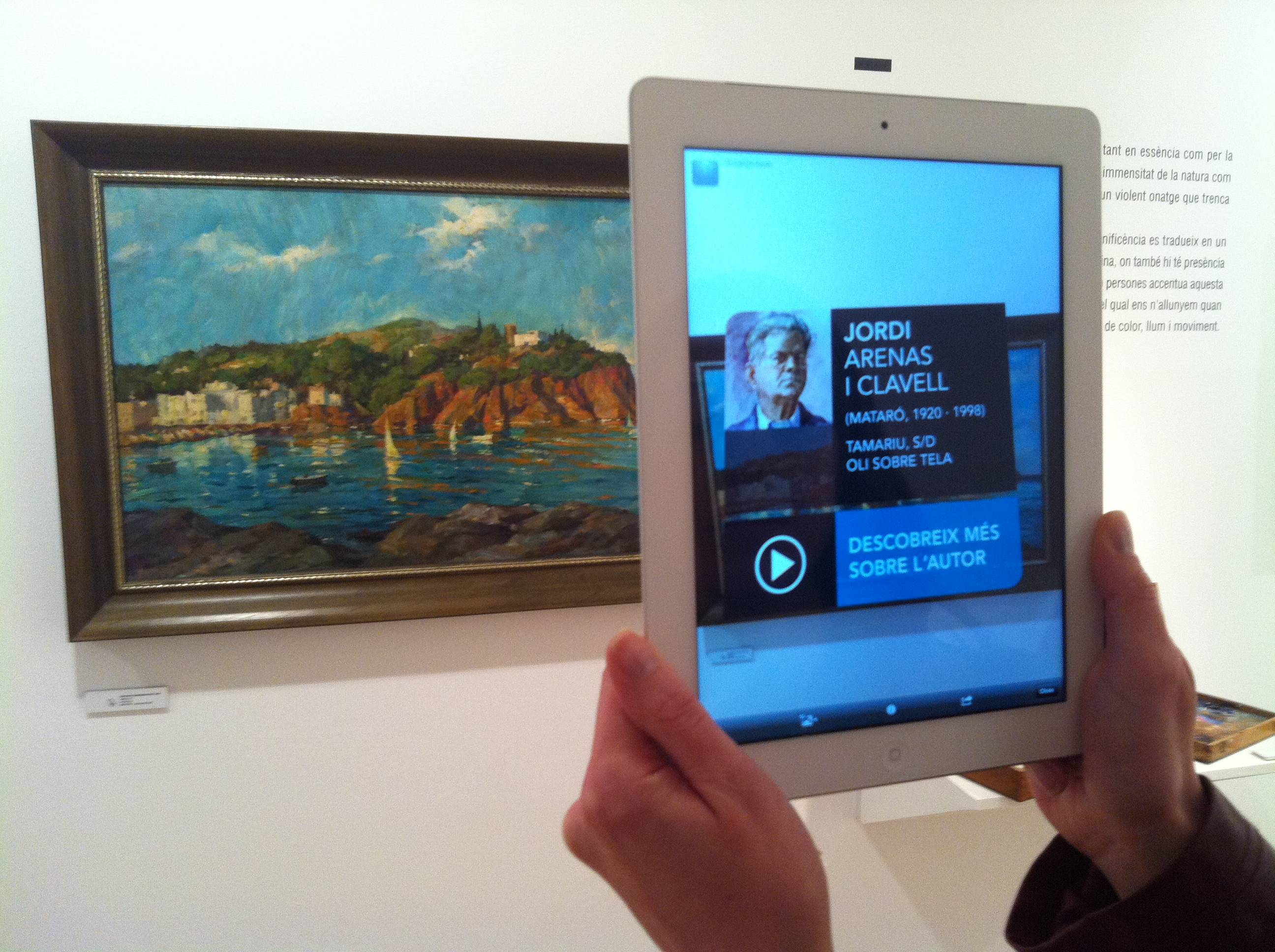
Augmented reality information about a painting

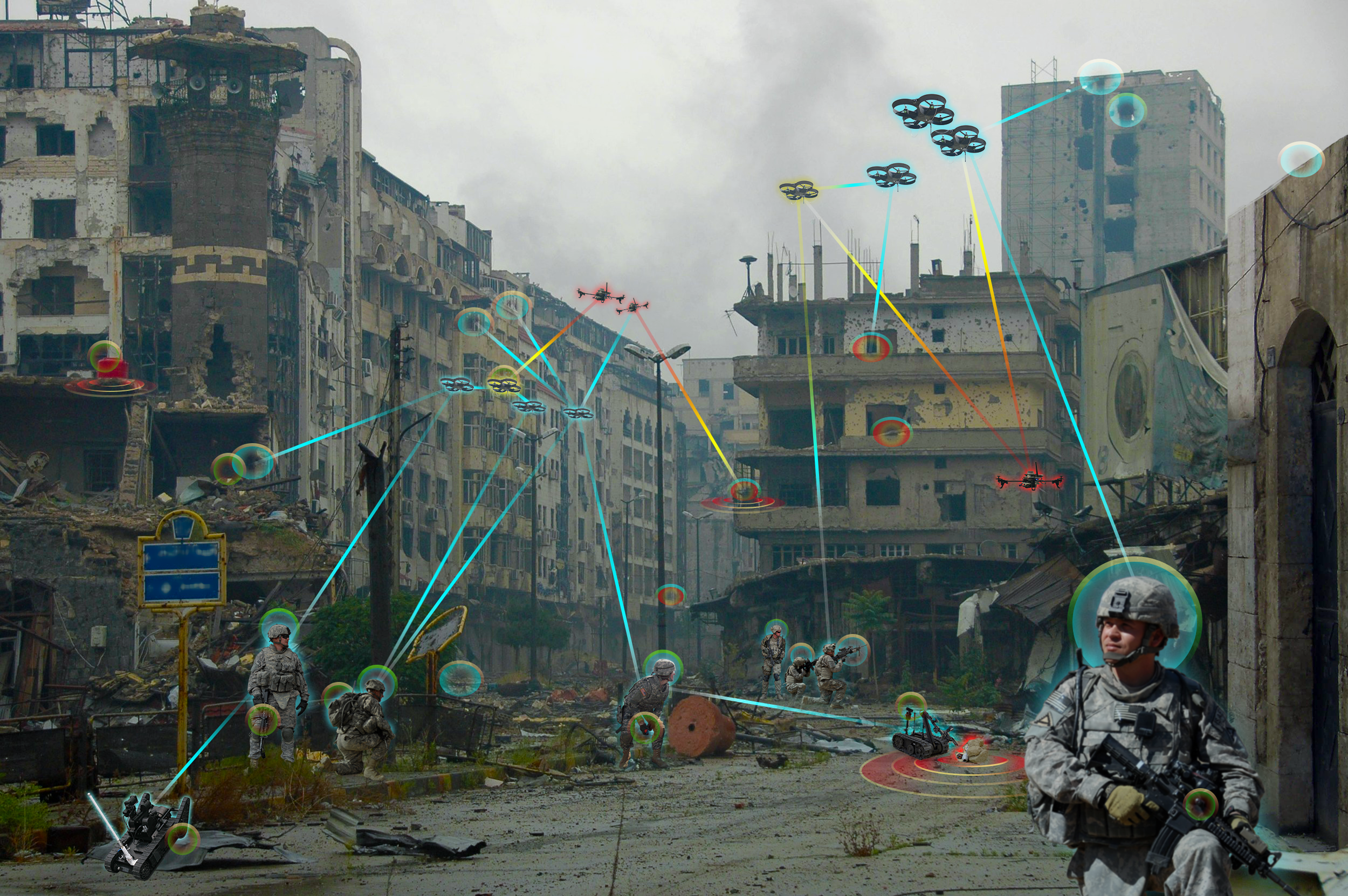
Illustrated understanding of the Internet of things in a battlefield setting

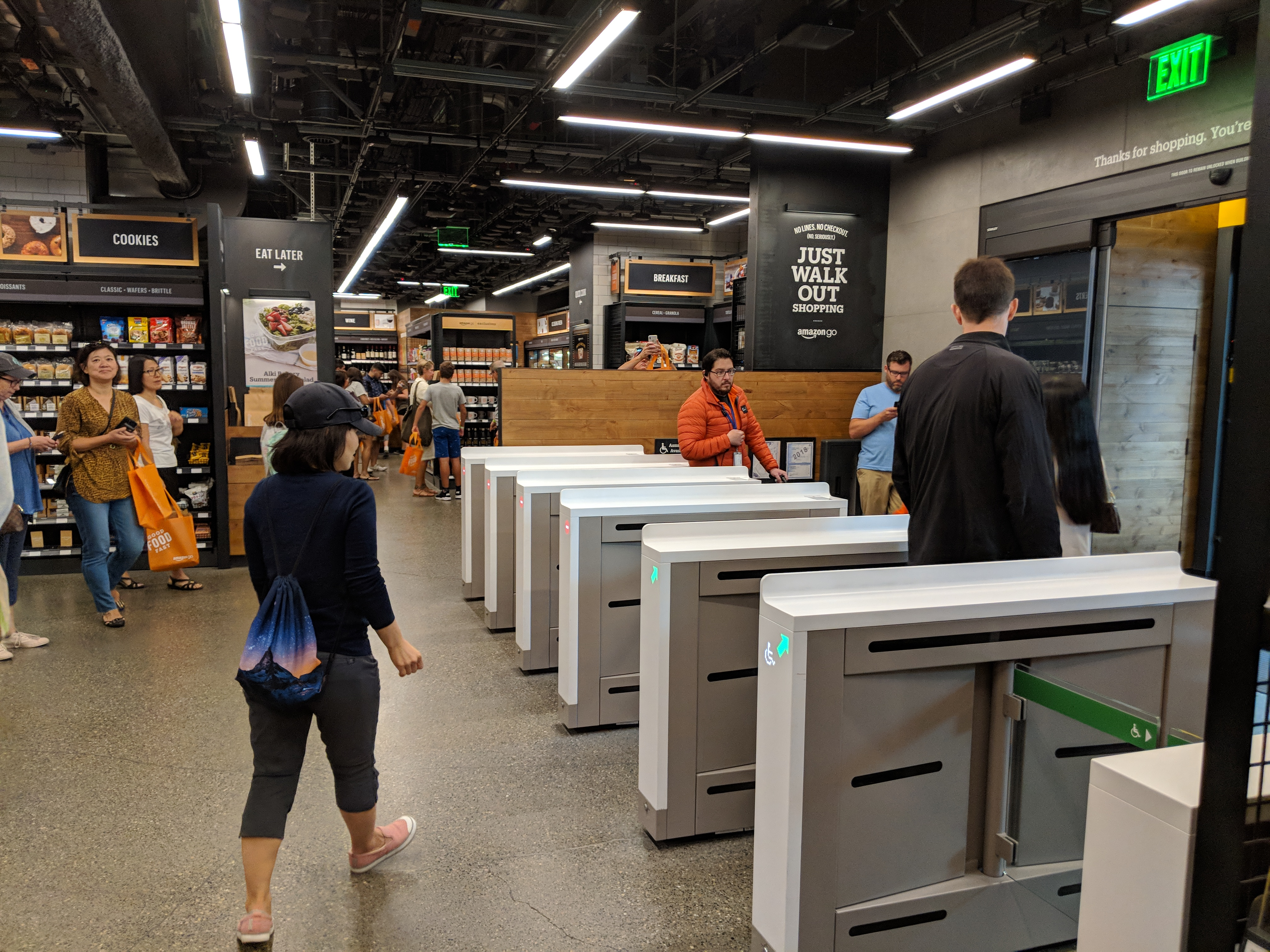
Amazon Go, a cashierless store

The Fourth Industrial Revolution, also known as 4IR, Industry 4.0 or the Intelligence Age, is a neologism describing rapid technological advancement in the 21st century. It follows the Third Industrial Revolution (the "Information Age"). The term was popularized in 2016 by Klaus Schwab, the World Economic Forum founder and former executive chairman, who asserts that these developments represent a significant shift in industrial capitalism.

A part of this phase of industrial change is the joining of technologies like artificial intelligence, gene editing, to advanced robotics that blur the lines between the physical, digital, and biological worlds.

Throughout this, fundamental shifts are taking place in how the global production and supply network operates through ongoing automation of traditional manufacturing and industrial practices, using modern smart technology, large-scale machine-to-machine communication (M2M), and the Internet of things (IoT). This integration results in increasing automation, improving communication and self-monitoring, and the use of smart machines that can analyse and diagnose issues without the need for human intervention.

It also represents a social, political, and economic shift from the digital age of the late 1990s and early 2000s to an era of embedded connectivity distinguished by the ubiquity of technology in society that changes the ways humans experience and know the world around them. It posits that we have created and are entering an augmented social reality compared to just the natural senses and industrial ability of humans alone. The Fourth Industrial Revolution is sometimes expected to mark the beginning of an imagination age, where creativity and imagination become the primary drivers of economic value.

== History ==
The phrase Fourth Industrial Revolution was first introduced by a team of scientists developing a high-tech strategy for the German government. Klaus Schwab, former executive chairman of the World Economic Forum (WEF), introduced the phrase to a wider audience in a 2015 article published by Foreign Affairs. "Mastering the Fourth Industrial Revolution" was the 2016 theme of the World Economic Forum Annual Meeting, in Davos-Klosters, Switzerland.

On 10 October 2016, the Forum announced the opening of its Centre for the Fourth Industrial Revolution in San Francisco. This was also subject and title of Schwab's 2016 book. Schwab includes in this fourth era technologies that combine hardware, software, and biology (cyber-physical systems), and emphasizes advances in communication and connectivity. Schwab expects this era to be marked by breakthroughs in emerging technologies in fields such as robotics, artificial intelligence, nanotechnology, quantum computing, biotechnology, the internet of things, the industrial internet of things, decentralized consensus, fifth-generation wireless technologies, 3D printing, and fully autonomous vehicles.

In The Great Reset proposal by the WEF, The Fourth Industrial Revolution is included as a strategic intelligence in the solution to rebuild the economy sustainably following the COVID-19 pandemic.

=== First Industrial Revolution ===
The First Industrial Revolution was marked by a transition from hand production methods to machines through the use of steam power and water power. The implementation of new technologies took a long time, so the period which this refers to was between 1760 and 1820, or 1840 in Europe and the United States. Its effects had consequences on textile manufacturing, which was first to adopt such changes, as well as iron industry, agriculture, and mining–although it also had societal effects with an ever stronger middle class.

=== Second Industrial Revolution ===
The Second Industrial Revolution, also known as the Technological Revolution, is the period between 1871 and 1914 that resulted from installations of extensive railroad and telegraph networks, which allowed for faster transfer of people and ideas, as well as electricity. Increasing electrification allowed for factories to develop the modern production line.

=== Third Industrial Revolution ===
The Third Industrial Revolution, also known as the Digital Revolution, began in the late 20th century. It is characterized by the shift to an economy centered on information technology, marked by the advent of personal computers, the Internet, and the widespread digitalization of communication and industrial processes.

A book by Jeremy Rifkin titled The Third Industrial Revolution, published in 2011, focused on the intersection of digital communications technology and renewable energy. It was made into a 2017 documentary by Vice Media.

== Characteristics ==
In essence, the Fourth Industrial Revolution is the trend towards automation and data exchange in manufacturing technologies and processes which include cyber-physical systems (CPS), internet of things (IoT), cloud computing, cognitive computing, and artificial intelligence.

Machines improve human efficiency in performing repetitive functions, and the combination of machine learning and computing power allows machines to carry out increasingly complex tasks.

The Fourth Industrial Revolution has been defined as technological developments in cyber-physical systems such as high capacity connectivity; new human-machine interaction modes such as touch interfaces and virtual reality systems; and improvements in transferring digital instructions to the physical world including robotics and 3D printing (additive manufacturing); "big data" and cloud computing; improvements to and uptake of off-grid: solar, wind, wave, hydroelectric and the electric batteries (lithium-ion renewable energy storage systems and EV).

It also emphasizes decentralized decisions – the ability of cyber physical systems to make decisions on their own and to perform their tasks as autonomously as possible. Only in the case of exceptions, interference, or conflicting goals, are tasks delegated to a higher level.

=== Distinctiveness ===
Proponents of the Fourth Industrial Revolution suggest it is a distinct revolution rather than simply a prolongation of the Third Industrial Revolution. This is due to the following characteristics:

- Velocity – exponential speed at which incumbent industries are affected and displaced
- Scope and systems impact – the large amount of sectors and firms that are affected
- Paradigm shift in technology policy – new policies designed for this new way of doing are present. An example is Singapore's formal recognition of Industry 4.0 in its innovation policies.

Critics of the concept dismiss Industry 4.0 as a marketing strategy. They suggest that although revolutionary changes are identifiable in distinct sectors, there is no systemic change so far. In addition, the pace of recognition of Industry 4.0 and policy transition varies across countries; the definition of Industry 4.0 is not harmonised. One of the most known figures is Jeremy Rifkin who "agree[s] that digitalization is the hallmark and defining technology in what has become known as the Third Industrial Revolution". However, he argues "that the evolution of digitalization has barely begun to run its course and that its new configuration in the form of the Internet of Things represents the next stage of its development".

=== Components ===
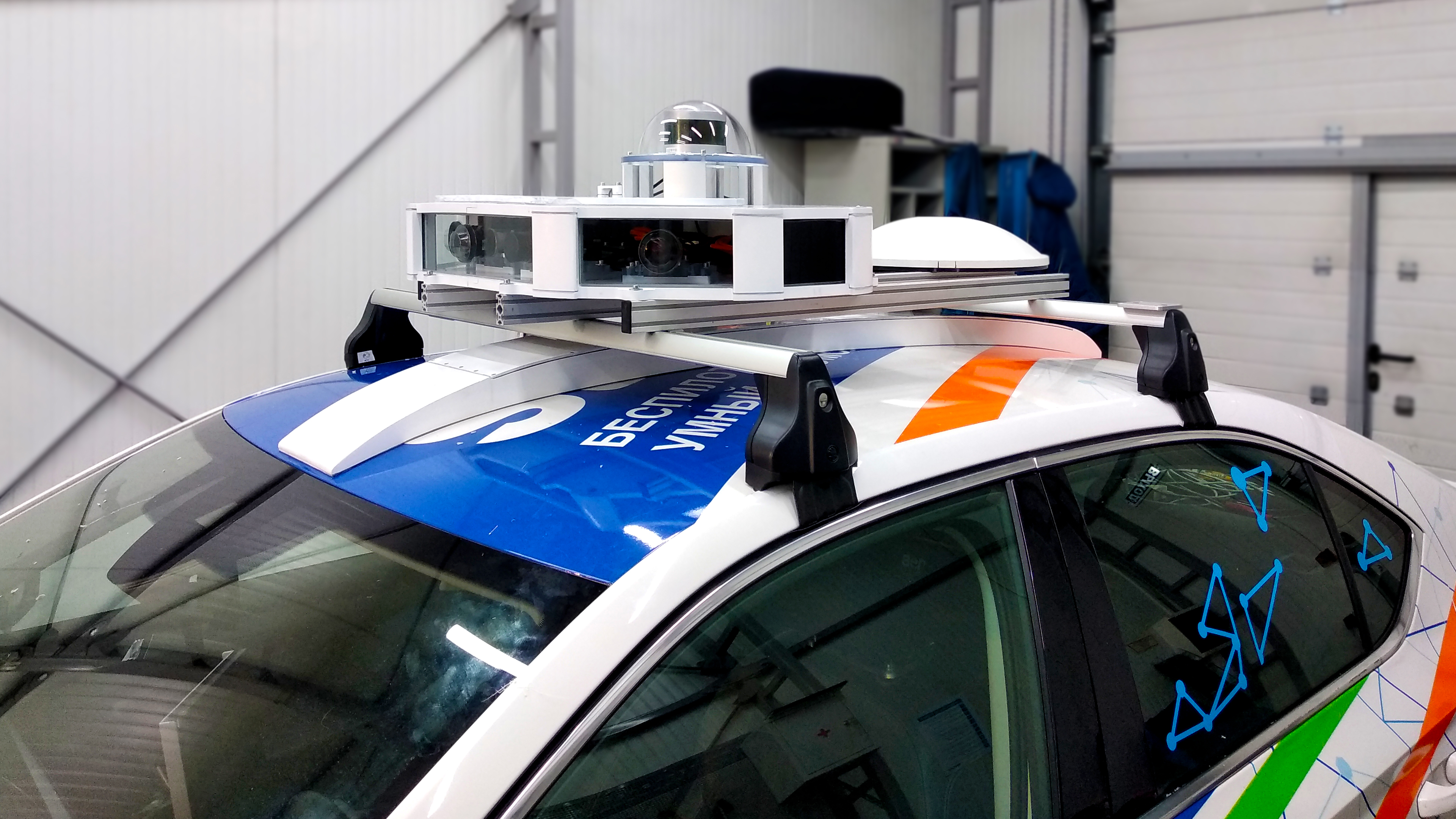
Self-driving car

The application of the Fourth Industrial Revolution operates through:

- Mobile devices
- Location detection technologies (electronic identification)
- Advanced human-machine interfaces
- Authentication and fraud detection
- Smart sensors
- Big analytics and advanced processes
- Multilevel customer interaction and customer profiling
- Augmented reality/wearables
- On-demand availability of computer system resources
- Data visualisation

Industry 4.0 networks a wide range of new technologies to create value. Using cyber-physical systems that monitor physical processes, a virtual copy of the physical world can be designed. Characteristics of cyber-physical systems include the ability to make decentralised decisions independently, reaching a high degree of autonomy.

The value created in Industry 4.0 can be relied upon in electronic identification, in which the smart manufacturing requires set technologies to be incorporated in the manufacturing process to thus be classified as in the development path of Industry 4.0 and no longer digitisation.

== Trends ==
=== Smart factories ===
The Fourth Industrial Revolution fosters "smart factories", which are production environments where facilities and logistics systems are organised with minimal human intervention.

Smart factories are based on cyber-physical systems that communicate with each other through the Internet of Things. In the Industry 4.0 model, these systems monitor physical processes, create a virtual copy of the physical world, and make decentralised decisions. They are intended to cooperate in real time with each other and with humans, both within an organisation and across the services used by participants of the value chain.

=== Artificial intelligence ===
Artificial intelligence (AI) has a wide range of applications across all sectors of the economy. It gained prominence following advancements in deep learning during the 2010s, and its impact intensified in the 2020s with the rise of generative AI, a period often referred to as the "AI boom". Models like GPT-4o can engage in verbal and textual discussions and analyse images.

AI is a key driver of Industry 4.0, orchestrating technologies like robotics, automated vehicles, and real-time data analytics. By enabling machines to perform complex tasks, AI is redefining production processes and reducing changeover times. AI could also significantly accelerate, or even automate software development.

Some experts believe that AI alone could be as transformative as an industrial revolution. Multiple companies such as OpenAI and Meta have expressed the goal of creating artificial general intelligence (AI that can do virtually any cognitive task a human can), making large investments in data centres and GPUs to train more capable AI models.

==== Robotics ====
Humanoid robots have traditionally lacked usefulness. They had difficulty picking simple objects due to imprecise control and coordination, and they wouldn't understand their environment and how physics works. They were often explicitly programmed to do narrow tasks, failing when encountering new situations. Modern humanoid robots, however, are typically based on machine learning, and in particular reinforcement learning. In 2024, humanoid robots are rapidly becoming more flexible, easier to train, and versatile.

=== Predictive maintenance ===
Industry 4.0 facilitates predictive maintenance, due to the use of advanced technologies, including IoT sensors. Predictive maintenance, which can identify potential maintenance issues in real time, allows machine owners to perform cost-effective maintenance before the machinery fails or gets damaged. For example, a company in Los Angeles could understand if a piece of equipment in Singapore is running at an abnormal speed or temperature. They could then decide whether or not it needs to be repaired.

=== 3D printing ===
The Fourth Industrial Revolution is said to have extensive dependency on 3D printing technology. Some advantages of 3D printing for industry are that 3D printing can print many geometric structures, as well as simplify the product design process. It is also relatively environmentally friendly. In low-volume production, it can also decrease lead times and total production costs. Moreover, it can increase flexibility, reduce warehousing costs and help the company towards the adoption of a mass customisation business strategy. In addition, 3D printing can be very useful for printing spare parts and installing it locally, therefore reducing supplier dependence and reducing the supply lead time.

=== Smart sensors ===
Sensors drive the central forces of innovation, not only for Industry 4.0 but also for other "smart" utilities, such as smart production, smart mobility, smart homes, smart cities, and smart factories.

Smart sensors are devices which generate the data and allow further functionality from self-monitoring and self-configuration to condition monitoring of complex processes. With the capability of wireless communication, they reduce installation effort to a great extent and help realise a dense array of sensors.

The importance of sensors, measurement science, and smart evaluation for Industry 4.0 has been recognised and acknowledged by various experts and has already led to the statement "Industry 4.0: nothing goes without sensor systems."

However, there are a few issues, such as time synchronisation error, data loss, and dealing with large amounts of harvested data, which all limit the implementation of full-fledged systems. Moreover, additional limits on these functionalities represent the battery power. One example of the integration of smart sensors in the electronic devices, is the case of smart watches, where sensors receive the data from the movement of the user, process the data and as a result, provide the user with the information about how many steps they have walked in a day and also converts the data into calories burned.

==== Agriculture and food industries ====
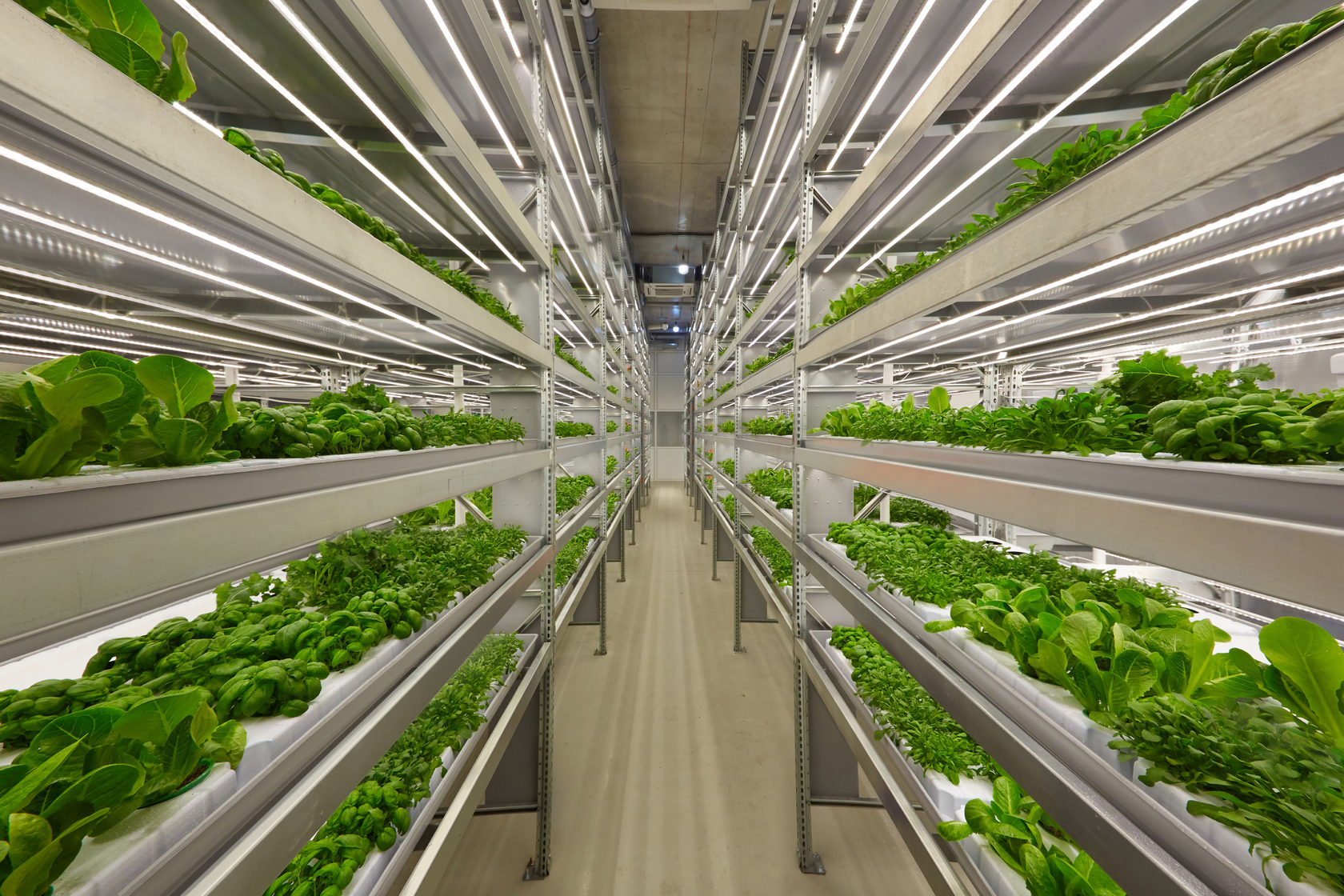
Hydroponic vertical farming

Smart sensors in these two fields are still in the testing stage. These connected sensors collect, interpret and communicate the information available in the plots (leaf area, vegetation index, chlorophyll, hygrometry, temperature, water potential, radiation). Based on this scientific data, the objective is to enable real-time monitoring via a smartphone with a range of advice that optimises plot management in terms of results, time and costs. On the farm, these sensors can be used to detect crop stages and recommend inputs and treatments at the right time, as well as controlling the level of irrigation.

The food industry requires more and more security and transparency and full documentation is required. This new technology is used as a tracking system as well as the collection of human data and product data.

=== Accelerated transition to the knowledge economy ===
Knowledge economy is an economic system in which production and services are largely based on knowledge-intensive activities that contribute to an accelerated pace of technical and scientific advance, as well as rapid obsolescence. Industry 4.0 aids transitions into knowledge economy by increasing reliance on intellectual capabilities rather than on physical inputs or natural resources.

== Challenges ==
Challenges in implementation of Industry 4.0:

=== Economic ===
- High economic cost
- Business model adaptation
- Unclear economic benefits/excessive investment
- Driving significant economic changes through automation and technological advancements, leading to both job displacement and the creation of new roles, necessitating widespread workforce reskilling and systemic adaptation.

=== Social ===
- Privacy concerns
- Surveillance and distrust
- General reluctance to change by stakeholders
- Threat of redundancy of the corporate IT department
- Loss of many jobs to automatic processes and IT-controlled processes, especially for blue-collar workers
- Increased risk of gender inequalities in professions with job roles most susceptible to replacement with AI

=== Political ===
- Lack of regulation, standards, and forms of certifications
- Unclear legal issues and data security

=== Organizational ===
- IT security issues, which are greatly aggravated by the inherent need to open up previously closed production shops
- Reliability and stability needed for critical machine-to-machine communication (M2M), including very short and stable latency times
- Need to maintain the integrity of production processes
- Need to avoid any IT snags, as those would cause expensive production outages
- Need to protect industrial know-how (contained also in the control files for the industrial automation gear)
- Lack of adequate skill-sets to expedite the transition towards Industry 4.0
- Low top management commitment
- Insufficient qualification of employees

== Country applications ==
Many countries have set up institutional mechanisms to foster the adoption of Industry 4.0 technologies.

=== Australia ===
Australia has a Digital Transformation Agency (est. 2015) and the Prime Minister's Industry 4.0 Taskforce (est. 2016), which promotes collaboration with industry groups in Germany and the USA.

=== Brazil ===
Brazil's embrace of Industry 4.0 technologies has been a slow and inconsistent process. Initial assessments clearly indicated a considerable gap in digital preparedness among the nation's industrial businesses. A significant survey, conducted by the National Confederation of Industry, revealed concerning statistics: 42% of Brazilian companies were completely unaware of how crucial digital technologies are for industrial competitiveness. Furthermore, a substantial 46% either weren't utilizing these technologies or were unsure about their application. These findings collectively underscored a widespread lack of awareness and readiness for digital transformation across the Brazilian industrial landscape.

=== Germany ===
The term "Industrie 4.0", shortened to I4.0 or simply I4, originated in 2011 from a project in the high-tech strategy of the German government and specifically relates to that project policy, rather than a wider notion of a Fourth Industrial Revolution of 4IR, which promotes the computerisation of manufacturing. The term "Industrie 4.0" was publicly introduced in the same year at the Hannover Fair. German professor Wolfgang Wahlster is sometimes called the inventor of the "Industry 4.0" term. In October 2012, the Working Group on Industry 4.0 presented a set of Industry 4.0 implementation recommendations to the German federal government. The workgroup members and partners are recognised as the founding fathers and driving force behind Industry 4.0. On 8 April 2013 at the Hannover Fair, the final report of the Working Group Industry 4.0 was presented. This working group was headed by Siegfried Dais, of Robert Bosch GmbH, and Henning Kagermann, of the German Academy of Science and Engineering.

As Industry 4.0 principles have been applied by companies, they have sometimes been rebranded. For example, the aerospace parts manufacturer Meggitt PLC has branded its own Industry 4.0 research project M4.

In Germany, the impact of the shift to Industry 4.0 (and especially digitisation) on the labour market has been discussed under the heading "Work 4.0".

The federal government in Germany is a leader in the development of the I4.0 policy through its ministries of the German federal Ministry of Education and Research (BMBF) and BMWi. Through the publishing of set objectives and goals for enterprises to achieve, the German federal government attempts to set the direction of the digital transformation. However, there is a gap between German enterprise's collaboration and knowledge of these set policies. The biggest challenge SMEs in Germany are currently facing regarding digital transformation of their manufacturing processes is ensuring that there is a concrete IT and application landscape to support further digital transformation efforts.

The characteristics of the German government's Industry 4.0 strategy involve the strong customisation of products under the conditions of highly flexible (mass-) production. The required automation technology is improved by the introduction of methods of self-optimization, self-configuration, self-diagnosis, cognition and intelligent support of workers in their increasingly complex work. The largest project in Industry 4.0 as of July 2013 is the BMBF leading-edge cluster "Intelligent Technical Systems Ostwestfalen-Lippe (its OWL)". Another major project is the BMBF project RES-COM, as well as the Cluster of Excellence "Integrative Production Technology for High-Wage Countries". In 2015, the European Commission started the international Horizon 2020 research project CREMA (cloud-based rapid elastic manufacturing) as a major initiative to foster the Industry 4.0 topic.

=== Estonia ===
In Estonia, the digital transformation dubbed as the 4th Industrial Revolution by Klaus Schwab and the World Economic Forum in 2015 started with the restoration of independence in 1991. Although a latecomer to the information revolution due to 50 years of Soviet occupation, Estonia leapfrogged to the digital era, while skipping the analogue connections almost completely. The early decisions made by Prime Minister Mart Laar on the course of the country's economic development led to the establishment of what is today known as e-Estonia, one of the worlds most digitally advanced nations.

According to the goals set in Estonia's Digital Agenda 2030, the next advances in the country's digital transformation will involve switching to event-based and proactive services, both in private and business environments, as well as developing a green, AI-powered, and human-centric digital government.

=== Indonesia ===
Another example is the Indonesian initiative Making Indonesia 4.0, which focuses on improving industrial performance.

=== India ===
India, with its expanding economy and extensive manufacturing sector, has embraced the digital revolution, leading to significant advancements in manufacturing. The Indian program for Industry 4.0 centres around leveraging technology to produce globally competitive products at cost-effective rates while adopting the latest technological advancements of Industry 4.0.

=== Japan ===
The Society 5.0 proposal by the Japanese government in 2015 envisions a society that prioritizes the well-being of its citizens, striking a harmonious balance between economic progress and the effective addressing of societal challenges through a closely interconnected system of both the digital realm and the physical world. This concept was introduced in 2019 in the 5th Science and Technology Basic Plan for Japanese Government as a blueprint for a forthcoming societal framework.

=== Malaysia ===
Malaysia's national policy on Industry 4.0 is known as Industry4WRD. Launched in 2018, key initiatives in this policy include enhancing digital infrastructure, equipping the workforce with 4IR skills, and fostering innovation and technology adoption across industries.

=== South Africa ===
South Africa appointed a Presidential Commission on the Fourth Industrial Revolution in 2019, consisting of about 30 stakeholders with a background in academia, industry and government. South Africa has also established an Inter ministerial Committee on Industry 4.0.

A nationwide survey of 577 lecturers in Technical Engineering at 52 TVET college campuses across South Africa found that 52.3% of participants were unaware of technological advancements in their area of specialization and their potential impact on technical training. These findings indicate that South African TVET lecturers have limited awareness of the technological advancements needed to participate effectively in the 4IR era. Accordingly, South African Minister of Higher Education, Blade Nzimande, placed the upskilling of TVET lecturers' 4IR-related skills high on the ministry's agenda.

=== South Korea ===
The Republic of Korea has had a Presidential Committee on the Fourth Industrial Revolution since 2017. The Republic of Korea's I-Korea strategy (2017) is focusing on new growth engines that include AI, drones, and autonomous cars, in line with the government's innovation-driven economic policy.

=== Uganda ===
Uganda adopted its own National 4IR Strategy in October 2020 with emphasis on e-governance, urban management (smart cities), healthcare, education, agriculture, and the digital economy; to support local businesses, the government was contemplating introducing a local start-ups bill in 2020 which would require all accounting officers to exhaust the local market prior to procuring digital solutions from abroad.

=== United Kingdom ===
In a policy paper published in 2019, the UK's Department for Business, Energy & Industrial Strategy, titled "Regulation for the Fourth Industrial Revolution", outlined the need to evolve current regulatory models to remain competitive in evolving technological and social settings.

=== United States ===
The Department of Homeland Security in 2019 published a paper called 'The Industrial Internet of things (IIOT): Opportunities, Risks, Mitigation'. The base pieces of critical infrastructure are increasingly digitised for greater connectivity and optimisation. Hence, its implementation, growth and maintenance must be carefully planned and safeguarded. The paper discusses not only applications of IIOT but also the associated risks. It has suggested some key areas where risk mitigation is possible. To increase coordination between the public, private, law enforcement, academia and other stakeholders the DHS formed the National Cybersecurity and Communications Integration Center (NCCIC).

== Industry applications ==
The aerospace industry has sometimes been characterised as "too low volume for extensive automation". However, Industry 4.0 principles have been investigated by several aerospace companies, and technologies have been developed to improve productivity where the upfront cost of automation cannot be justified. One example of this is the aerospace parts manufacturer Meggitt PLC's M4 project.

The increasing use of the industrial internet of things is referred to as Industry 4.0 at Bosch, and generally in Germany. Applications include machines that can predict failures and trigger maintenance processes autonomously or self-organised coordination that react to unexpected changes in production. in 2017, Bosch launched the Connectory, a Chicago, Illinois based innovation incubator that specializes in IoT, including Industry 4.0.

Industry 4.0 inspired Innovation 4.0, a move toward digitisation for academia and research and development. In 2017, the £81M Materials Innovation Factory (MIF) at the University of Liverpool opened as a centre for computer aided materials science, where robotic formulation, data capture, and modelling are being integrated into development practices.

== Future ==
=== Industry 5.0 ===
Industry 5.0 has been proposed as a strategy to create a paradigm shift for an industrial landscape in which the primary focus should no longer be on increasing efficiency, but rather on promoting the well-being of society and sustainability of the economy and industrial production. This shift in production that appears more "human friendly" is the expected outcome of Industry 4.0 (less labour, fewer facilities, less materials) evolving towards smaller localized flexible JIT manufacturing facilities since long distance transportation and distribution will become the greater remaining costs to reduce.

== See also ==
- AI boom – Period of rapid progress in AI
- AI bubble – Concept asserting ongoing stock market bubble
- Artificial general intelligence – Type of hypothetical AI with wide-ranging abilities
- Artificial superintelligence – Hypothetical agent surpassing human intelligence
- Collapsology – Study of the risks of collapse of industrial civilization
- Computer-integrated manufacturing – Manufacturing controlled by computers
- Criticism of capitalism – Arguments against the economic system of capitalism
- Cryptocurrency bubble – Speculative bubble involving cryptocurrency prices
- Cyber manufacturing – Concept derived from cyber-physical systems
- Digital modelling and fabrication – Design and production process
- Digital twin – Digital replica of a living or non-living physical entity
- Effective accelerationism – Philosophical and social movement
- Industrial control system – Process control systems and associated instrumentation
- Intelligent maintenance system – System that uses collected data from machinery
- Lights out (manufacturing) – Designing automated factories to not require humans on-site
- List of emerging technologies – New technologies actively in development
- Machine to machine – Communication between devices
- Nondestructive Evaluation 4.0 – Concept of industrial testing and evaluation for the digital age
- Simulation software – Software that models a real phenomenon with a set of mathematical formulas
- Technological convergence – Aspect of technological change
- Technological singularity – Hypothetical event
- Technological unemployment – Unemployment caused by technological change
- The War on Normal People, 2018 essay written by Andrew Yang
- TESCREAL – Proposed ideological bundle
- Ubiquitous computing – Concept in software engineering and computer science
- Work 4.0 – Term related to the transformation of work and technology
- You'll own nothing and be happy – Phrase used by critics of the World Economic Forum
