= Cyber-physical system =

Computer system

Cyber-physical systems (CPS) are mechanisms controlled and monitored by computer algorithms, tightly integrated with the internet and its users. In cyber-physical systems, physical and software components are deeply intertwined, able to operate on different spatial and temporal scales, exhibit multiple and distinct behavioral modalities, and interact with each other in ways that change with context.

CPS involves transdisciplinary approaches, merging theory of cybernetics, mechatronics, design and process science. The process control is often referred to as embedded systems. In embedded systems, the emphasis tends to be more on the computational elements, and less on an intense link between the computational and physical elements. CPS is also similar to the Internet of Things (IoT), sharing the same basic architecture; nevertheless, CPS presents a higher combination and coordination between physical and computational elements.

Examples of CPS include smart grid, autonomous automobile systems, medical monitoring, industrial control systems, robotics systems, recycling and automatic pilot avionics. Precursors of cyber-physical systems can be found in areas as diverse as aerospace, automotive, chemical processes, civil infrastructure, energy, healthcare, manufacturing, transportation, entertainment, and consumer appliances.

== Overview ==
Unlike more traditional embedded systems, a full-fledged CPS is typically designed as a network of interacting elements with physical input and output instead of as standalone devices. The notion is closely tied to concepts of robotics and sensor networks with intelligence mechanisms proper of computational intelligence leading the pathway. Ongoing advances in science and engineering improve the link between computational and physical elements by means of intelligent mechanisms, increasing the adaptability, autonomy, efficiency, functionality, reliability, safety, and usability of cyber-physical systems. This will broaden the potential of cyber-physical systems in several directions, including: intervention (e.g., collision avoidance); precision (e.g., robotic surgery and nano-level manufacturing); operation in dangerous or inaccessible environments (e.g., search and rescue, firefighting, and deep-sea exploration); coordination (e.g., air traffic control, war fighting); efficiency (e.g., zero-net energy buildings); and augmentation of human capabilities (e.g. in healthcare monitoring and delivery).

== Mobile cyber-physical systems ==
Mobile cyber-physical systems, in which the physical system under study has inherent mobility, are a prominent subcategory of cyber-physical systems. Examples of mobile physical systems include mobile robotics and electronics transported by humans or animals. The rise in popularity of smartphones has increased interest in the area of mobile cyber-physical systems. Smartphone platforms make ideal mobile cyber-physical systems for a number of reasons, including:

- Significant computational resources, such as processing capability, local storage
- Multiple sensory input/output devices, such as touch screens, cameras, GPS chips, speakers, microphone, light sensors, proximity sensors
- Multiple communication mechanisms, such as WiFi, 4G, EDGE, Bluetooth for interconnecting devices to either the Internet, or to other devices
- High-level programming languages that enable rapid development of mobile CPS node software, such as Java, C#, or JavaScript
- Readily available application distribution mechanisms, such as Google Play Store and Apple App Store
- End-user maintenance and upkeep, including frequent re-charging of the battery

For tasks that require more resources than are locally available, one common mechanism for rapid implementation of smartphone-based mobile cyber-physical system nodes utilizes the network connectivity to link the mobile system with either a server or a cloud environment, enabling complex processing tasks that are impossible under local resource constraints. Examples of mobile cyber-physical systems include applications to track and analyze CO_{2} emissions, detect traffic accidents, insurance telematics and provide situational awareness services to first responders, measure traffic, and monitor cardiac patients.

== Examples ==
Common applications of CPS typically fall under sensor-based communication-enabled autonomous systems. For example, many wireless sensor networks monitor some aspect of the environment and relay the processed information to a central node. Other types of CPS include smart grid, autonomous automotive systems, medical monitoring, process control systems, distributed robotics, recycling and automatic pilot avionics.

A real-world example of such a system is the Distributed Robot Garden at MIT in which a team of robots tend a garden of tomato plants. This system combines distributed sensing (each plant is equipped with a sensor node monitoring its status), navigation, manipulation and wireless networking.

A focus on the control system aspects of CPS that pervade critical infrastructure can be found in the efforts of the Idaho National Laboratory and collaborators researching resilient control systems. This effort takes a holistic approach to next generation design, and considers the resilience aspects that are not well quantified, such as cyber security, human interaction and complex interdependencies.

Another example is MIT's ongoing CarTel project where a fleet of taxis work by collecting real-time traffic information in the Boston area. Together with historical data, this information is then used for calculating fastest routes for a given time of the day.

CPS are also used in electric grids to perform advanced control, especially in the smart grids context to enhance the integration of distributed renewable generation.The Special remedial action scheme are needed to limit the current flows in the grid when wind farm generation is too high. Distributed CPS are a key solution for this type of issues

In industry the cyber-physical systems empowered by Cloud technologies have led to novel approaches that paved the path to Industry 4.0 as the European Commission IMC-AESOP project with partners such as Schneider Electric, SAP, Honeywell, Microsoft etc. demonstrated. In the area of digital agriculture (alternately precision agriculture), CPS technologies are used for measurement of soil quality and moisture content and determining the right level of irrigation or fertilizer or pesticide usage.

== Design ==
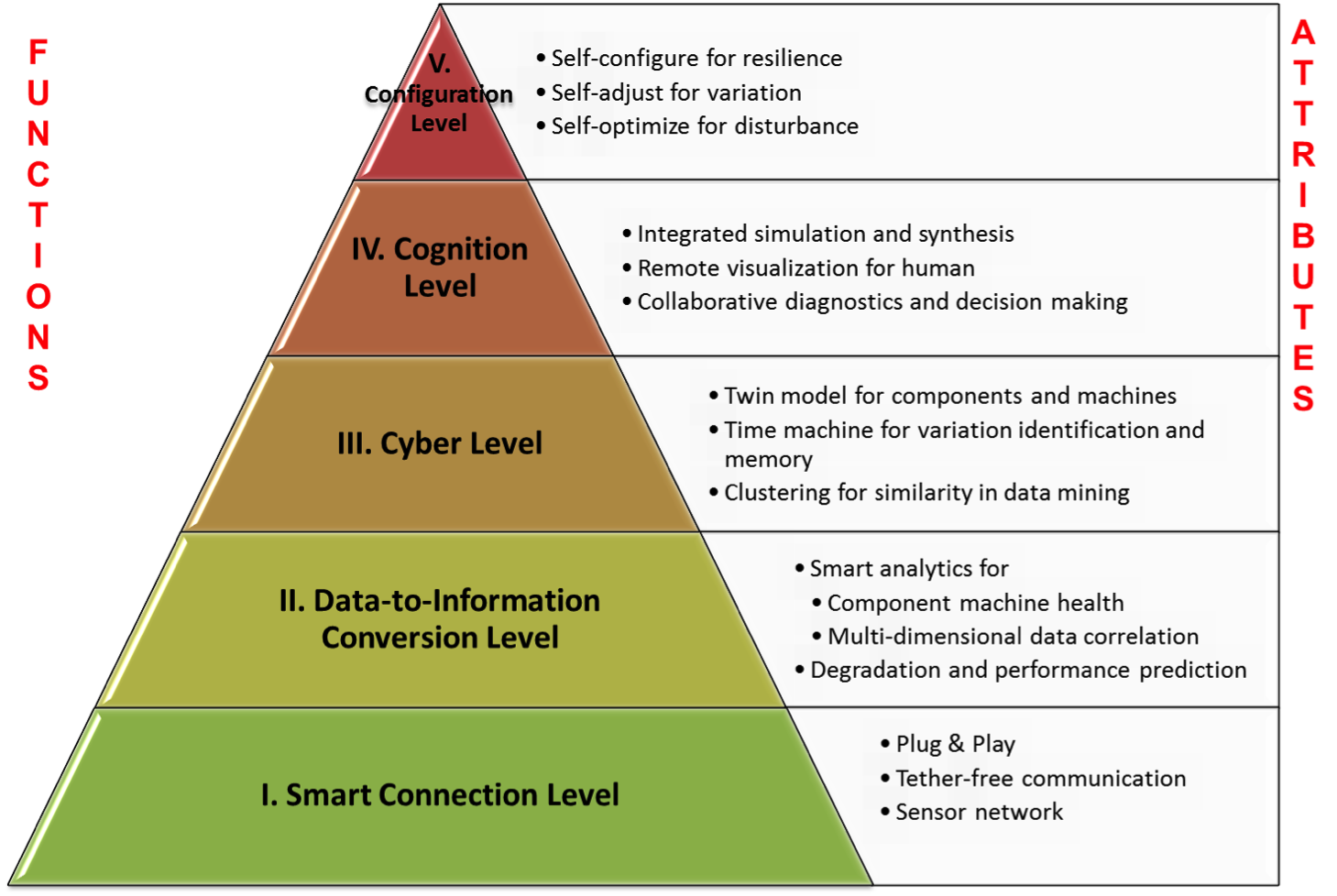

A challenge in the development of embedded and cyber-physical systems is the large differences in the design practice between the various engineering disciplines involved, such as software and mechanical engineering. Additionally, as of today there is no "language" in terms of design practice that is common to all the involved disciplines in CPS. Today, in a marketplace where rapid innovation is assumed to be essential, engineers from all disciplines need to be able to explore system designs collaboratively, allocating responsibilities to software and physical elements, and analyzing trade-offs between them. Recent advances show that coupling disciplines by using co-simulation will allow disciplines to cooperate without enforcing new tools or design methods. Results from the MODELISAR project show that this approach is viable by proposing a new standard for co-simulation in the form of the Functional Mock-up Interface.

== Importance ==
The US National Science Foundation (NSF) has identified cyber-physical systems as a key area of research. Through its CPS Program, it awards "Frontier" projects that are large-scale projects ($5-7M each) meant to significantly move the CPS technology forward. Starting in late 2006, the NSF and other United States federal agencies sponsored several workshops on cyber-physical systems.

== See also ==
- Digital twin
- Indoor positioning system
- Industry 4.0
- Intelligent maintenance system
- Internet of Things
- Responsive computer-aided design
- Signal-flow graph
