= Aden Group =

- Type: Private
- Industry: Energy management, renewable energy, digital twin, integrated facility management, industrial real estate,
- Founded: 1997; 29 years ago
- Key people: Joachim Poylo, Co-founder & President; Francois Amman, Co-founder & Co-president.
- Number of employees: 26,000
- Website: adengroup.com

Aden Group is a Eurasian group founded in 1997. Aden Group began in the integrated facility management (IFM) industry, and has since expanded its portfolio to dedicated businesses specialized in on-site energy, industrial real estate, and digital twin.

Aden employs approximately 26,000 people worldwide, and has operations in 25 countries. Aden Group's largest base of business is the Asia-Pacific market, where it was founded, but Aden also manages client sites in Africa and its digital twin business operates in Europe, Africa and North America.

Today, Aden Group's primary businesses are:

- Aden Services – integrated facility management and property management
- Aden Energies – on-site energy
- NXpark by Aden – industrial real estate
- Akila – digital twin and engineering
