= Arskan =

French computer software company

ARSKAN
- Formation: December 1, 2016; 9 years ago
- Dissolved: February 1, 2023; 3 years ago
- Headquarters: Lyon, France
- Owners: Jemfi Invest Pulsalys 1Kubator JG Grive
- Founder, Chairman & CEO: Jean-Gabriel Grivé

Arskan was a computer software company that was based in Lyon, France. It was founded in 2016 and developed technologies that allowed the visualisation of 3D data.

== Description ==
Arskan was a French company that developed technology for the compression and progressive transfer of massive 3D data. The technology originated from the research work of the LIRIS. They allow data visualization of massive 3D data on the web and are patented.

In 2017, Arskan and SATT Pulsalys signed an operating license for technologies from the Laboratory of Computer Science in Image and Information Systems (LIRIS).

In February 2023, Arskan went into liquidation.

== Services ==
Arskan marketed technologies for viewing and exploiting complex 3D files on the Internet. The size of the files is then reduced using compression algorithms, a technology from LIRIS, allowing the exploitation of data from massive 3D files.

== Digital twins ==
Arskan had been part of the CAJuN consortium: Automated creation and management of a collaborative, interactive and real-time digital twin. The other stakeholders in this consortium are Lyon Parc Auto, National Center for Scientific Research (CNRS), National Institute of Applied Sciences of Rennes (INSA) and Pulsalys.

== Projects ==
=== CAJuN project ===
For its first customer and beta-tester, Lyon Parc Auto, a parking operator company located in Lyon, ARSKAN generated the digital twin of the Cordeliers car park.

This is the CAJuN project, a consortium created at the instigation of ARSKAN, 40% financed by private funds and by public funds

A beta test is underway with a start-up from Roanne, to integrate data from its predictive maintenance algorithm into the digital twin generated by ARSKAN.

=== JUMOA project ===
The JUMOA project was launched in partnership with EDF Hydro to solve problems related to the maintenance of engineering structures and sensitive sites.

=== Fine arts and heritage ===
Arskan intervened for the Museum of Fine Arts of Lyon, generating the digital double of the statue of Korè, as well as the gallery of the doors of the Médamoud Temple
