= ISHM =

ISHM may refer to:

- International Society for the History of Medicine
- Integrated System Health Management
