= Centralized digital thread =

Centralized digital thread refers to an approach to digital thread architecture in which product information is consolidated into a shared repository rather than maintained exclusively across separate departmental or organizational systems. A digital thread connects information generated throughout a product's product lifecycle, including design, manufacturing, and operations. Centralized implementations can provide an integrated view of product information and establish a common source of data for stakeholders across the lifecycle.

Illustration of a centralized digital thread architecture, showing information from multiple engineering and software systems converging in a shared repository.

Centralized approaches differ from federated digital thread approaches, in which information remains in its source systems and relationships between data are established through integration mechanisms.

== Background and history ==
The development of the digital thread concept is closely associated with aerospace, defense, and manufacturing applications, where organizations must manage complex engineering information across multiple stages of a product's lifecycle.

Historically, engineering and manufacturing information was often maintained in separate systems and databases. The development of Product data management (PDM) and broader Product lifecycle management (PLM) systems provided increasingly integrated approaches for managing product information across design, manufacturing, and support activities.

Research into digital-thread architectures has identified both centralized repository approaches and approaches that connect heterogeneous systems without requiring all information to be consolidated into a single repository.

== Concept and definitions ==
A digital thread is a data-driven architecture that links information generated across a product lifecycle. In a centralized digital thread, this connection is implemented by collecting product information into a common repository or platform. Such an architecture can provide a consolidated view of product information and allow data generated by different lifecycle activities to be accessed through a common system.

Instead of retaining information solely within the specialized software used to create it, information can be transferred or replicated into a central repository. The repository can serve as a common reference for product information, including files, versions, relationships, and metadata.

Data transformation and integration are important aspects of digital-thread implementations because product lifecycle systems commonly generate data in different formats and structures. Information from different systems may be transformed into standardized or compatible representations so that it can be accessed and processed consistently.

== Architecture and components ==
A centralized digital thread uses a data architecture designed to collect and manage information generated across the product lifecycle. Typical components include a central repository, data-integration mechanisms, applications that generate product information, and interfaces through which users access the information.

Central data repository: A database, data warehouse, or data lake can serve as the primary storage location for product information. Product lifecycle management (PLM) systems may provide a centralized platform for managing and integrating product-related information, processes, and collaboration across departments and lifecycle stages.

Data pipelines: Data-integration processes can extract information from individual software systems, transform it into compatible representations, and load it into a central repository. This process may use Extract, transform, load (ETL) technologies and other forms of data integration.

Unified user interface: A dashboard or portal can provide users with access to information collected in the central repository. This can provide stakeholders with a consolidated view of product information without requiring direct access to every system in which the information was originally created.

== Advantages and limitations ==
The implementation of a centralized digital thread presents specific operational benefits and structural challenges.

By consolidating product information into a single shared repository, typically anchored by an existing Product Lifecycle Management (PLM) system, organizations establish a strict single source of truth. Because this architecture translates incoming information into one standard format , it facilitates comprehensive reporting and analytics. Stakeholders can generate detailed product insights without needing to query multiple disparate databases.

However, the centralized model introduces several scaling and operational limitations. Storing all product lifecycle data in one main database creates significant storage and performance bottlenecks as data volume increases over time. The model can also generate knowledge inequality across an organization; departments operating outside the central administrative group may lack visibility into the thread, which can reduce their operational velocity. Furthermore, relying on a single central hub often increases software costs, as every user requiring access to the digital thread must secure a license or provisioning for the primary repository system.

== Use cases and applications ==
Centralized digital threads are particularly valuable in scenarios that require strict data control and long-term storage:

Heavily regulated industries: In sectors such as nuclear energy, medical device manufacturing, and commercial aviation, regulatory bodies require strict, auditable histories for every component. A centralized thread provides a single, secure database to support compliance audits and trace part histories. Stark, J. (2015). Product Lifecycle Management: Volume 1: 21st Century Paradigm for Product Realisation. Springer. Automotive mass production: Original equipment manufacturers (OEMs) uses centralized systems to maintain strict control over the bill of materials (BOM) across global manufacturing plants. This ensures all facilities build from the exact same data set, which reduces the risk of errors. Grieves, M. (2006). Product Lifecycle Management: Driving the Next Generation of Lean Thinking. McGraw-Hill. Historical archiving: Centralized models are frequently used for long-term data retention and archiving. By collecting data in a central database, the information is preserved even if the original software used to create it becomes obsolete or is no longer supported. Sudarsan, R., et al. (2005). "A product information modelling framework for product lifecycle management". Computer-Aided Design.

== Related concepts ==
Digital twin: A digital twin links a physical system or product with a corresponding virtual representation. Digital-thread architectures provide lifecycle information that can support the creation and operation of digital twins by connecting information generated during design, production, and operation.

Federated digital thread: A federated digital thread represents an alternative architecture in which product information remains distributed among its original systems while relationships between information from different systems are established through integration and linking mechanisms. Research into digital-thread architectures has examined approaches for linking data across heterogeneous repositories rather than consolidating all information in one repository.
