= STS-96 =

1999 American crewed spaceflight to the ISS

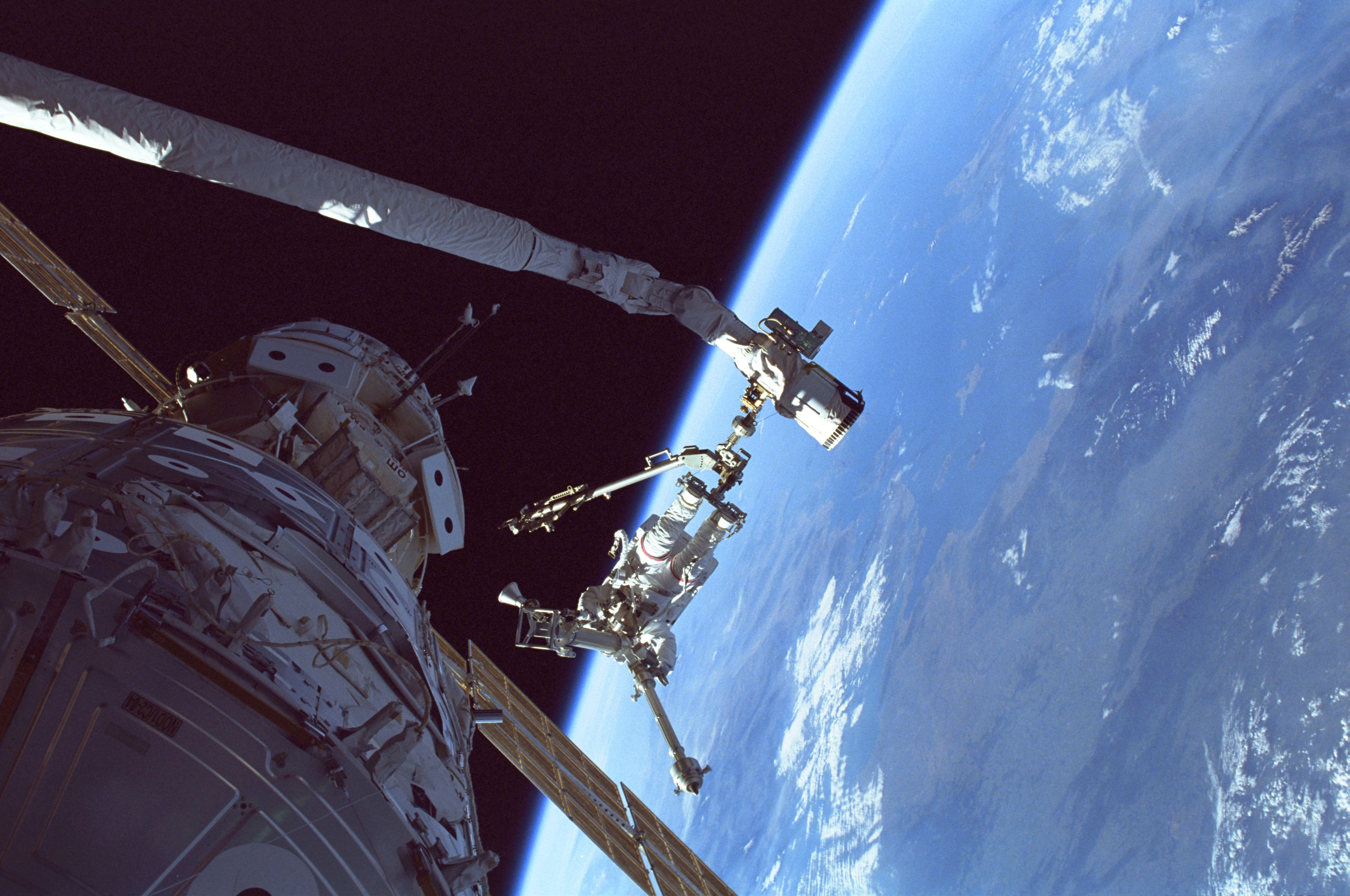
- Jernigan outside Unity, during the mission's only EVA
- Names: Space Transportation System-96
- Mission type: ISS assembly ISS logistics
- Operator: NASA
- COSPAR ID: 1999-030A
- SATCAT no.: 25760
- Mission duration: 9 days, 19 hours, 13 minutes, 57 seconds
- Distance travelled: 6,000,000 kilometres (3,700,000 mi)

Spacecraft properties
- Spacecraft: Space Shuttle Discovery
- Launch mass: 118,857 kilograms (262,035 lb)
- Landing mass: 100,230 kilograms (220,980 lb)
- Payload mass: 9,097 kilograms (20,056 lb)

Crew
- Crew size: 7
- Members: Kent V. Rominger; Rick D. Husband; Daniel T. Barry; Ellen Ochoa; Tamara E. Jernigan; Julie Payette; Valeri I. Tokarev

Start of mission
- Launch date: 27 May 1999, 10:49:42 UTC
- Launch site: Kennedy, LC-39B

End of mission
- Landing date: 6 June 1999, 06:02:43 UTC
- Landing site: Kennedy, SLF Runway 15

Orbital parameters
- Reference system: Geocentric
- Regime: Low Earth
- Perigee altitude: 326 kilometres (203 mi)
- Apogee altitude: 340 kilometres (210 mi)
- Inclination: 51.6 degrees
- Period: 91.2 min

Docking with ISS
- Docking port: PMA-2 (Unity forward)
- Docking date: 29 May 1999, 04:23 UTC
- Undocking date: 3 June 1999, 22:39 UTC
- Time docked: 5 days, 18 hours, 15 minutes
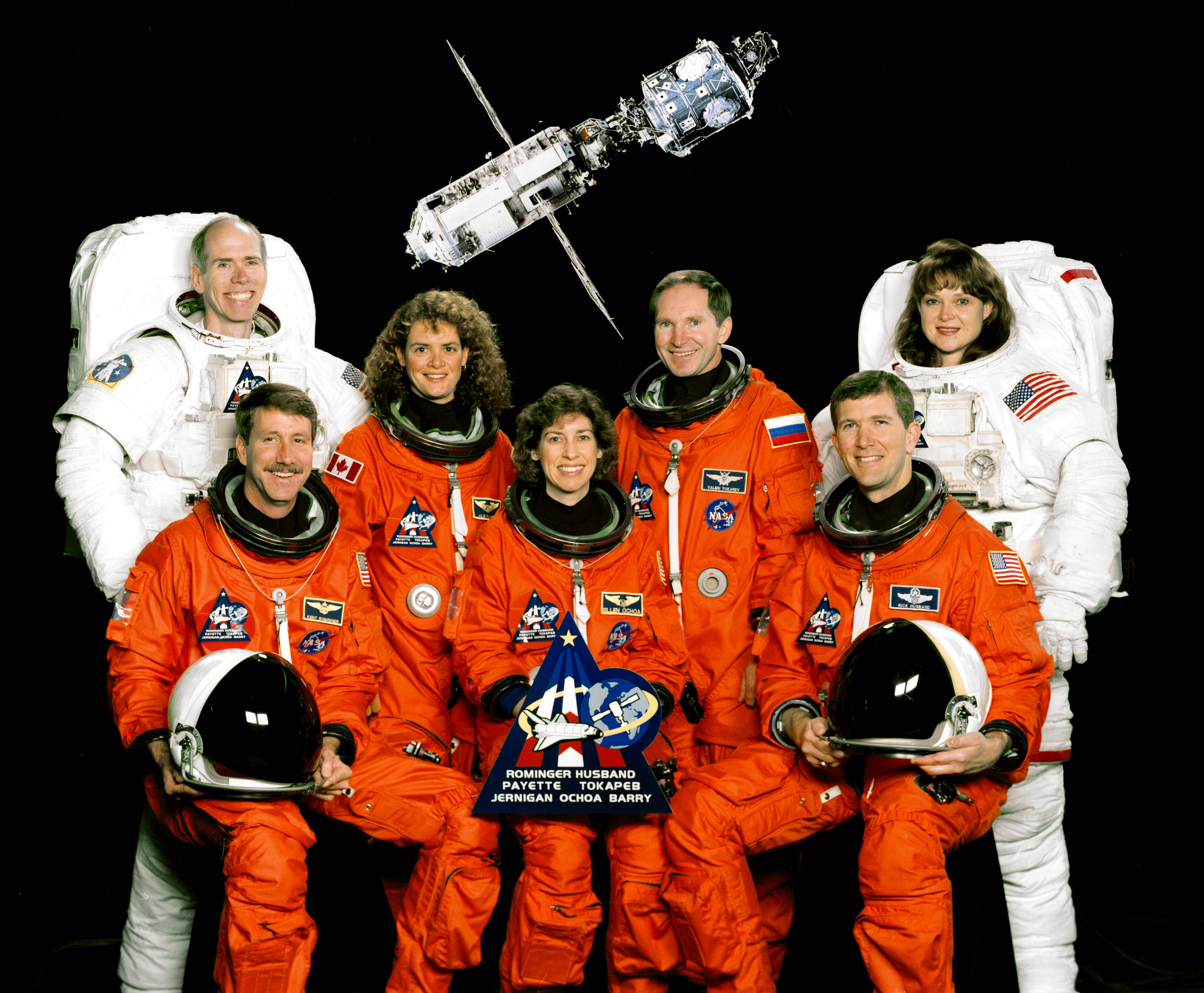
- Left to right - Front row: Rominger, Ochoa, Husband; Back row: Barry, Payette, Tokarev, Jernigan Space Shuttle program

STS-96 was a Space Shuttle mission to the International Space Station (ISS) flown by Space Shuttle Discovery, and the first shuttle flight to dock (Note: Although STS-96 was the first Space Shuttle mission to perform a docking maneuver with the ISS, it was not the first to visit the station. During the previous mission, STS-88, the Space Shuttle Endeavour used the Canadarm to first attach the newly delivered Unity module to its airlock, then grasp the Zarya module to join it with Unity. Because the Shuttle's robotic arm was used to connect both modules to the spacecraft, this counted as a berthing rather than a docking despite the final configuration being identical to STS-96. See Docking and berthing of spacecraft) at the International Space Station. It was Discovery's 26th flight. The shuttle carried the Spacehab module in the payload, filled with cargo for station outfitting. STS-96 launched from Kennedy Space Center, Florida, on 27 May 1999 at 06:49:42 AM EDT and returned to Kennedy on 6 June 1999, 2:02:43 AM EDT.

== Crew ==
Position	Astronaut
Commander	(United States) Kent V. Rominger; Fourth spaceflight
Pilot	(United States) Rick D. Husband; First spaceflight
Mission Specialist 1 EVA Specialist 1	(United States) Daniel T. Barry; Second spaceflight
Mission Specialist 2 Flight Engineer Payload Commander RMS Operator	(United States) Ellen Ochoa; Third spaceflight
Mission Specialist 3 EVA Specialist 2	(United States) Tamara E. Jernigan; Fifth and last spaceflight
Mission Specialist 4 Intravehicular Support	(Canada) Julie Payette, CSA; First spaceflight
Mission Specialist 5	(Russia) Valeri I. Tokarev, RKA; First spaceflight

=== Space walk ===
- Jernigan and Barry – EVA 1
- EVA 1 Start: 30 May 1999 – 02:56 UTC
- EVA 1 End: 30 May 1999 – 10:51 UTC
- Duration: 7 hours, 55 minutes

=== Crew seat assignments ===
Seat	Launch	Landing	Seats 1–4 are on the flight deck. Seats 5–7 are on the mid-deck.
1	Rominger		Seats 1–4 are on the flight deck. Seats 5–7 are on the mid-deck.
2	Husband		Seats 1–4 are on the flight deck. Seats 5–7 are on the mid-deck.
3	Barry	Payette	Seats 1–4 are on the flight deck. Seats 5–7 are on the mid-deck.
4	Ochoa		Seats 1–4 are on the flight deck. Seats 5–7 are on the mid-deck.
5	Jernigan		Seats 1–4 are on the flight deck. Seats 5–7 are on the mid-deck.
6	Payette	Barry	Seats 1–4 are on the flight deck. Seats 5–7 are on the mid-deck.
7	Tokarev		Seats 1–4 are on the flight deck. Seats 5–7 are on the mid-deck.

== Mission highlights ==
Illustration of the International Space Station (ISS) during Space Shuttle flight STS-96

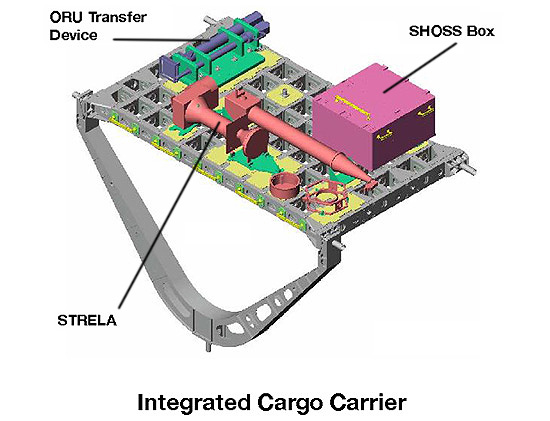
Integrated Cargo Carrier (ICC), with among other the Russian cargo crane "STRELA", which was mounted on the ISS

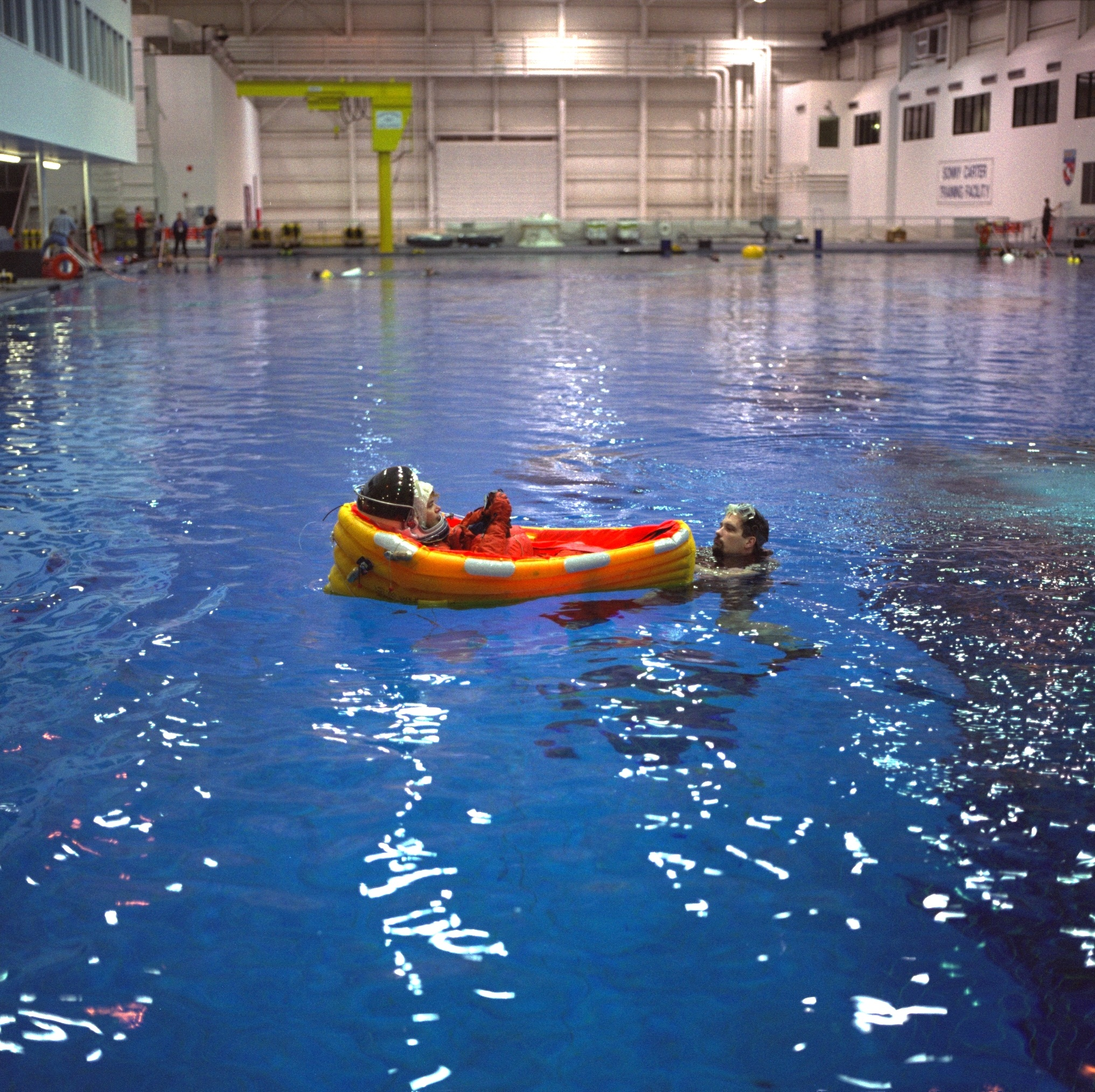
Mission Specialist Julie Payette during emergency bailout training, 8 January 1999.

STS-96 was a logistics and resupply mission for the International Space Station carrying the Spacehab Double Module (DM) 13th Spacehab overall (6th dual module use).

Space Shuttle Discovery carried to the ISS an Integrated Cargo Carrier (ICC) with parts for the Russian cargo crane STRELA, which was mounted to the exterior of the Russian station segment. Furthermore, the ICC carried the SPACEHAB Oceaneering Space System Box (SHOSS) and the "ORU Transfer Device" (OTD), a U.S. built crane.

Other payloads on STS-96 were the Student Tracked Atmospheric Research Satellite for Heuristic International Networking Equipment (STARSHINE), the Shuttle Vibration Forces Experiment (SVF) and the Orbiter Integrated Vehicle Health Monitoring – HEDS Technology Demonstration (IVHM HTD).

The STARSHINE satellite consists of an inert, 483 millimetres (19.0 in) hollow sphere covered by 1,000 evenly distributed, flat, polished mirrors, each 1 inch in diameter. The payload consists of the STARSHINE satellite, integrated with the Pallet Ejection System (PES), then mounted inside a lidless carrier. The HH equipment consists of one HH Lightweight Avionics Plate (LAP), then mounted inside a lidless carrier. Additional HH equipment consists of one Hitchhiker Ejection System Electronics (HESE), one 5.0 cubic-foot (142 L) HH canister, and one Adapter Beam Assembly (ABA). The purpose of the mission was to train international student volunteer observers to visually track this optically reflective spacecraft during morning and evening twilight intervals for several months, calculate its orbit from shared observations, and derive atmospheric density from drag-induced changes in its orbit over time.

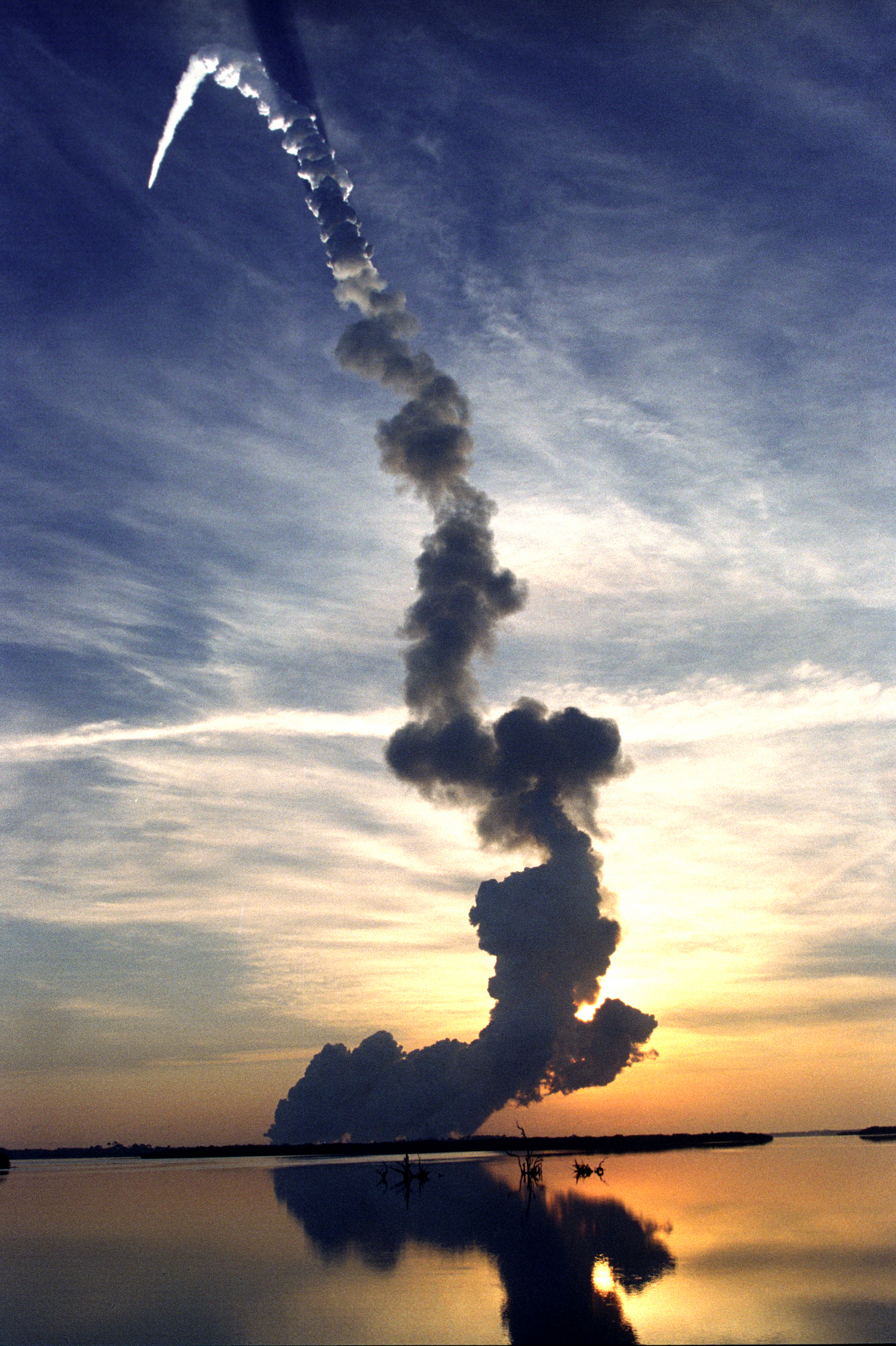
Space Shuttle Discovery launches on STS-96 from Kennedy Space Center, 27 May 1999.

The Shuttle Vibration Forces (SVF) Experiment provided flight measurements of the vibratory forces acting between an aerospace payload and its mounting structure. The force transducers were incorporated into four custom brackets which replaced the existing brackets used to attach the 5 ft (1.5 m) standard canister to the side wall GAS adapter beam. The payload was activated automatically by the Orbiter Lift-off vibration and operated for approximately 100 seconds. STS-96 was the second flight of the SVF experiment.

The purpose of the Orbiter Integrated Vehicle Health Monitoring- HEDS Technology Demonstration (IVHM HTD) was to demonstrate competing modern, off-the-shelf sensing technologies in an operational environment to make informed design decisions for the eventual Orbiter upgrade IVHM. The objective of IVHM was to reduce planned ground processing, streamline problem troubleshooting (unplanned ground processing), enhance visibility into systems operation and improve overall vehicle safety.

A copy of Blizzard Entertainment's StarCraft real-time strategy game was also flown aboard STS-96. It resides at Blizzard's headquarters in Irvine, California.

== Wake-up calls ==
NASA began a tradition of playing music to astronauts during the Gemini program, which was first used to wake up a flight crew during Apollo 15. Each track is specially chosen, often by their families, and usually has a special meaning to an individual member of the crew, or is applicable to their daily activities.

Flight Day	Song	Artist/Composer
Day 2	"California Dreamin"	Mamas and the Papas
Day 3	"Danger Zone"	Kenny Loggins
Day 4	Themes from Star Wars	Space Center Intermediate Band
Day 5	"Morning Colors"	US Coast Guard Band
Day 6	"Amarillo by Morning"	George Strait
Day 7	"Exultate Jubilate"	Mozart
Day 9	"Free Bird"	Lynyrd Skynyrd

== See also ==
- List of human spaceflights
- List of International Space Station spacewalks
- List of Space Shuttle missions
- List of spacewalks and moonwalks 1965–1999
- Outline of space science
