= Tamara E. Jernigan =

American astronaut and astrophysicist (born 1959)

Tammy Jernigan
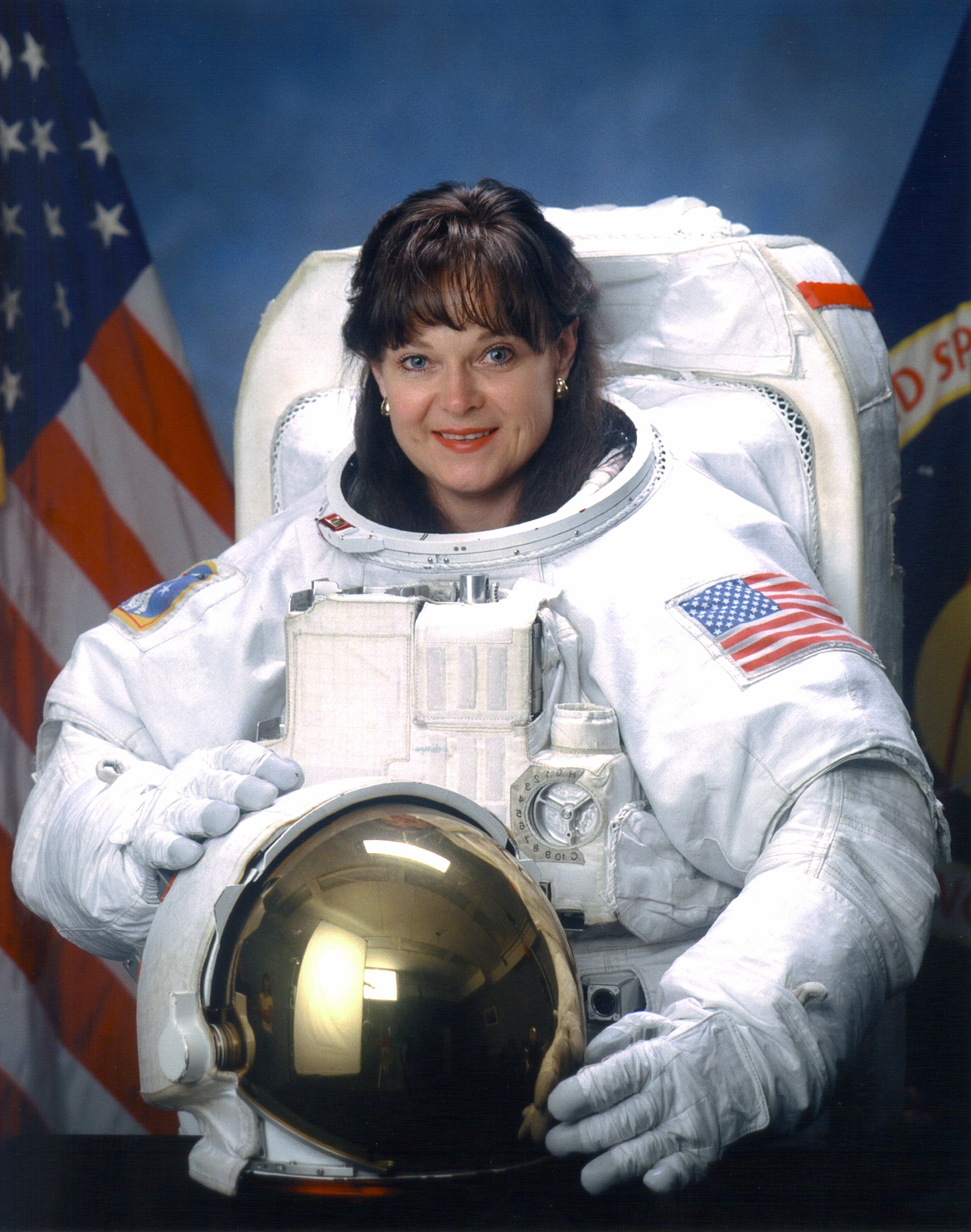
- Jernigan in 1999
- Born: Tamara Elizabeth Jernigan; May 7, 1959 (age 67); Chattanooga, Tennessee, U.S.
- Education: Stanford University (BS, MS); University of California, Berkeley (MS); Rice University (PhD)
- Space career

NASA astronaut
- Time in space: 63d 1h 24m
- Selection: NASA Group 11 (1985)
- Total EVAs: 1
- Total EVA time: 7h 55m
- Missions: STS-40; STS-52; STS-67; STS-80; STS-96
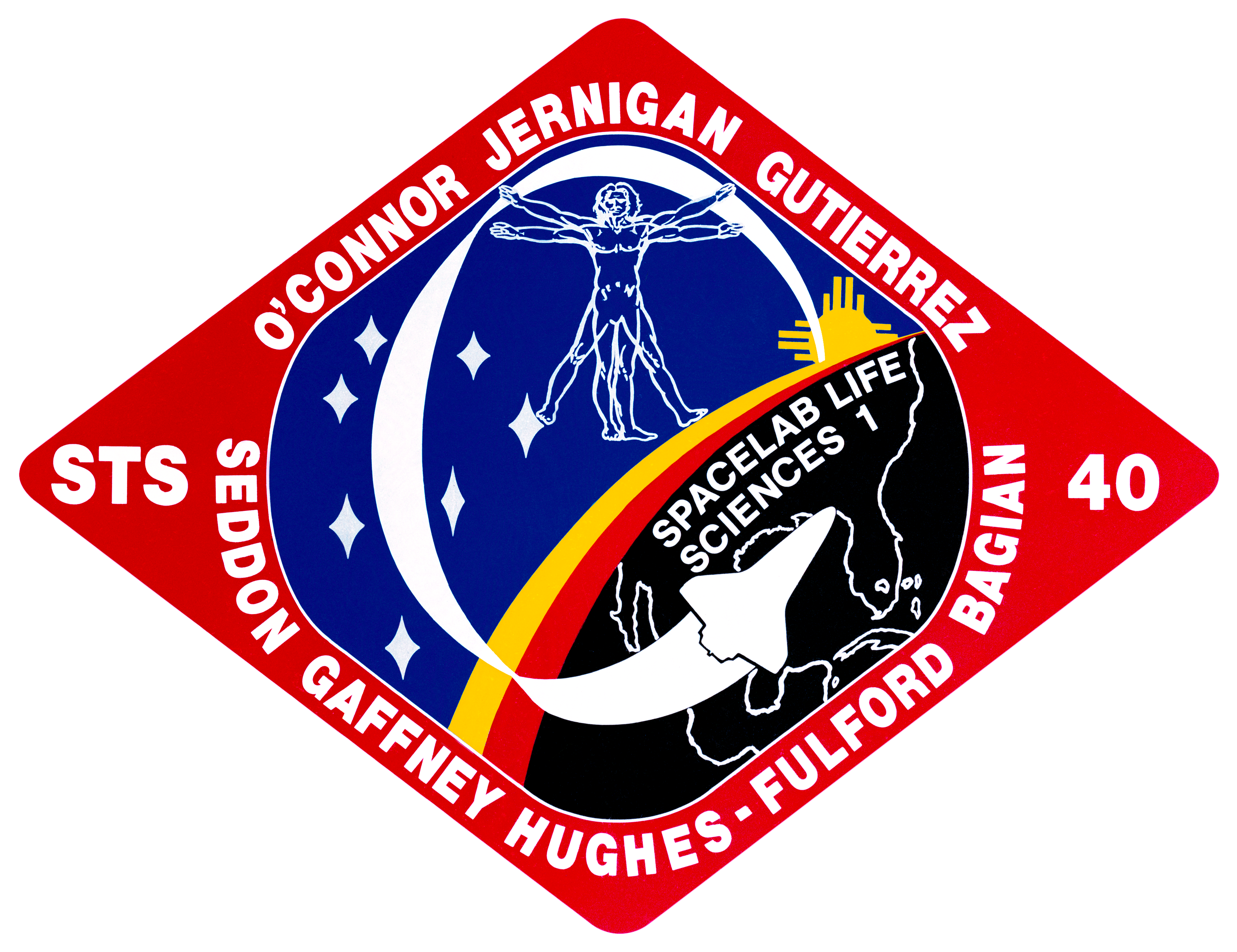
- Mission insignia
- Retired: 2001

Tamara Elizabeth Jernigan (born May 7, 1959) is an American astrophysicist and former NASA astronaut. During her career she completed five Space Shuttle program missions (three on Columbia and one each on Endeavour and Discovery), logging over 1512 hours in space. Jernigan left NASA in 2001, and is Deputy Principal Associate Director in the Weapons and Complex Integration (WCI) organization at Lawrence Livermore National Laboratory.

== Early life and education ==
Tamara Elizabeth Jernigan was born on May 7, 1959, in Chattanooga, Tennessee, to Mary and Terry Jernigan. She attended Santa Fe High School in Santa Fe Springs, California, graduating in 1977. Jernigan attended Stanford University, where she played varsity volleyball. She earned a B.S. degree in physics in 1981 and an M.S. in engineering science in 1983. At the University of California, Berkeley, she received an M.S. in astronomy in 1985. In 1989, she was awarded a Ph.D. in space physics and astronomy from Rice University. She wrote her doctoral dissertation on "a plasma diagnostic study of two wind-blown shell nebulae: NGC 7635 and NGC 2359", under the supervision of Reginald Dufour. Her research focused on the modeling of "a high-velocity outflows in regions of star formation, gamma-ray bursters, and the radiation produced by interstellar shock waves".

== NASA career ==
Jernigan, under the supervision of Reginald Dufour, began working for NASA in June 1981 at the Ames Research Center while earning her degrees at Stanford and Berkeley. She worked in the Theoretical Studies Branch as a research scientist until June 1985 when she was among the 13 people selected as astronaut candidates.

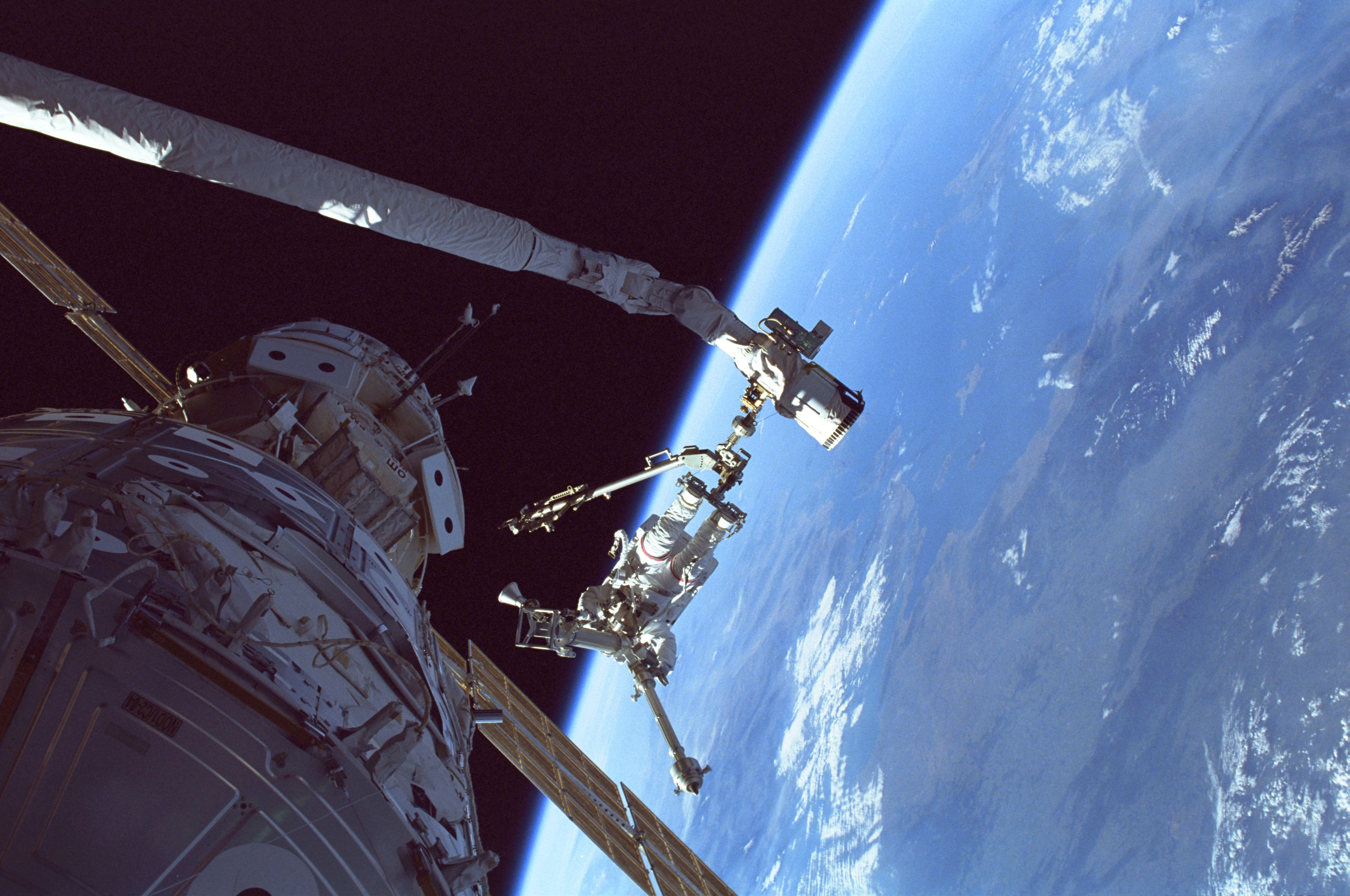
Tamara Jernigan performing EVA during STS-96

She entered the NASA Astronaut Corps in July 1986. Her first trip to space was on June 5, 1991. She flew on five Space Shuttle program missions (three on Columbia and one each on Endeavour and Discovery) and logged over 1512 hours in space. In her last mission on Discovery in 1999, she performed an extra-vehicular activity for 7 hours and 55.5 minutes.

Jernigan has served as Deputy Chief of the Astronaut Office, assisting with the management of both military and civilian astronauts and support personnel and as Deputy for the Space Station program where she developed and advocated Astronaut Office positions on the design and operation of the International Space Station. She also represented NASA management on the U.S. negotiating team in Moscow during technical interchange meetings designed to resolve crew training, crew rotation, and operational issues.

Jernigan retired from NASA in 2001 and currently serves as Deputy Principal Associate Director in the Weapons and Complex Integration (WCI) organization at Lawrence Livermore National Laboratory.

== Awards ==
Jernigan is the recipient of the NASA Distinguished Service Medal and the NASA Outstanding Leadership Medal.

== Personal ==
She currently resides in Pleasanton, California. She is married to former astronaut Peter Wisoff and has two children, Jeffrey Wisoff and Michael Wisoff. Tamara and Jeff have retired from Lawrence Livermore since.
