= Federated digital thread =

Architectural approach to distributed lifecycle data integration

A federated digital thread, also called an integrated digital thread, is a design method used in modern manufacturing and digital engineering to organize and connect end-to-end data across multiple systems without requiring a single central database. It links data across different tools and organizations while allowing each system to remain independent.

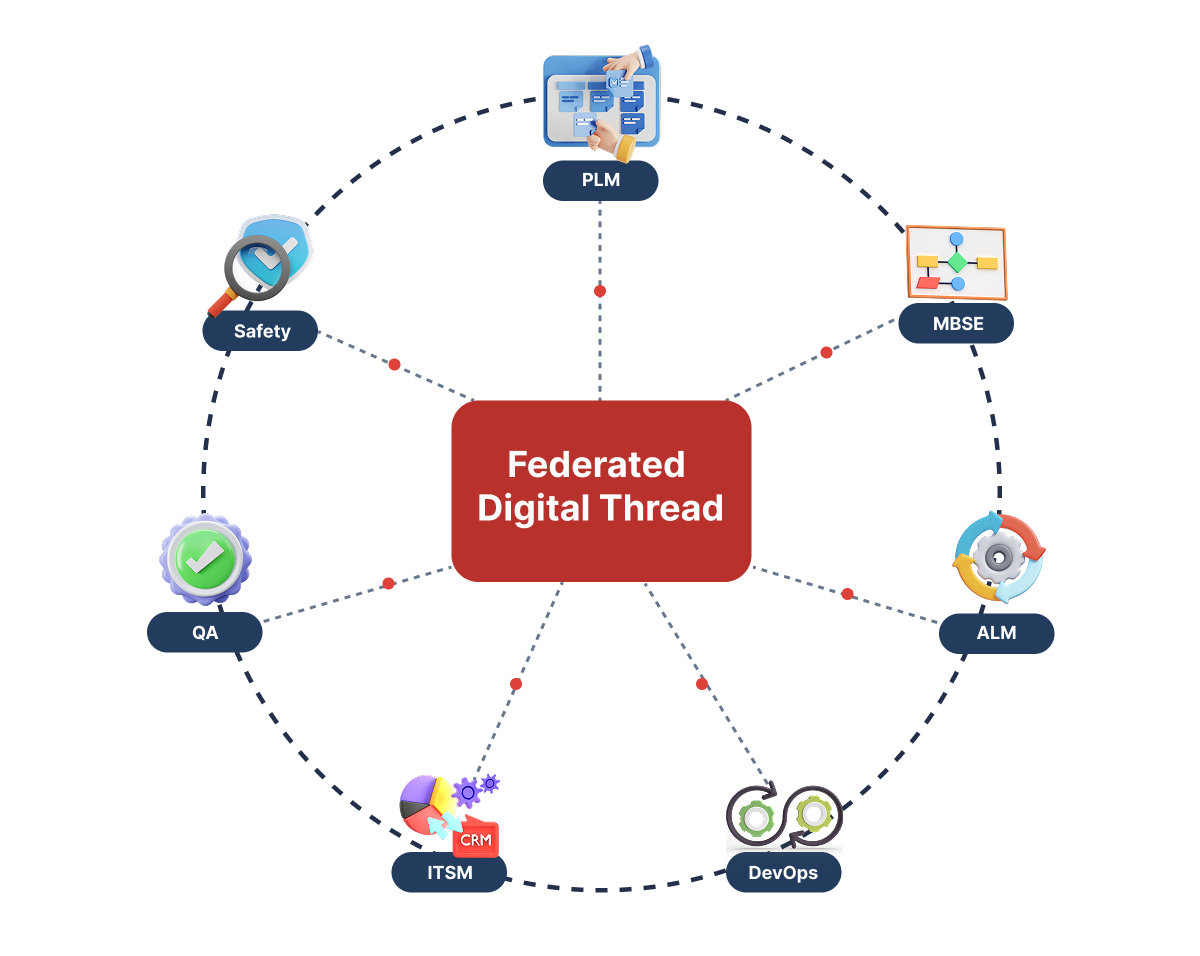

A standard digital thread usually connects data within one organization. A federated digital thread, by contrast, links information across different organizations, such as suppliers, manufacturers, vendors, and others. A federated digital thread can also be used within a single organization to connect groups who do not share a common, single 'source of truth' - such as customer support, engineering, quality assurance, line of business owners and executives. In a federated model, these groups do not share one central database but use common communication rules to exchange details. The federated framework allows each participant to maintain strict control and security over their own data while still contributing to a shared, complete record of a product.

Making this work often depends on technologies such as linked data and graph-based relationships, which enable seamless communication between systems. Unlike centralized data architectures, a federated approach enables integration without requiring consolidation into a single repository.

== Background and evolution ==
The need for connected lifecycle data grew in the early 2000s, particularly in aerospace and defense sectors that manage complex systems and large volumes of engineering data. A digital thread enables a continuous information flow across design, manufacturing, and operational stages.

Earlier approaches focused on consolidating data into centralized systems to create a “single source of truth.” However, as projects expanded to include global partners, this model became difficult to manage due to differences in tools, data formats, and security requirements.

Government initiatives such as the United States Department of Defense DoDI 5000.97, which described their Digital Engineering Strategy, emphasize the use of authoritative data across lifecycle stages, reinforcing the need for connected but controlled data environments.

Over time, research and industry practices shifted toward federated approaches, where integration is achieved by connecting existing systems rather than replacing them. Studies on federated product lifecycle management architectures highlight that such approaches can reduce integration complexity and improve scalability compared to centralized systems.

== Key concepts and maturity levels ==
Organizations typically progress through different stages of digital maturity.

The first stage is digitization, which converts physical records into digital formats such as scanned documents.

The second stage, digitalization, introduces specialized software systems across departments, although these systems often operate independently and require manual data exchange.

The third stage is a digital thread, where systems are connected through integrations that enable data flow across lifecycle stages. However, research shows that these integrations are often limited and may not preserve full context or relationships across lifecycle data.

Implementing a digital thread is more complex than simply storing data digitally. It is an advanced capability that organizations build by moving through several stages of digital maturity.

A fully developed federated digital thread represents a more advanced stage, where lifecycle data remains distributed but is linked across systems. Research from the National Institute of Standards and Technology (NIST) highlights that lifecycle data is inherently heterogeneous and distributed, requiring approaches that support integration across multiple systems without centralization.

This approach enables organizations to maintain their existing tools while still providing a unified view of product lifecycle information.

== Applications in industry ==
Highly regulated industries such as aerospace, defense, and medical device manufacturing rely on integrated lifecycle data to manage complex products over long periods. These sectors require traceability, compliance, and the ability to maintain digital records across decades.

A federated approach supports these requirements by ensuring that lifecycle data remains accessible even when systems change or organizations evolve. It also allows suppliers and subcontractors to retain control over their intellectual property, since data remains within their own systems while only relevant information is shared.

In addition, digital thread implementations have been shown to support improved traceability, quality management, and operational decision-making in manufacturing environments.

== Related concepts ==
The federated digital thread is closely related to the concept of a digital twin, but the two serve different purposes. A digital twin is a virtual representation of a specific physical asset that reflects its current state. The digital thread provides data connections that enable information to flow across lifecycle stages and support the digital twin.

Standards such as Open Services for Lifecycle Collaboration (OSLC) provide mechanisms for linking data across systems, supporting federated integration without requiring data centralization.
