= Digital thread =

Data-driven architecture

Digital thread, also known as digital chain, is defined as “the use of digital tools and representations for design, evaluation, and life cycle management.”. It is a data-driven architecture that links data gathered during a Product lifecycle from all involved and distributed manufacturing systems. This data can come from any part of product's lifecycle, its transportation, or its supply chain. Digital thread "enables the collection, transmission, and sharing of data and information between systems across the product lifecycle" to enable real-time decision making, gather data, and iterate on the product.

A digital thread is often used in industries such as aerospace, manufacturing and software engineering to connect data across different systems and stages of product's lifecycle. It helps in maintaining traceability, improve collaboration, and make more informed decisions by linking information across tools and teams.

The term 'digital thread' was first used in the Global Horizons 2013 report by the USAF Global Science and Technology Vision Task Force. Digital thread was further refined in 2018 by Singh and Willcox at MIT in their paper entitled "Engineering with a Digital Thread". In this academic paper the term digital thread is defined as "a data-driven architecture that links together information generated from across the product lifecycle and is envisioned to be the primary or authoritative data and communication platform for a company’s products at any instance of time."

Digital thread enables "data to be integrated into one platform, allowing seamless use of and ease of access to all data".

Digital threads where the data is not collected into a central repository but kept in the systems of origin and integrated using APIs are called Federated digital threads.

== Applications ==
=== Digital twin ===
Idaho National Laboratories describes Digital Twin as "the merging of integrated and connected data, sensors and instrumentation, artificial intelligence, and online monitoring into a single cohesive unit."

It is a critical capability of model-based systems engineering (MBSE) and the foundation for a Digital twin, which is defined as "a digital replica of a physical entity". In fact, digital thread was first described as related to Digital twin in the Global Horizons 2013 report. Digital thread is a means to gather data for use in the development of a Digital twin; "some argue [digital thread] is the backbone of digital twin applications". "digital thread platforms can capture data from different systems, standardize it, and provide a seamless link between the physical process or product and the digital twin". The term digital thread is also used to describe the traceability of the digital twin back to the requirements, parts and control systems that make up the physical asset.

Although digital thread and Digital twin are "every so often understood to be synonymous...they are not the same as Digital Twin relies on real-time data from its physical counterpart". "In short, digital thread describes the process while digital twin symbolizes technology". "Compared to the digital twin, the digital thread can support decision-making by designing and regulating the data interaction and processing instead of high-fidelity system models".

A digital thread enables a Digital twin by ensuring that incoming data is made uniform and easily accessible through the three main data chains:

1. The Product Innovation chain - Product designs, processes, and design flow are incorporated into the digital thread
2. The Enterprise Value chain - Supplier information, material data, and manufacturing processes are incorporated into the digital thread.
3. The Field and Service chain - Maintenance manuals and part availability are incorporated into the digital thread.

Enabling a Digital twin could result in petabytes of data, and "necessitate the use of highly sophisticated tools and software."

==== Tools ====
===== DeepLynx =====
"DeepLynx is an ontological data warehouse with timeseries data support". It was primarily authored by John Darrington and Cristopher Ritter to tackle Model-Based Systems Engineering (MBSE) tool integrations and warehousing, and has evolved to enable support for digital twin.

=== Internet of things ===
A key aspect of digital thread is the Internet of things, whose "cyber-physical systems, sensors, and so-called smart devices" are an important source of the data required by digital thread. "The ability to gather massive amounts of data through the aspired omnipresence of sensors furthermore fuels the emergence of other key technologies" such as Big data analytics, Artificial intelligence, and Cloud computing. "Thus, the data collected by using IoT technologies constitute the basis of advanced simulation models, which is in essence the livelihood of the digital twin paradigm and therefore also an integral part of the wider digital thread."

=== Smart manufacturing ===
Big data analytics and artificial intelligence used in conjunction with Digital Thread are increasingly more required in smart manufacturing applications. Big data analytics is a "prerequisite for managing highly variable" data of smart manufacturing processes, gathered through the digital thread. Artificial Intelligence can be trained using this data to create "autonomously self-improving production processes [14] and to facilitate organizational decision-making". "the digital thread paradigm not only leads to the accumulation and processing of massive amounts of data but is also shaped by the analytical results these both technologies provide".

== Related technologies ==
- Digital Twin
- Federated digital thread
- Centralized digital thread
- Internet of Things
- Product Lifecycle
