= Wind turbine prognostics =

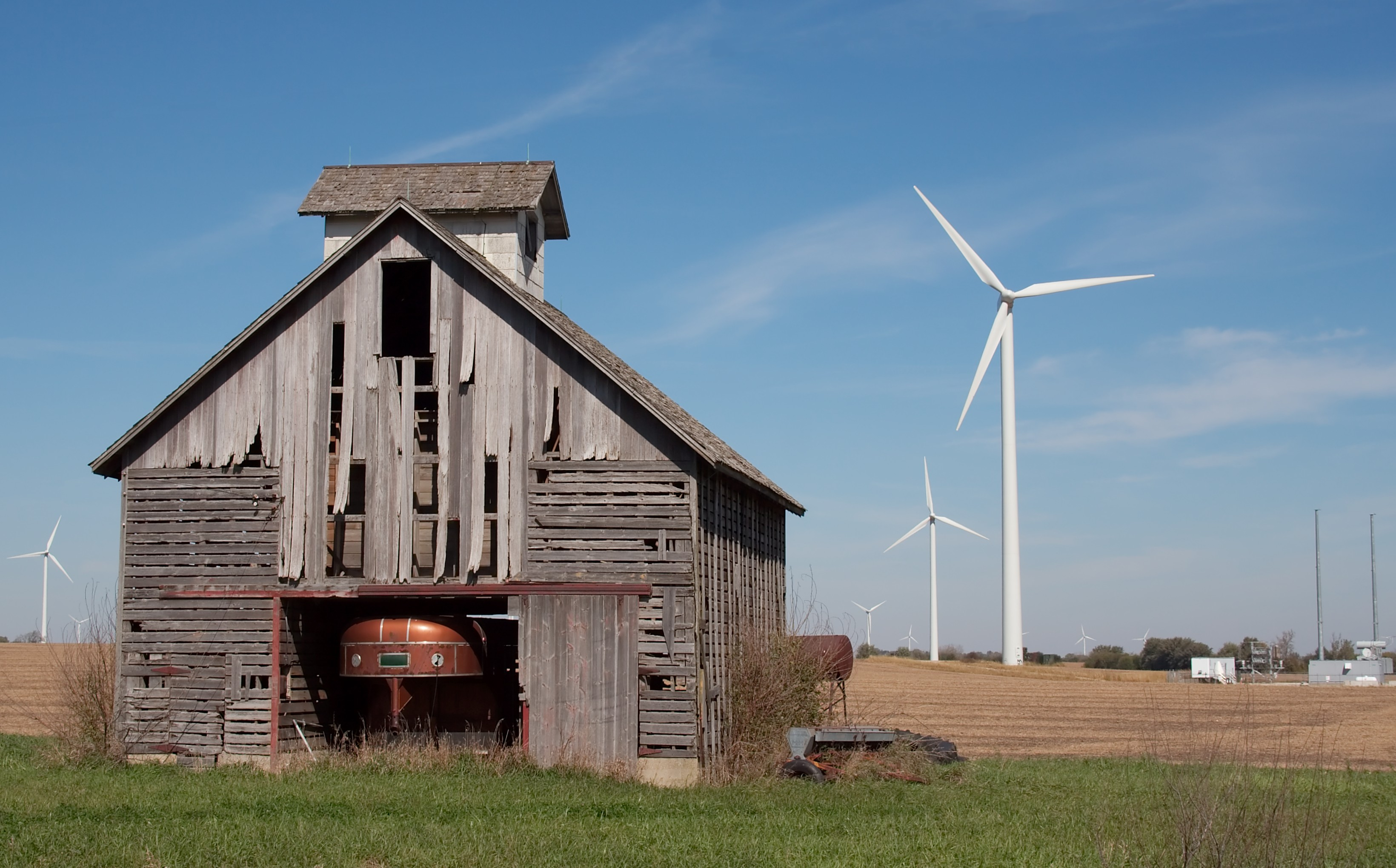
Early small scale onshore Wind Turbines

The growing demand for renewable energy has resulted in global adoption and rapid expansion of wind turbine technology. Wind turbines are typically designed to reach a 20-year life, however, due to the complex loading and environment in which they operate wind turbines rarely operate to that age without significant repairs and extensive maintenance during that period. In order to improve the management of wind farms there is an increasing move towards preventative maintenance as opposed to scheduled and reactive maintenance to reduce downtime and lost production. This is achieved through the use of prognostic monitoring/management systems.

Typical Wind Turbine architecture consists of a variety of complex systems such as multi-stage planetary gear boxes, hydraulic systems and a variety of other electro-mechanical drives. Due to the scale of some mechanical systems and the remoteness of some sites, wind turbine repairs can be prohibitively expensive and difficult to co-ordinate, resulting in long periods of downtime and lost production.

As typical wind turbine capacity is expected to reach over 15MW in the coming years combined with the inaccessibility of Offshore wind farms, the use of prognostic methods is expected to become even more prevalent within the industry.

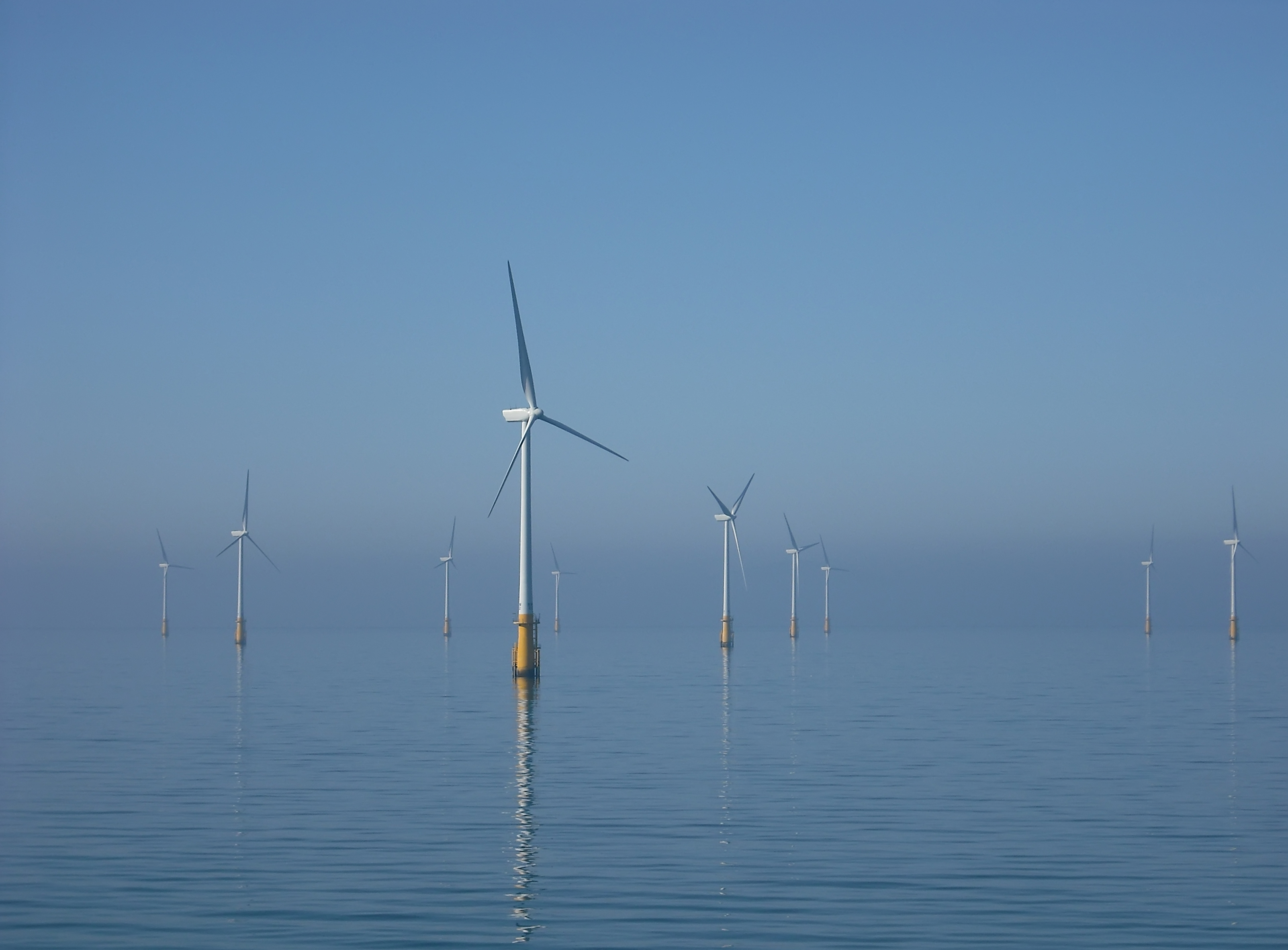
Modern Large Scale Offshore Wind Farm

Wind Turbine prognostics is also referred to as Asset Health Management, Condition Monitoring or Condition Management.

== History ==
Early small-scale wind turbines were relatively simple and typically fitted with minimal instrumentation required to control the turbine. There was little design focus on ensuring long-term operation for the relatively infantile technology. The main faults resulting in turbine downtime are typically drive train or pitch system related.

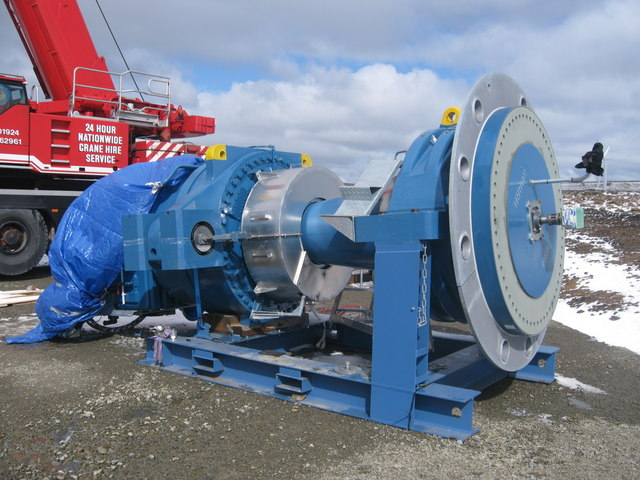
Wind Turbine Gearbox Replacement

There has been a rapid development of wind turbine technology. As turbines have grown in capacity, complexity and cost, there have been significant improvements in the sophistication of instrumentation installed on wind turbines which has enabled more effective prognostic systems on newer wind turbines. In response, there has been a growing trend of retro-fitting similar systems on existing wind turbines in order to manage aging assets effectively.

Prognostic methods that enable preventative maintenance have been common place in some industries for decades such as Aerospace and other industrial applications. As the cost of repairing wind turbines has increased as designs have grown more complex it is expected that the Wind Turbine industry will adopt a number of prognostic methods and economic models from these industries such a power-by-the-hour approach to ensure availability.

== Failure Modes ==
Turbine failures, particularly mechanical failures, cause significant downtime for repairs. Additionally, turbines are most often built in remote areas or offshore locations, where maintenance is a logistical and financial challenge. Analysis and mitigation of turbine failure is essential to improve the cost and reliability of wind energy. The components responsible for the most downtime per repair are typically the turbine blades and components of the drivetrain.

=== Turbine Blades ===
Wind turbine blades withstand consistently high centripetal loads throughout their life and must endure high exposure to their surroundings. Rotor blades can experience surface weathering at the leading and trailing edges due to windborne dust and debris, which deteriorates the blade material and affects the turbine’s efficiency. While detrimental if left unchecked, this deterioration is also easy to monitor and repair before serious damage is incurred. More damaging are interior structural cracks caused by invisible defects in the material which propagate under high stresses, and connection faults at the root which can cause blade separation. The blades are also susceptible to lightning damage, which is particularly harmful for blades made of carbon-fiber reinforced polymer, due to the mechanical stresses caused by inductive heating from eddy currents.

=== Drivetrain ===
Tasked with converting the low-speed rotation of the massive blades into rotation in the thousands of rpm, the drivetrain of a wind turbine experiences some of the most extreme loads of any component, most notably in the bearings, which support the mechanical load of the system. The primary cause of roller bearing failure in turbines is the high contact stress involved, manifesting as abrasive wear, micro pitting, scuffing, and macropitting issues. Wind turbines also experience widely varying operating conditions like dynamic wind load, varying speed, and impact, which can push bearings beyond their limits, accelerating their failure. Wind turbine bearings also frequently exhibit white etching cracks, a kind of localized damage to the ferrite microstructure of steel. The exact cause of this process is unknown, but it is responsible for a large portion of drivetrain bearing failures.

== Data Capture ==
The methods for wind turbine prognostics can broadly be grouped into two categories:

- SCADA based
- Vibration based

Most wind turbines are fitted with a range of instrumentation by the manufacturer. However this is typically limited to parameters required for turbine operation, environmental conditions and drivetrain temperatures. This SCADA based turbine prognostics approach is the most economical approach for more rudimentary wind turbine designs.

For more complex designs, with complex drivetrain and lubrication systems, a number of studies have demonstrated the value of Vibration monitoring and Oil monitoring prognostic systems. These are now widely commercially available.

Traditional content management systems (CMS) typically rely on piezoelectric vibration sensors for gearbox monitoring tasks. While these sensors are capable of capturing adequate data, they fall short when it comes to detecting low-frequency phenomena, such as rotor imbalance. This is where Micro-Electro-Mechanical Systems (MEMS) sensors provide more detail, as they have the ability to measure frequencies all the way down to 0 Hz (also referred to as DC offset). This capability enables these advanced sensors to identify critical frequencies related to the input shaft ('1P') and blade passing ('3P'), both of which often fall below 1 Hz and remain undetected by traditional CMS technologies.

Leveraging cutting-edge technology, this advanced monitoring solution excels in tracking vibration trends, including those caused by ice formation on turbine blades. When a rotor experiences imbalance, the system is designed to note any increase in the 1P rotor frequency. Mass imbalance can arise from a variety of issues, such as the non-uniform build-up of dirt or ice, the presence of moisture, or damage. Additionally, aerodynamic imbalance may occur due to inaccuracies within individual blade profiles, physical damage, or errors in pitch calibration.

== Data Analysis ==
Once data is collected by on board data acquisition systems, this is typically processed and communicated to ground based or cloud based data storage system.

Raw parameters and derived health indicators are typically trended over time. Due to the nature of drivetrain faults, these are typically analysed in the frequency domain in order to diagnose faults.

GHE can be generated from a wind turbine SCADA (Supervisory Control and Data Acquisition) system, by interpreting turbine performance as its capability to generate power under dynamic environmental conditions. Wind speed, wind direction, pitch angle, and other parameters are first selected as input. Then two key parameters in characterizing wind power generation, wind speed and actual power output, collected while turbine is known to work under nominal healthy condition are used to establish a baseline model. When real-time data arrives, same parameters are used to model current performance. GHE is obtained by computing the distance between the new data and its baseline model.

By trending the GHE over time, performance prediction can be made when unit revenue will drop below a predetermined break-even threshold. Maintenance should be triggered and directed to components with low LDE values. LDE is computed based on measurements from condition monitoring system (CMS) and SCADA, and is used to locate and diagnose incipient failure at component level.

Machine learning is also used by collecting and analyzing massive amounts of data, such as vibration, temperature, power and others from thousands of wind turbines several times per second to predict and prevent failures.

== See also ==
- Decision support system
- Prognostics
