= Digital twin integration level =

The digital twin integration level refers to the different degrees of data and information flow that may occur between the physical part and the digital copy of a digital twin. According to the different levels of integration, the digital twin can be divided into three subcategories: Digital Model (DM), Digital Shadow (DS) and Digital Twin (DT).

== Digital twin definitions ==
The concept of digital twin is now increasingly widespread and it is one of the greatest examples of digital transformation not only in the manufacturing sector but also in the construction, healthcare and automotive area.

Digital twin definitions vary and take on different shades depending on the analyzed context. Although the literature provides a common view of the digital twin as a digital copy of a physical element, several definitions lead the concept of digital twin to be subjected to different interpretations and misconceptions. For example, some authors use the concept of Digital Models (e.g., 3D models) and digital twin indistinctly considering them as interchangeable. However, a significant difference between digital twin and digital 3D models and systems exists and can be outlined based on different level of data integration and information exchange.

== Level of integration ==
Data are among the most significant elements of a digital twin. Following the approach of Michael Grieves, the digital twin concept model is composed by three main parts: physical object, virtual or digital object and data that provide the connection between the physical and the digital. The physical collects and stores real time data that are sent to digital copy for processing. Vice versa, the digital applies its imbedded engineering models and AI subjecting data to transformations and processing information.

Depending on the different degree of data integration, a classification of the digital twin into three subcategories was proposed:

- Digital Model (DM),
- Digital Shadow (DS),
- Digital Twin (DT).

The digital twin is characterised by a bi-directional data flow between the digital and the physical. If digital representations do not enable bi-directional automatic data exchange, are modelled manually and have not a direct connection with the physical object, these cannot be a digital twin but rather a digital model or a digital shadow.

Data integration in Digital Model, Digital Shadow and Digital Twin
	Data flow from physical object to digital object	Data flow from digital object to physical object
Digital Model	Manual	Manual
Digital Shadow	Automatic	Manual
Digital Twin	Automatic	Automatic

=== Digital Model ===
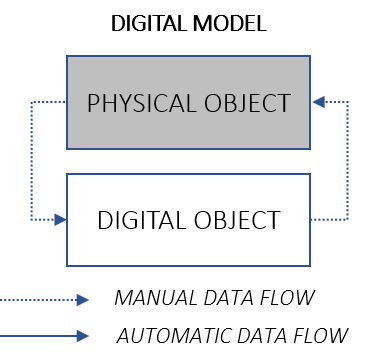
Data Flow in a Digital Model based on Kritzinger et al.

A digital model has the lowest level of data integration. The term indicates a digital representation of an existing and physical object characterised by the absence of automated data flow between the physical and digital object. This suggests that the data flow from a physical object to a digital object and vice versa is provided manually. Consequently, any change occurred in the physical element does not impact the digital element and at the same way any modification of the digital element does not affect the physical element.

A digital model ranges from the simple building component to the whole building considering the construction sector. In this case, it is used to represent and describe digitally a concept, to compare different options avoiding the application in the physical. In addition, the term refers to simulation models of planned factories or mathematical models of new products.

=== Digital Shadow ===
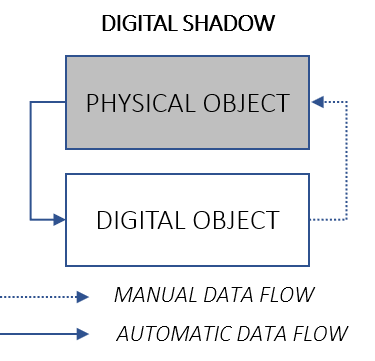
Data Flow in a Digital Shadow based on Kritzinger et al.

Starting from the concept of digital model, if there is an automated data flow from the physical element to the digital element the digital, representation takes the name of digital shadow. Hence, a change in the physical object contributes to a change in the digital object but not vice versa. According to a study carried out, most of digital twin research articles in the manufacturing area stops at the digital shadow level of integration.

The term digital shadow can be associated to the building information modeling concept in the construction sector. It can be characterised and enriched by simulations but their output is not associated to automatic modifications in the building.

=== Digital Twin ===
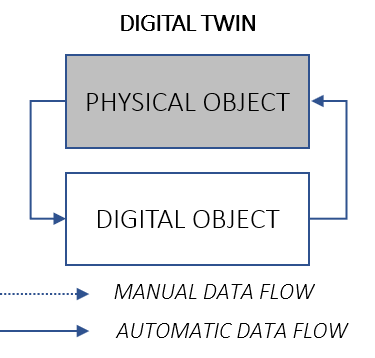
Data Flow in a Digital Twin based on Kritzinger et al.

The highest level of integration is reserved to a digital twin. The data flow is automatic in both directions between the physical and digital object. In this context, a modification in the state of a physical object determines a modification in the state of a digital object and vice versa.

Unlike the digital shadow, the digital twin enables to verify physical processes and activities prior the execution to reduce failures and it can outline differences between the actual and simulated performances to optimise and predict the behaviour. Furthermore, since data within the digital twin are derived not only from the physical environment but also from virtual models with data elaborated through processes such as statistics and regression, the digital twin is more abundant in data than the digital shadow.

== Examples ==
Applying the concept of digital twin to the construction environment, a building digital twin is not limited to its 3D visual modeling, that is called digital model or digital shadow according to the degree of data integration. It can become a digital twin if it has automated or semi-automated thermal management control, or the procurement of construction site components with physical delivery and sensor devices by the use of satellites, or by optimising and scheduling the renovation or construction processes using connected on-site smart devices.

== See also ==
- Building Information Model (BIM)
- Internet of Things (IoT)
- Industry 4.0
- Digitalisation
