= Integrated vehicle health management =

Vehicle monitoring system

Integrated vehicle health management (IVHM) or integrated system health management (ISHM) is the unified capability of systems to assess the current or future state of the member system health and integrate that picture of system health within a framework of available resources and operational demand.

== Aims of IVHM ==
The aims of IVHM are to enable better management of vehicle and vehicle fleet health.

- Improve safety through use of diagnostics and prognostics to fix faults before they are an issue.
- Improve availability through better maintenance scheduling
- Improve reliability through a more thorough understanding of the current health of the system and prognosis based maintenance
- Reduce total cost of maintenance through reduction of unnecessary maintenance and avoidance of unscheduled maintenance

This is achieved through correct use of reliable sensing and prognosis systems to monitor part health and also using usage data to assist in understanding the load experienced and likely future vehicle load.

== History ==
=== Origins ===
It has been suggested that IVHM as a named concept has been around since the 1970s. However, there does not seem to be much in the way of written evidence of this. IVHM as a concept grew out of popular aviation maintenance methods. It was a natural next step from condition based maintenance. As sensors improved and our understanding of the systems concerned grew, it became possible to not just detect failure but also to predict it. The high unit cost & high maintenance cost of aircraft & spacecraft made any advance in maintenance methods very attractive. NASA was one of the first organisations to use the name IVHM to describe how they wanted to approach maintenance of spacecraft in the future. They created NASA-CR-192656, in 1992 with the assistance of the General Research Corporation and the Orbital Technologies Corporation. This was a goals & objectives document in which they discussed the technology and maintenance concepts that they believed would be necessary to enhance safety while reducing maintenance costs in their next generation vehicles. Many companies since then have become interested in IVHM and body of literature has increased substantially. There are now IVHM solutions for many different types of vehicle from the JSF to commercial haulage vehicles.

=== First space prognostics ===
The first published history of predicting spacecraft equipment failures occurred on the 12 Rockwell/U.S. Air Force Global Positioning System Block I (Phase 1) satellites using non-repeatable transient events (NRTE) and GPS Kalman filter data from the GPS Master Control Station, between 1978 and 1984 by the GPS Space and Ground Segment Manager. NRTEs were isolated to the GPS satellites after mission operations support personnel replayed the real-time satellite telemetry ruling out RF and land-line noise caused from poor Eb/No or S/N and data acquisition and display system processing problems. The GPS satellite's subsystem equipment vendors diagnosed the NRTEs as systemic noise that preceded the equipment failures because at the time, it was believed that all equipment failures occurred instantaneously and randomly and so equipment failures could not be predicted (e.g. equipment failures exhibited memoryless behavior). Rockwell International GPS Systems Engineering Manager ordered a stop to predicting GPS satellite equipment failures in 1983 claiming it wasn't possible and the company was not on contract to do so. The prognostic analysis that was completed on the GPS satellite telemetry was published quarterly contractually as a CDRL to the GPS Program Office personnel and a wide variety of Air Force subcontractors working on the GPS program.

=== Further development ===
One of the key milestones in the creation of IVHM for aircraft was the series of ARINC standards that enabled different manufacturers to create equipment that would work together and be able to send diagnostic data from the aircraft to the maintenance organisation on the ground. ACARS is frequently used to communicate maintenance and operational data between the flight crew and the ground crew. This has led to concepts which have been adopted in IVHM.

Another milestone was the creation of health and usage monitoring systems(HUMS) for helicopters operating in support of the Oil rigs in the North Sea. This is key concept that usage data can be used to assist maintenance planning. FOQA or Flight Data systems are similar to HUMS as they monitor the vehicle usage. They are useful for IVHM in the same way as they allow the usage of the vehicle to be thoroughly understood which aids in the design of future vehicles. It also allows excessive loads and usage to be identified and corrected. For example, if an aircraft was experiencing frequent heavy landings the maintenance schedule for the undercarriage could be changed to ensure that they are not wearing too fast under the increased load. The load carried by the aircraft could be lessened in future or operators could be given additional training to improve the quality of the landings.

The growing nature of this field led Boeing to set up an IVHM centre with Cranfield University in 2008 to act as a world leading research hub. The IVHM centre has since then offered the world's first IVHM Msc course and hosts several PhD students researching the application of IVHM to different fields.

== Philosophy ==
This graphic depicts the information flow within the IVHM concept as described by Professor Ian Jennions et al. of the IVHM Centre, Cranfield University. This graphic also appears in a similar form in the 2011 IVHM book.

IVHM is concerned not just with the current condition of the vehicle but also with health across its whole life cycle. IVHM examines the vehicle health against the vehicle usage data and within the context of similar information for other vehicles within the fleet. In use vehicles display unique usage characteristics and also some characteristics common across the fleet. Where usage data and system health data is available these can be analysed to identify these characteristics. This is useful in the Identification of problems unique to one vehicle as well as identifying trends in vehicle degradation across the entire fleet.

IVHM is a concept for the complete maintenance life cycle of a vehicle (or machine plant installation). It makes extensive use of embedded sensors and self-monitoring equipment combined with prognostics and diagnostic reasoning. In the case of vehicles it is typical for there to be a data acquisition module on-board and a diagnostic unit. Some vehicles can transfer selected data back to base while in use through various rf systems. Whenever the vehicle is at base the data is also transferred to a set of maintenance computers that also process that data for a deeper understanding of the true health of the vehicle. The usage of the vehicle can also be matched to the degradation of parts and improve the prognostics prediction accuracy.

The remaining useful life is used to plan replacement or repair of the part at some convenient time prior to failure. The inconvenience of taking the vehicle out of service is balanced against the cost of unscheduled maintenance to ensure that the part is replaced at the optimum point prior to failure. This process has been compared to the process of choosing when to buy financial options as the cost of scheduled maintenance must be balanced against the risk of failure and the cost of unscheduled maintenance.

This differs from Condition-based maintenance(CBM) where the part is replaced once it has failed or once a threshold is passed. This often involves taking the vehicle out of service with at an inconvenient time when it could be generating revenue. It is preferable to use an IVHM approach to replace it at the most convenient time. This allows the reduction in waste component life caused by replacing the part too early and also reducing cost incurred by unscheduled maintenance. This is possible due to the increased prognostic distance provided by an IVHM solution. There are many technologies that are used in IVHM. The field itself is still growing and many techniques are still being added to the body of knowledge.

== Architecture ==
Health monitoring sensors are designed into the vehicle and report to a data processing unit. Some of the data may be manipulated on board for immediate system diagnosis and prognosis. Less time critical data is processed off board. All the historical data for the vehicle can be compared with current performance to identify degradation trends at a more detailed level than could be done on board the vehicle. This is all used to improve reliability and availability and the data is also fed back to the manufacturer for them to improve their product.

A standard architecture for IVHM has been proposed as the OSA-CBM standard which gives a structure for data gathering, analysis and action. This is intended to facilitate interoperability between IVHM systems of different suppliers. The key parts within OSA-CBM are

- Data acquisition (DA)
- Data manipulation (DM)
- State detection (SD)
- Health assessment (HA)
- Prognosis assessment (PA)
- Advisory generation (AG)

These are laid out within ISO 13374

The system is not intended to replace safety critical warnings such as an aircraft's flight management system but instead to complement them and perhaps also leverage existing sensors for assistance with system health monitoring. Ideal systems to monitor are those systems, subsystems & structural elements which are likely to show graceful degradation so that they can be repaired or replaced at a convenient time prior to failure. This gives a saving over condition based maintenance as once a part has failed often a vehicle cannot be used until repaired. This often results in scheduling difficulties if the vehicle fails when it was needed for revenue generation and cannot be used. In contrast IVHM can be used to replace the part during vehicle downtime prior to failure. This ensures that it can continue to generate revenue as scheduled.

Communications between the vehicle and the maintenance organisation are crucial to fixing faults in a timely manner. The balance of how much data should be sent to the maintainer during use and how much should be downloaded while in maintenance is a one that must be judged carefully. One example of this is what is known as fault forwarding. When an aircraft experiences a fault the flight management system reports it to the flight crew but also sends a message through ACARS to the maintenance team so that they can start their maintenance planning before the aircraft has landed. This yields a time advantage as they know some of the parts and personnel required to fix the fault before the aircraft has landed. However the communication link does cost money and has a limited bandwidth so the worth of this health & usage data must be judged carefully with consideration given as to whether it should be transmitted or merely downloaded during the next maintenance or as part of the operator shutdown process.

== See also ==
- Digital twin
- health and usage monitoring systems
