= Prognostics =

Engineering discipline

Prognostics is an engineering discipline focused on predicting the time at which a system or a component will no longer perform its intended function. This lack of performance is most often a failure beyond which the system can no longer be used to meet desired performance. The predicted time then becomes the remaining useful life (RUL), which is an important concept in decision making for contingency mitigation. Prognostics predicts the future performance of a component by assessing the extent of deviation or degradation of a system from its expected normal operating conditions. The science of prognostics is based on the analysis of failure modes, detection of early signs of wear and aging, and fault conditions. An effective prognostics solution is implemented when there is sound knowledge of the failure mechanisms that are likely to cause the degradations leading to eventual failures in the system. It is therefore necessary to have initial information on the possible failures (including the site, mode, cause and mechanism) in a product. Such knowledge is important to identify the system parameters that are to be monitored. Potential uses for prognostics is in condition-based maintenance. The discipline that links studies of failure mechanisms to system lifecycle management is often referred to as prognostics and health management (PHM), sometimes also system health management (SHM) or—in transportation applications—vehicle health management (VHM) or engine health management (EHM). Technical approaches to building models in prognostics can be categorized broadly into data-driven approaches, model-based approaches, and hybrid approaches.

== Data-driven prognostics ==
Data-driven prognostics usually use pattern recognition and machine learning techniques to detect changes in system states. The classical data-driven methods for nonlinear system prediction include the use of stochastic models such as the autoregressive (AR) model, the threshold AR model, the bilinear model, the projection pursuit, the multivariate adaptive regression splines, and the Volterra series expansion. Since the last decade, more interests in data-driven system state forecasting have been focused on the use of flexible models such as various types of neural networks (NNs) and neural fuzzy (NF) systems. Data-driven approaches are appropriate when the understanding of first principles of system operation is not comprehensive or when the system is sufficiently complex such that developing an accurate model is prohibitively expensive. Therefore, the principal advantages to data driven approaches is that they can often be deployed quicker and cheaper compared to other approaches, and that they can provide system-wide coverage (cf. physics-based models, which can be quite narrow in scope). The main disadvantage is that data driven approaches may have wider confidence intervals than other approaches and that they require a substantial amount of data for training. Data-driven approaches can be further subcategorized into fleet-based statistics and sensor-based conditioning. In addition, data-driven techniques also subsume cycle-counting techniques that may include domain knowledge.

The two basic data-driven strategies involve (1) modeling cumulative damage (or, equivalently, health) and then extrapolating out to a damage (or health) threshold, or (2) learning directly from data the remaining useful life. As mentioned, a principal bottleneck is the difficulty in obtaining run-to-failure data, in particular for new systems, since running systems to failure can be a lengthy and rather costly process. When future usage is not the same as in the past (as with most non-stationary systems), collecting data that includes all possible future usages (both load and environmental conditions) becomes often nearly impossible. Even where data exist, the efficacy of data-driven approaches is not only dependent on the quantity but also on the quality of system operational data. These data sources may include temperature, pressure, oil debris, currents, voltages, power, vibration and acoustic signal, spectrometric data as well as calibration and calorimetric data. The data often needs to be pre-processed before it can be used. Typically two procedures are performed i) Denoising and ii) Feature extraction. Denoising refers to reducing or eliminating the influence of noise on data. Features extraction is important because in today's data hungry world, a huge amount of data is collected using sensor measurement that may not be used readily. Therefore, domain knowledge and statistical signal processing is applied to extract important features from (more often than not) noisy, high-dimensional data.

== Physics-based prognostics ==
Physics-based prognostics (sometimes called model-based prognostics) attempts to incorporate physical understanding (physical models) of the system into the estimation of remaining useful life (RUL). Modeling physics can be accomplished at different levels, for example, micro and macro levels. At the micro level (also called material level), physical models are embodied by series of dynamic equations that define relationships, at a given time or load cycle, between damage (or degradation) of a system/component and environmental and operational conditions under which the system/component is operated. The micro-level models are often referred as damage propagation models. For example, Yu and Harris's fatigue life model for ball bearings, which relates the fatigue life of a bearing to the induced stress, Paris and Erdogan's crack growth model, and stochastic defect-propagation model are other examples of micro-level models. Since measurements of critical damage properties (such as stress or strain of a mechanical component) are rarely available, sensed system parameters have to be used to infer the stress/strain values. Micro-level models need to account in the uncertainty management for the assumptions and simplifications, which may pose significant limitations of that approach.

Macro-level models are the mathematical model at system level, which defines the relationship among system input variables, system state variables, and system measures variables/outputs where the model is often a somewhat simplified representation of the system, for example a lumped parameter model. The trade-off is increased coverage with possibly reducing accuracy of a particular degradation mode. Where this trade-off is permissible, faster prototyping may be the result. However, where systems are complex (e.g., a gas turbine engine), even a macro-level model may be a rather time-consuming and labor-intensive process. As a result, macro-level models may not be available in detail for all subsystems. The resulting simplifications need to be accounted for by the uncertainty management.

== Hybrid approaches ==
Hybrid approaches attempt to leverage the strength from both data-driven approaches as well as model-based approaches. In reality, it is rare that the fielded approaches are completely either purely data-driven or purely model-based. More often than not, model-based approaches include some aspects of data-driven approaches and data-driven approaches glean available information from models. An example for the former would be where model parameters are tuned using field data. An example for the latter is when the set-point, bias, or normalization factor for a data-driven approach is given by models. Hybrid approaches can be categorized broadly into two categories, 1) Pre-estimate fusion and 2) Post-estimate fusion. Physics-based and empirical models may be combined in a simple additive fashion as well, such as an additive combination of a basic physics-based model with an artificial neural network. This could deliver superior diagnostic or prognostic performance compared to just one or the other. See, for example, such an additive hybrid model employed in jet engine performance analysis.

=== Pre-estimate fusion of models and data ===
The motivation for pre-estimate aggregation may be that no ground truth data are available. This may occur in situations where diagnostics does a good job in detecting faults that are resolved (through maintenance) before system failure occurs. Therefore, there are hardly any run-to-failure data. However, there is incentive to know better when a system would fail to better leverage the remaining useful life while at the same time avoiding unscheduled maintenance (unscheduled maintenance is typically more costly than scheduled maintenance and results in system downtime). Garga et al. describe conceptually a pre-estimate aggregation hybrid approach where domain knowledge is used to change the structure of a neural network, thus resulting in a more parsimonious representation of the network. Another way to accomplish the pre-estimate aggregation is by a combined off-line process and on-line process: In the off-line mode, one can use a physics-based simulation model to understand the relationships of sensor response to fault state; In the on-line mode, one can use data to identify current damage state, then track the data to characterize damage propagation, and finally apply an individualized data-driven propagation model for remaining life prediction. For example, Khorasgani et al. modeled the physics of failure in electrolytic capacitors. Then, they used a particle filter approach to derive the dynamic form of the degradation model and estimate the current state of capacitor health. This model is then used to get more accurate estimation of the Remaining Useful Life (RUL) of the capacitors as they are subjected to thermal stress conditions.

=== Post-estimate fusion of model-based approaches with data-driven approaches ===
Motivation for post-estimate fusion is often a consideration of uncertainty management. That is, the post-estimate fusion helps to narrow the uncertainty intervals of data-driven or model-based approaches. At the same time, the accuracy improves. The underlying notion is that multiple information sources can help to improve performance of an estimator. This principle has been successfully applied within the context of classifier fusion, where the output of multiple classifiers is used to arrive at a better result than any classifier alone. Within the context of prognostics, fusion can be accomplished by employing quality assessments that are assigned to the individual estimators based on a variety of inputs, for example heuristics, a priori known performance, prediction horizon, or robustness of the prediction.

== Prognostic performance evaluation ==
Prognostic performance evaluation is of key importance for a successful PHM system deployment. The early lack of standardized methods for performance evaluation and benchmark data-sets resulted in reliance on conventional performance metrics borrowed from statistics. Those metrics were primarily accuracy and precision based, where performance is evaluated against end of life, typically known a priori in an offline setting. More recently, efforts towards maturing prognostics technology have put a significant focus on standardizing prognostic methods, including those of performance assessment. A key aspect, missing from the conventional metrics, is the capability to track performance with time. This is important because prognostics is a dynamic process where predictions get updated with an appropriate frequency as more observation data become available from an operational system. Similarly, the performance of prediction changes with time that must be tracked and quantified.

Another aspect that makes this process different in a PHM context is the time value of a RUL prediction. As a system approaches failure, the time window to take a corrective action gets shorter and consequently the accuracy of predictions becomes more critical for decision making. Finally, randomness and noise in the process, measurements, and prediction models are unavoidable and hence prognostics inevitably involves uncertainty in its estimates. A robust prognostics performance evaluation must incorporate the effects of this uncertainty.

Several prognostics performance metrics have evolved with consideration of these issues:

- Prognostic horizon (PH) quantifies how much in advance an algorithm can predict with a desired accuracy before a failure occurs. A longer prognostic horizon is preferred, as more time is then available for a corrective action.
- α-λ accuracy further tightens the desired accuracy levels using a shrinking cone of desired accuracy as end of life approaches. In order to comply with desired α-λ specifications at all times an algorithm must improve with time to stay within the cone.
- Relative accuracy quantifies the accuracy relative to the actual time remaining before failure.
- Convergence quantifies how fast the performance converges for an algorithm as end of life approaches.

A visual representation of these metrics can be used to depict prognostic performance over a long time horizon.

== Uncertainty in prognostics ==
There are many uncertainty parameters that can influence the prediction accuracy. These can be categorized as:

- Uncertainty in system parameters: this concerns the uncertainty in the values of the physical parameters of the system (resistance, inductance, stiffness, capacitance, etc.). This uncertainty is induced by the environmental and operational conditions where the system evolves. This can be tackled by using adequate methods such as interval ones.
- Uncertainty in nominal system model: this concerns the imprecisions in the mathematical models which are generated to represent the behavior of the system. These imprecisions (or uncertainties) can be the result of a set of assumptions used during the modeling process and which lead to models that don't fit exactly the real behavior of the system.
- Uncertainty in system degradation model: the degradation model can be obtained from accelerated life tests which are conducted on different data samples of a component. In practice, the data obtained by accelerated life tests performed under the same operating conditions may have different degradation trends. This difference in the degradation trends can then be considered as an uncertainty in the degradation models derived from the data related to the accelerated life tests.
- Uncertainty in prediction: uncertainty is inherent to any prediction process. Any nominal and/or degradation model predictions are inaccurate, which is impacted by several uncertainties, such as uncertainty in the model parameters, the environmental conditions and the future mission profiles. The prediction uncertainty can be tackled by using Bayesian and online estimation and prediction tools (e.g. Particle Filters and Kalman filter etc.).
- Uncertainty in failure thresholds: the failure threshold is important in any fault detection and prediction methods. It determines the time at which the system fails and consequently the remaining useful life. In practice, the value of the failure threshold is not constant and can change in time. It can also change according to the nature of the system, operating conditions and in the environment which it evolves. All these parameters induce uncertainty which should be considered in the definition of the failure threshold.

Examples of uncertainty quantification can be found in:

== Commercial hardware and software platforms ==
For most PHM industrial applications, commercial off the shelf data acquisition hardware and sensors are normally the most practical and common. Example commercial vendors for data acquisition hardware include National Instruments and Advantech Webaccess; however, for certain applications, the hardware can be customized or ruggedized as needed. Common sensor types for PHM applications include accelerometers, temperature, pressure, measurements of rotational speed using encoders or tachometers, electrical measurements of voltage and current, acoustic emission, load cells for force measurements, and displacement or position measurements. There are numerous sensor vendors for those measurement types, with some having a specific product line that is more suited for condition monitoring and PHM applications.

The data analysis algorithms and pattern recognition technology are now being offered in some commercial software platforms or as part of a packaged software solution. National Instruments currently has a trial version (with a commercial release in the upcoming year) of the Watchdog Agent prognostic toolkit, which is a collection of data-driven PHM algorithms that were developed by the Center for Intelligent Maintenance Systems. This collection of over 20 tools allows one to configure and customize the algorithms for signature extraction, anomaly detection, health assessment, failure diagnosis, and failure prediction for a given application as needed. Customized predictive monitoring commercial solutions using the Watchdog Agent toolkit are now being offered by a recent start-up company called Predictronics Corporation in which the founders were instrumental in the development and application of this PHM technology at the Center for Intelligent Maintenance Systems. Another example is MATLAB and its Predictive Maintenance Toolbox which provides functions and an interactive app for exploring, extracting, and ranking features using data-based and model-based techniques, including statistical, spectral, and time-series analysis. This toolbox also includes reference examples for motors, gearboxes, batteries, and other machines that can be reused for developing custom predictive maintenance and condition monitoring algorithms. Other commercial software offerings focus on a few tools for anomaly detection and fault diagnosis, and are typically offered as a package solution instead of a toolkit offering. Example includes Smart Signals anomaly detection analytical method, based on auto-associative type models (similarity based modeling) that look for changes in the nominal correlation relationship in the signals, calculates residuals between expected and actual performance, and then performs hypothesis testing on the residual signals (sequential probability ratio test). Similar types of analysis methods are also offered by Expert Microsystems, which uses a similar auto-associative kernel method for calculating residuals, and has other modules for diagnosis and prediction.

== System-level prognostics ==
While most prognostics approaches focus on accurate computation of the degradation rate and the remaining useful life (RUL) of individual components, it is the rate at which the performance of subsystems and systems degrade that is of greater interest to the operators and maintenance personnel of these systems.

== See also ==
- Futures studies
- Planned obsolescence
- Prediction
- Predictive maintenance
- Preventive maintenance
- Wind turbine prognostics
