= Story Musgrave =

American physician and astronaut (born 1935)

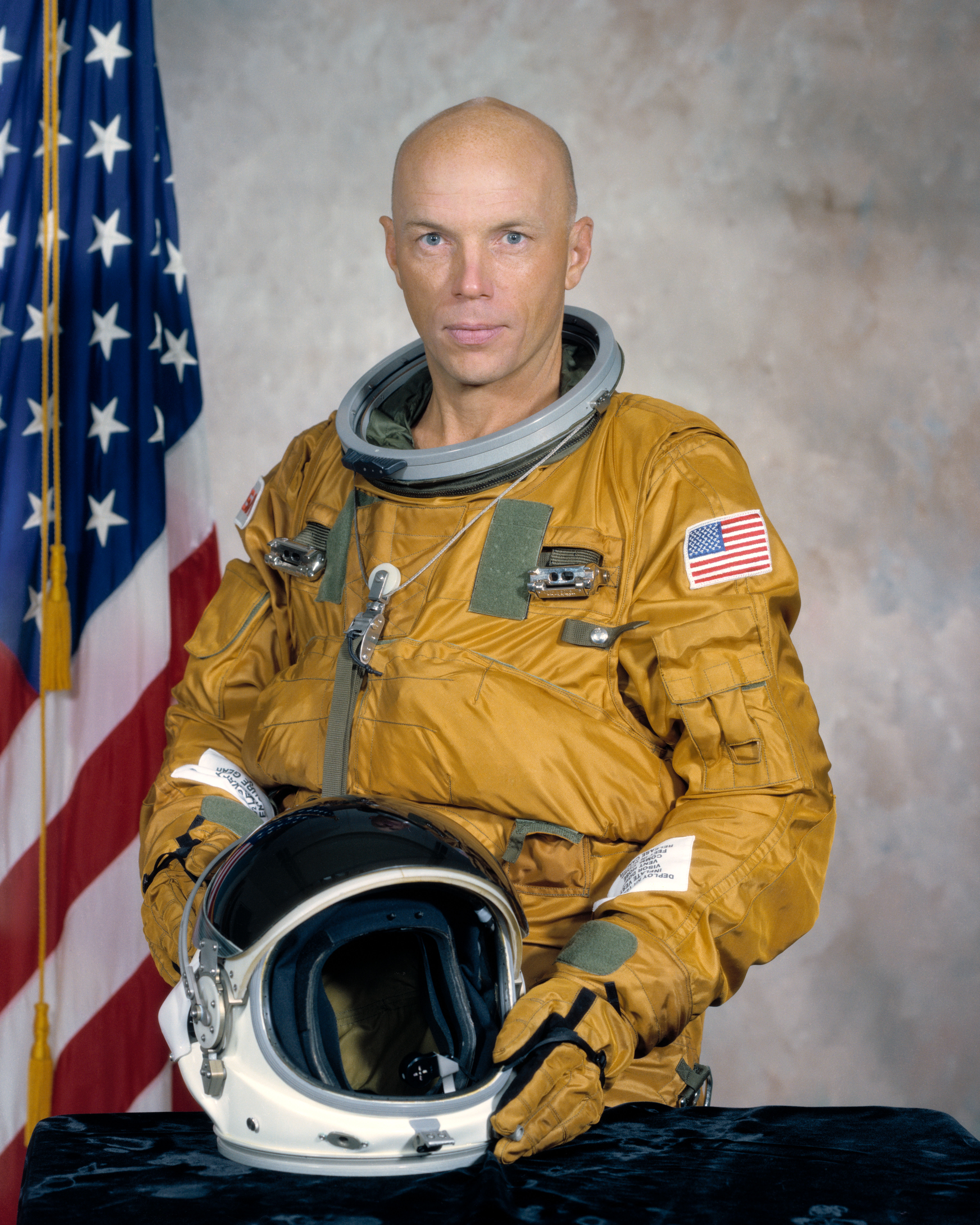
- Musgrave in 1979
- Born: Franklin Story Musgrave; August 19, 1935 (age 91); Boston, Massachusetts, U.S.
- Education: Syracuse University (BS); University of California, Los Angeles (MBA); Marietta College (BA); Columbia University (MD); University of Kentucky (MS); University of Houston (MA)
- Awards: NASA Distinguished Service Medal
- Space career

NASA astronaut
- Time in space: 53 days, 9 hours, 55 minutes
- Selection: NASA Group 6 (1967)
- Total EVAs: 4
- Total EVA time: 26 hours, 19 minutes
- Missions: STS-6; STS-51-F; STS-33; STS-44; STS-61; STS-80
- Retired: September 2, 1997

Franklin Story Musgrave (born August 19, 1935) is an American physician and a retired NASA astronaut. He is a public speaker and consultant to both Disney's Imagineering group and Applied Minds in California. In 1996, he became only the second astronaut to fly on six spaceflights, and he is the most formally educated astronaut with six academic degrees along with astronaut Lee Morin. Musgrave is the only astronaut to have flown aboard all five Space Shuttle orbiters.

== Early life ==
Musgrave was born August 19, 1935, the son of Percy Musgrave Jr. and Marguerite Warton Musgrave (née Swann). He grew up in Stockbridge, Massachusetts, but considers Lexington, Kentucky, to be his hometown.

Musgrave attended Dexter School in Brookline, Massachusetts, and St. Mark's School in Southborough, Massachusetts, from 1947 to 1953. He dropped out of St. Mark's in his senior year when a car accident "caused him to miss a substantial amount of vital pre-graduation exam schooling."

== Career ==
After leaving high school, Musgrave enlisted in the United States Marine Corps in 1953. He served as an aviation electrician, instrument technician and aircraft crew chief while completing duty assignments in Korea, Japan and Hawaii, and aboard the carrier USS Wasp in the Far East. Musgrave's aviator brother Percy (1933–1959), who also served on USS Wasp, died on a mission when the carrier "ran over him" after a takeoff crash.

Although he did not qualify as a pilot until completing his stipulated astronaut training, Musgrave has flown 17,700 hours in 160 different types of civilian and military aircraft, including 7,500 hours in jet aircraft. He has earned FAA ratings for instructor, instrument instructor, glider instructor, and airline transport pilot in addition to astronaut wings. An accomplished parachutist, he has made more than 800 free falls, including over 100 experimental free-fall descents involved with the study of human aerodynamics.

While serving in the Marines, he completed his GED. Following his discharge, Musgrave received a Bachelor of Science degree in mathematics and statistics from Syracuse University in 1958. Following his graduation from Syracuse University, Musgrave was briefly employed as a mathematician and operations analyst by the Eastman Kodak Company in Rochester, New York in 1958.

Musgrave went on to receive a Master of Business Administration degree in operations analysis and computer programming from the University of California, Los Angeles in 1959, a Bachelor of Arts degree in chemistry from Marietta College in 1960, and a Doctor of Medicine degree from Columbia University College of Physicians and Surgeons in 1964.

Upon completing his medical degree, he served a surgical internship at the University of Kentucky Medical Center from 1964 to 1965. He continued there as a United States Air Force postdoctoral fellow (1965–1966), working in aerospace medicine and physiology, and as a National Heart Institute postdoctoral fellow (1966–1967), teaching and researching cardiovascular and exercise physiology. In 1966, he earned a Master of Science degree in physiology and biophysics from the University of Kentucky. From 1967 to 1989, he practiced clinical medicine on a part-time basis at Denver General Hospital (presently known as Denver Health Medical Center) and served as an adjunct instructor of physiology and biophysics at the University of Kentucky Medical Center. He earned a Master of Arts degree in literature from the University of Houston–Clear Lake in 1987.

He has written or been listed as a co-author of twenty-five scientific papers in the areas of aerospace medicine and physiology, temperature regulation, exercise physiology, and clinical surgery.

== NASA ==
Musgrave was selected as a scientist-astronaut by NASA in August 1967 as a member of NASA Astronaut Group 6. After completing flight and academic training, he worked on the design and development of the Skylab Program. In 1973, he was the backup Science Pilot for Skylab 2, becoming the first Group 6 astronaut to receive a potential flight assignment.

Musgrave participated in the design and development of all Space Shuttle extra-vehicular activity equipment, including spacesuits, life support systems, airlocks and Manned Maneuvering Units. From 1979 to 1982, and 1983 to 1984, he was assigned as a test and verification pilot in the Shuttle Avionics Integration Laboratory at JSC.

Musgrave served as a CAPCOM for the second and third Skylab missions, STS-31, STS-35, STS-36, STS-38 and STS-41. He was a mission specialist on STS-6 (1983), STS-51-F/Spacelab-2 (1985), STS-33 (1989), STS-44 (1991), and STS-80 (1996); and the payload commander on STS-61 (1993).

In total, Musgrave spent 53 days, 9 hours, and 55 minutes on space missions, including nearly 27 hours of Extravehicular activity (spacewalks).

Musgrave is the only astronaut to have flown on all five Space Shuttles. Prior to John Glenn's return to space in 1998, Musgrave held the record for the oldest person in orbit at age 61.

He retired from NASA in 1997, after 30 years as an astronaut.

== Spaceflight experience ==
=== STS-6 ===
He first flew on STS-6, which launched from the Kennedy Space Center, on April 4, 1983, and landed at Edwards Air Force Base in California, on April 9, 1983. During this maiden voyage of Space Shuttle Challenger, the crew performed the first Shuttle deployment of an IUS/TDRS satellite, and Musgrave and Don Peterson conducted the first Space Shuttle extra-vehicular activity (EVA) to test the new space suits and construction and repair devices and procedures. On this mission Musgrave became the first astronaut to do a spacewalk from a Space Shuttle. Mission duration was 5 days, 23 minutes, 42 seconds.

=== STS-51-F ===
On STS-51-F/Spacelab-2, the crew aboard Challenger launched from the Kennedy Space Center, Florida, on July 29, 1985, and landed at Edwards Air Force Base, California, on August 6, 1985. This flight was the first pallet-only Spacelab mission, and the first mission to operate the Spacelab Instrument Pointing System (IPS). It carried 13 major experiments in astronomy, astrophysics, and life sciences. During this mission, Musgrave served as the systems engineer during launch and entry, and as a pilot during the orbital operations. Mission duration was 7 days, 22 hours, 45 minutes, 26 seconds.

=== STS-33 ===
On STS-33, he served aboard the Space Shuttle Discovery, which launched at night from the Kennedy Space Center, Florida, on November 22, 1989. This classified mission operated payloads for the United States Department of Defense. Following 79 orbits, the mission concluded on November 27, 1989, with a landing at sunset on Runway 04 at Edwards Air Force Base, California. Mission duration was 5 days, 7 minutes, 32 seconds.

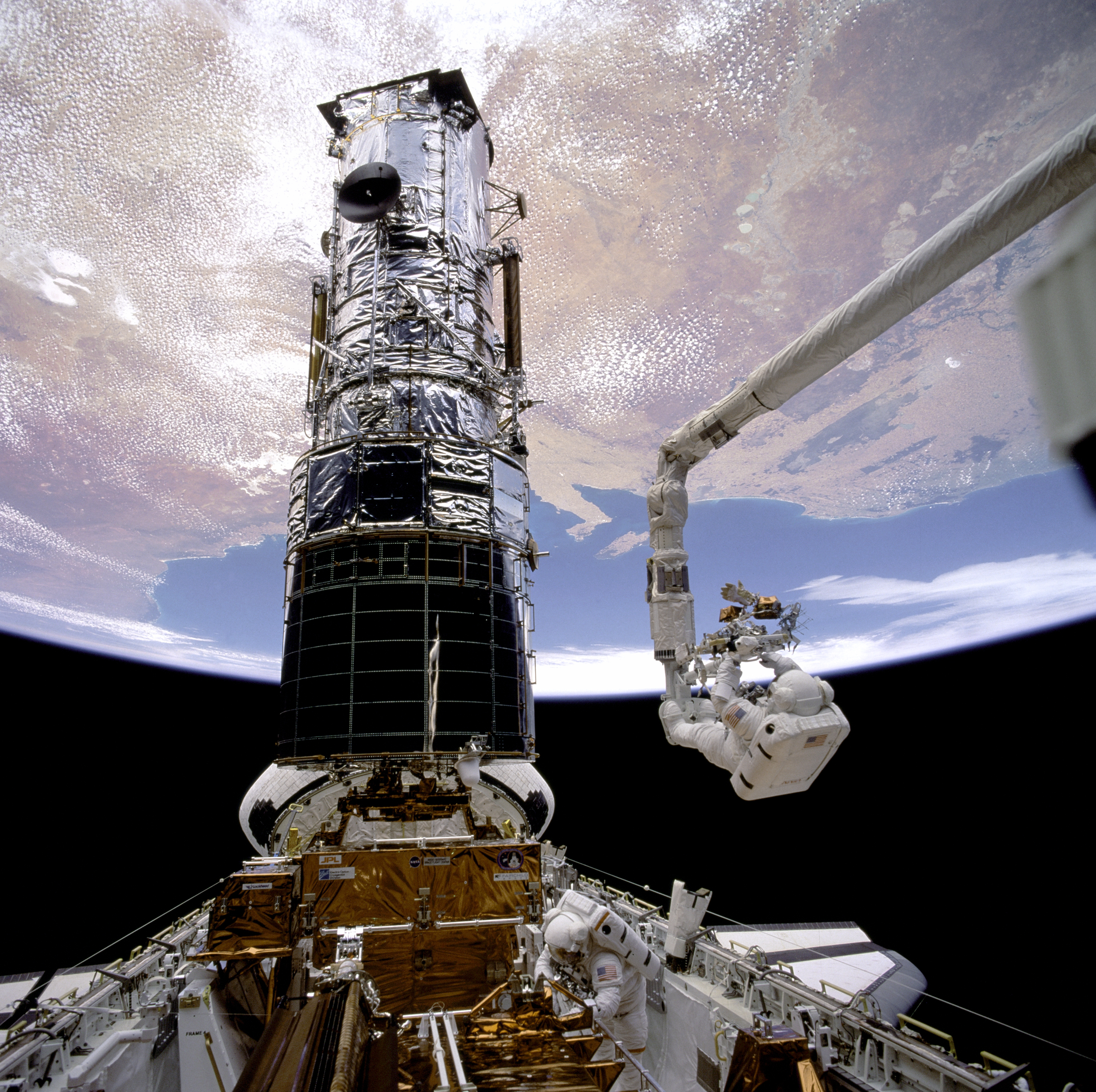
Musgrave, anchored on the end of the Canadarm, prepares to be elevated to the top of the Hubble Space Telescope to install protective covers on the magnetometers as part of STS-61

=== STS-44 ===
STS-44 also launched at night on November 24, 1991. The primary mission objective was accomplished with the successful deployment of a Defense Support Program (DSP) satellite with an Inertial Upper Stage (IUS) rocket booster. In addition, the crew also conducted two Military Man in Space Experiments, three radiation monitoring experiments, and numerous medical tests to support longer duration Shuttle flights. The mission was concluded in 110 orbits of the Earth with Atlantis returning to a landing on the lakebed at Edwards Air Force Base, California, on December 1, 1991. Mission duration was 6 days, 22 hours, 50 minutes, 42 seconds.

=== STS-61 ===
STS-61 was the first Hubble Space Telescope (HST) servicing and repair mission. Following a night launch from Kennedy Space Center on December 2, 1993, Endeavour rendezvoused with and captured the HST. During this 11-day flight, the HST was restored to its full capabilities through the work of two pairs of astronauts during a record 5 spacewalks. Musgrave performed 3 of these spacewalks, becoming the first astronaut-physician to do a spacewalk on two space missions. After having travelled 4,433,772 miles in 163 orbits of the Earth, Endeavour returned to a night landing in Florida on December 13, 1993. Mission duration was 10 days, 19 hours, 59 minutes.

=== STS-80 ===
On STS-80, (November 19 to December 7, 1996), the crew aboard Space Shuttle Columbia deployed and retrieved the Wake Shield Facility (WSF) and the Orbiting Retrievable Far and Extreme Ultraviolet Spectrometer (ORFEUS) satellites. The free-flying WSF created a super vacuum in its wake in which to grow thin film wafers for use in semiconductors and the electronics industry. The ORFEUS instruments, mounted on the reusable Shuttle Pallet Satellite, studied the origin and makeup of stars.

During deorbit and landing, Musgrave stood on Columbia's flight deck and used a handheld video camera to record the plasma visible outside the orbiter's aft overhead windows during reentry. According to astronaut Tom Jones, Musgrave remained standing on the flight deck for much entire descent, observing and filming the phenomenon despite the physical demands of reentry, going from microgravity to extended periods of 1.7 g_{0} (17 m/s^{2}). Jones later described this as consistent with Musgrave's approach to spaceflight, seeking to directly experience and document the event.

In completing this mission he logged a record 278 Earth orbits and traveled over 7 million miles (11 million kilometers) in 17 days, 15 hours, and 53 minutes.

== Media appearances and space snakes ==
Musgrave has made cameo appearances on several documentary TV programs, as well as the movie Mission to Mars (2000) as "3rd CAPCOM" and the TV show Home Improvement (Series 3, Episode 24, "Reality Bytes"). In 2012, he appeared at Chicon 7, the 70th World Science Fiction Convention, as the "Astronaut Guest of Honor."

On two of my missions, and I still don't have an answer, um, I have seen a, a snake out there, six seven eight feet long. It is rubbery because it has internal waves in it and it follows you for a rather long period of time.

— Story Musgrave, Sightings, 1995

In 1995 while being interviewed for a space documentary, Sightings, Musgrave irked NASA officials and surprised his colleagues when he declared that during two of his missions he saw "snakes" floating around in space - a fact that he failed to officially report to NASA upon his return.

All kinds of debris come off space ships, especially at the back end after the main engines shut down and you open the doors: ice chips, oxygen or hydrogen, stuff dumped from the engines. On two flights I've seen and photographed what I call "the snake," like a seven-foot eel swimming out there. It may be an uncritical rubber seal from the main engines. In zero g it's totally free to maneuver, and it has its own internal waves like it's swimming.

— Story Musgrave, Interview with Omni, August 1994

In an interview with Omni, Musgrave mentioned seeing what he calls "the snake" on two flights and speculated it to be a rubber seal.

== Organizations ==
He is a member of Phi Delta Theta, Alpha Kappa Psi, the American Association for the Advancement of Science, Beta Gamma Sigma, the Civil Aviation Medical Association, the Flying Physicians Association, the International Academy of Astronautics, the Marine Corps Aviation Association, the National Aeronautic Association, the National Aerospace Education Council, the National Geographic Society, the Navy League, the New York Academy of Sciences, Omicron Delta Kappa, the Soaring Club of Houston, the Soaring Society of America and the United States Parachute Association.

== Personal life ==
He has seven children, one of whom is deceased. His hobbies include chess, flying, gardening, literary criticism, poetry, microcomputers, parachuting, photography, reading, running, scuba diving, and soaring.

In the early 1990s, Musgrave was stalked by Margaret Mary Ray, a schizophrenic woman who had previously served a prison sentence for stalking comedian David Letterman. Upon Ray's suicide in 1998, Musgrave publicly expressed sympathy, describing her as a "creative genius".

== Awards and honors ==
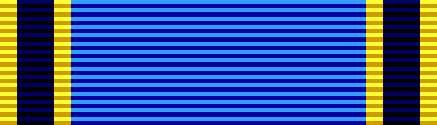

Meritorious Unit Commendation | NASA Distinguished Service Medal
NASA Exceptional Service Medal with one star	NASA Space Flight Medal with five stars	National Defense Service Medal

- United States Air Force Post-doctoral Fellowship (1965–1966)
- National Heart Institute Post-doctoral Fellowship (1966–1967)
- Reese Air Force Base Commander's Trophy (1969)
- American College of Surgeons I.S. Ravdin Lecture (1973)
- Flying Physicians Association Airman of the Year Award (1974 and 1983)
- Golden Plate Award of the American Academy of Achievement (1994)
- International Space Hall of Fame (1995)
- National Aviation Hall of Fame (2022)

== See also ==
- List of spaceflight records
