= Kent Rominger =

American astronaut (born 1956)

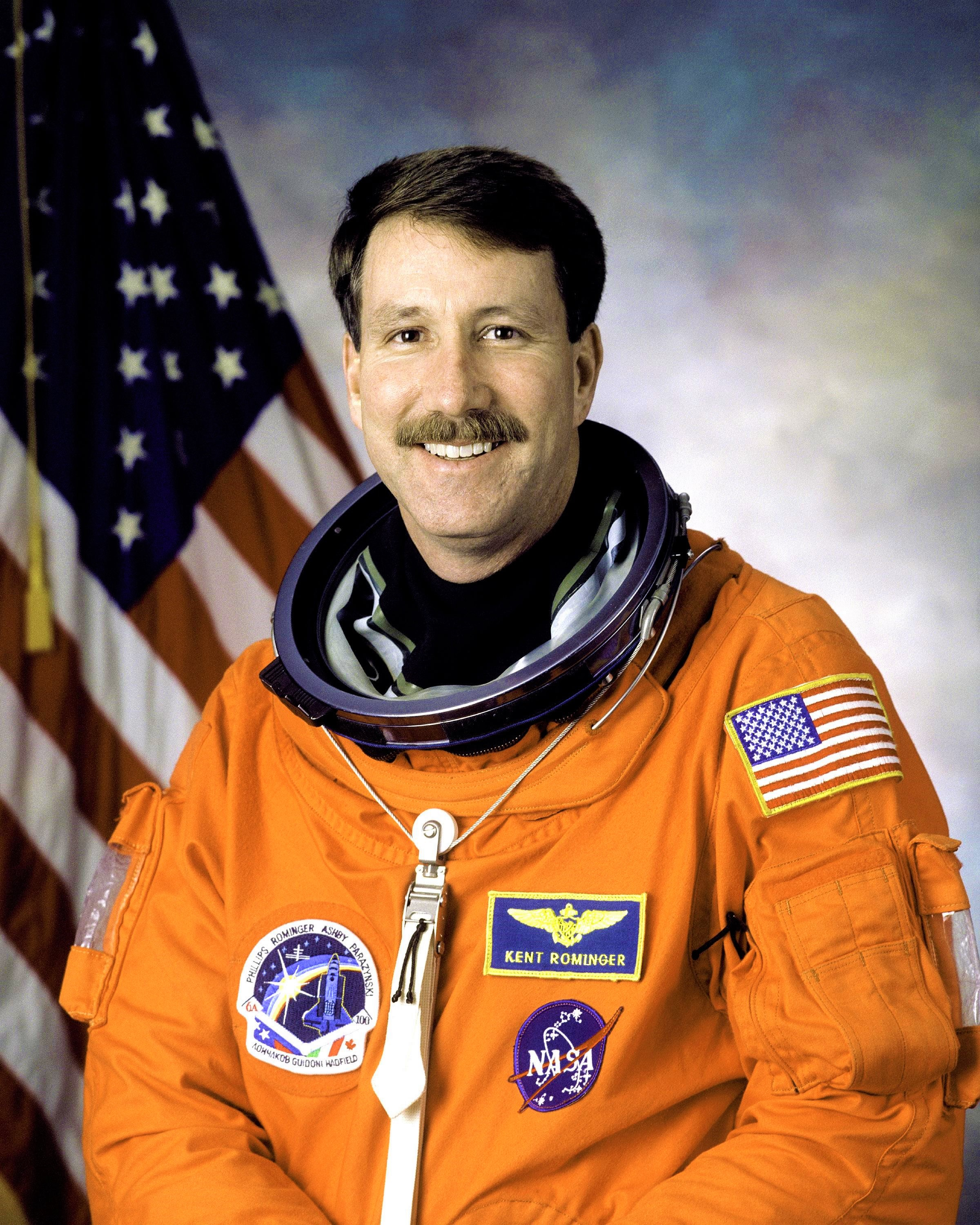
- Born: Kent Vernon Rominger; August 7, 1956 (age 70); Del Norte, Colorado, U.S.
- Other name: Rommel
- Education: Colorado State University (BS); Naval Postgraduate School (MS)
- Space career

NASA astronaut
- Rank: Captain, USN
- Time in space: 67d 2h 58m
- Selection: NASA Group 14 (1992)
- Missions: STS-73; STS-80; STS-85; STS-96; STS-100
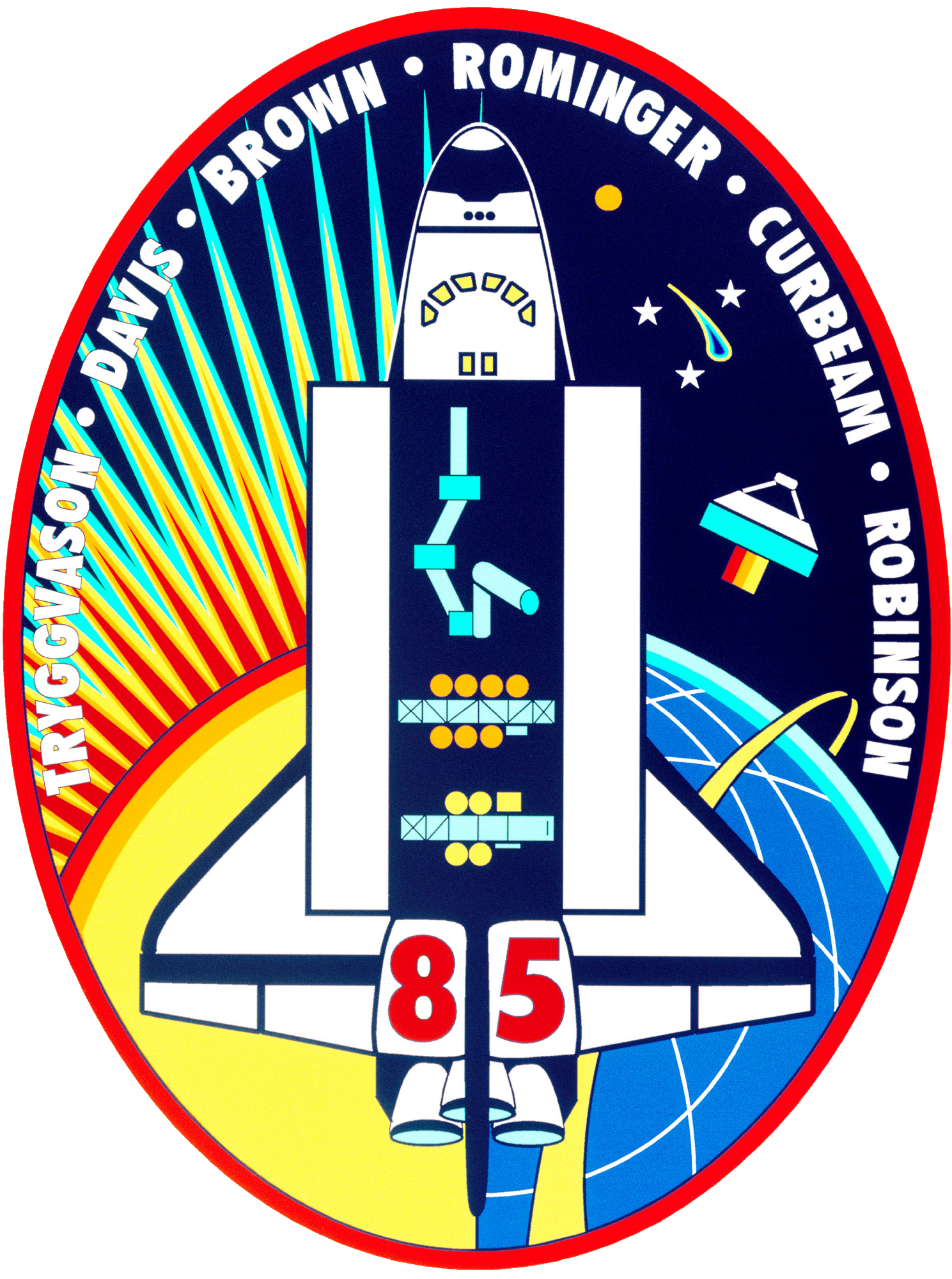
- Mission insignia

Kent Vernon "Rommel" Rominger (born August 7, 1956) is an American former astronaut, former NASA Chief of the Astronaut Office at Johnson Space Center, and a captain in the United States Navy. Rominger holds the Space Shuttle Orbiter flight time record with 1610 hours. He joined ATK Launch Systems Group in 2006 as Vice President of Advanced Programs.

== Personal data ==
Kent Rominger was born August 7, 1956, in Del Norte, Colorado. He graduated from Del Norte High School in 1974. In 1978, he received a Bachelor of Science degree in civil engineering from Colorado State University, and in 1987 a Master of Science degree in aeronautical engineering from the U.S. Naval Postgraduate School. He and his wife Mary Sue have one daughter.

== Naval service ==
Rominger received his commission through the Aviation Reserve Officer Candidate (AVROC) Program in 1979, and was designated a Naval Aviator in September 1980. Following training in the F-14 Tomcat, he was assigned to Fighter Squadron 2 (VF-2) from October 1981 to January 1985 aboard the aircraft carriers USS Ranger and USS Kitty Hawk. While assigned to VF-2, Rominger attended the Navy Fighter Weapons School (TOPGUN). In 1987 he completed the Naval Postgraduate School/Test Pilot School Cooperative Program, and was assigned as F-14 Project Officer to the Carrier Suitability Branch of the Strike Aircraft Test Directorate at Naval Air Station Patuxent River, Maryland. During his tour of duty, Rominger completed the initial carrier suitability sea trials of the F-14B, logging the first aircraft carrier arrestment and catapult launch in the upgraded Tomcat. In September 1990, he reported to Fighter Squadron 211 (VF-211), where he served as Operations Officer and completed a Desert Storm Deployment to the Persian Gulf aboard USS Nimitz.

He has logged over 5,000 flying hours in over 35 types of aircraft and 685 carrier landings.

== NASA career ==
Selected by NASA in March 1992, Rominger reported to the Johnson Space Center in August 1992. He completed one year of training and qualified for assignment as a pilot on future Space Shuttle flight crews. Rominger was initially assigned to work technical issues for the Astronaut Office Operations Development Branch. He also served as Chief of the Astronaut Office Shuttle Operations Branch, and deputy director, Flight Crew Operations. A veteran of five space flights, Rominger has logged over 1,600 hours in space These were all as a STS Orbiter crew member, the highest total in this category. He flew as pilot on STS-73 in 1995, STS-80 in 1996 and STS-85 in 1997, and was crew commander on STS-96 in 1999 and STS-100 in 2001. Rominger served as Chief of the Astronaut Office and professional head of the NASA Astronaut Corps from 2002 to 2006, responsible for the mission preparation activities of all Space Shuttle and future International Space Station crews and their support personnel.

== Space flight experience ==
STS-73 in Space Shuttle Columbia (October 20 to November 5, 1995) was the second United States Microgravity Laboratory mission. The mission focused on materials science, biotechnology, combustion science, fluid dynamics, and numerous scientific experiments housed in the pressurized Spacelab module. In completing his first space flight, Rominger orbited the Earth 256 times, traveled over 6 million miles, and logged a total of 15 days, 21 hours, and 52 minutes in space.

STS-80, also in Columbia (November 19 to December 7, 1996) was a 17-day mission during which the crew deployed and retrieved the Wake Shield Facility (WSF) and the Orbiting Retrievable Far and Extreme Ultraviolet Spectrometer (ORFEUS) satellites. The free-flying WSF created a super vacuum in its wake and grew thin film wafers for use in semiconductors and other high-tech electrical components. The ORFEUS instruments, mounted on the reusable Shuttle Pallet Satellite, studied the origin and makeup of stars. In completing his second space flight, Rominger orbited the Earth a record 278 times, traveled over 7 million miles and logged 17 days, 15 hours and 53 minutes in space.

STS-85 in Space Shuttle Discovery (August 7–19, 1997) was a 12-day mission during which the crew deployed and retrieved the CRISTA-SPAS satellite, operated the Japanese Manipulator Flight Demonstration (MFD) robotic arm, studied changes in the Earth's atmosphere and tested technology destined for use on the future International Space Station. The mission was accomplished in 189 Earth orbits, traveling 4.7 million miles in 11 days, 20 hours and 27 minutes.

STS-96, also in Discovery, (May 27 to June 6, 1999) was a 10-day mission during which the crew delivered 4 tons of logistics and supplies to the International Space Station in preparation for the arrival of the first crew to live on the station. The mission included the first docking of a Space Shuttle to the International Space Station and was accomplished in 153 Earth orbits, traveling 4 million miles in 9 days, 19 hours and 13 minutes.

STS-100, in Space Shuttle Endeavour (April 19 to May 1, 2001) was a 12-day mission during which the crew installed the Canadian-built Robotic Arm and the Rafaello Logistics Module to the International Space Station. Endeavour was docked 8-days on the most complex robotics flight in the history of the Space Shuttle program and was made up of a very diverse international crew, representing the United States, Russia, Canada and Italy. The mission was completed in 187 Earth orbits, traveling 4.9 million miles in 11 days, 21 hours and 30 minutes.

== Organizations ==
He is a member of the Association of Space Explorers, the Society of Experimental Test Pilots, the American Institute of Aeronautics and Astronautics, the Association of Naval Aviation, The Mars Generation, and the Chi Epsilon Civil Engineering Society.

== Awards and honors ==
He has been awarded the Defense Superior Service Medal, the Distinguished Flying Cross, the Defense Meritorious Service Medal and the NASA Distinguished Service Medal. He is a Distinguished Graduate of the U.S. Naval Test Pilot School and was the Naval Air Test Center Test Pilot of the Year in 1988. He received the Society of Experimental Test Pilots Ray E. Tenhoff Award in 1990, the Jack Northrop Award in 1996, and the Colorado State University Distinguished Service Award in 1997. He was named West Coast Tomcat Fighter Pilot of the Year in 1992 and was listed in the Top Ten Carrier Landing Distinction in Airwings Two and Nine. In 2000 he was nominated and inducted into the Colorado Aviation Hall of Fame. He is an inductee into the United States Astronaut Hall of Fame. The airport in Del Norte, Colorado (KRCV) is named in his honor.

== NASA ==
Preceded by Charles J. Precourt	Chief of the Astronaut Office; 2002–2006	Succeeded by Steven W. Lindsey
