= Mission Earth =

Mission Earth may refer to:

- Mission Earth (novel series), series of ten novels by Scientology founder L. Ron Hubbard (1985)
- Mission: Earth, Voyage to the Home Planet, a collaboration between author June English and astronaut Thomas David Jones (1996)
- Mission Earth (album), music album by Edgar Winter, inspired by novel by L. Ron Hubbard (1989)

== See also ==
- ToeJam & Earl III: Mission to Earth, a 2002 video game
