= Diane Evans =

Diane Evans could refer to:

- Diane Carlson Evans (born 1946), American Army nurse
- Diane L. Evans, American geologist
- Diane Evans, fictional character on the American television series Roswell

== See also ==
- Diana Evans (born 1972), British writer
