= Margaret Ray =

Margaret Ray is the name of:

- Dixy Lee Ray (1914–1994), seventeenth governor of Washington State
- Margaret Mary Ray (1952–1998), stalker
- Margaret Ray (Australian politician) (1933–2017), Australian politician
