= Kenneth Cockrell =

American astronaut and engineer (born 1950)

Ken Cockrell
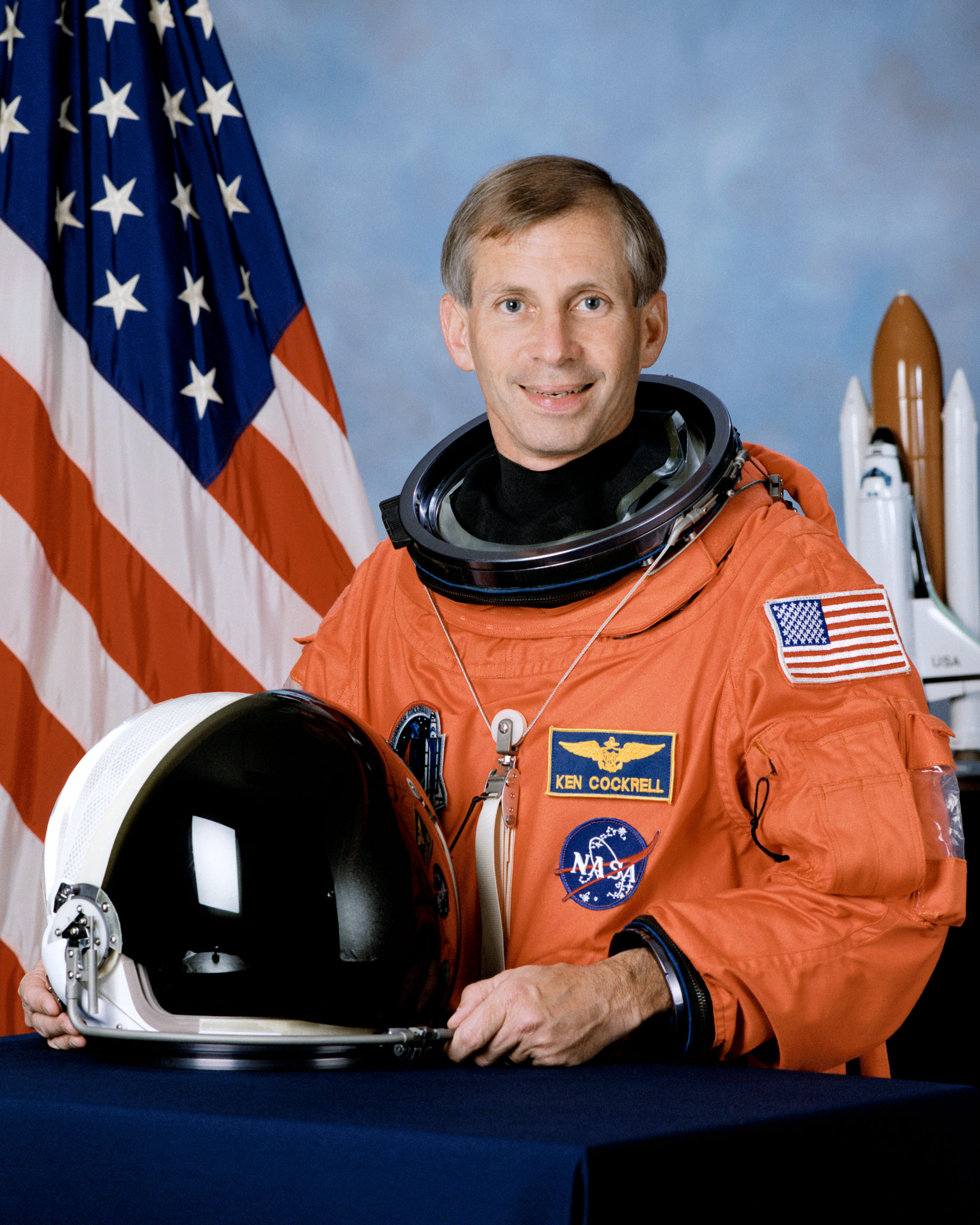
- Born: Kenneth Dale Cockrell; April 9, 1950 (age 76); Austin, Texas, U.S.
- Other name: Taco
- Education: University of Texas at Austin (BS); University of West Florida (MS)
- Space career

NASA astronaut
- Rank: Captain, USN
- Time in space: 64d 12h 24m
- Selection: NASA Group 13 (1990)
- Missions: STS-56; STS-69; STS-80; STS-98; STS-111
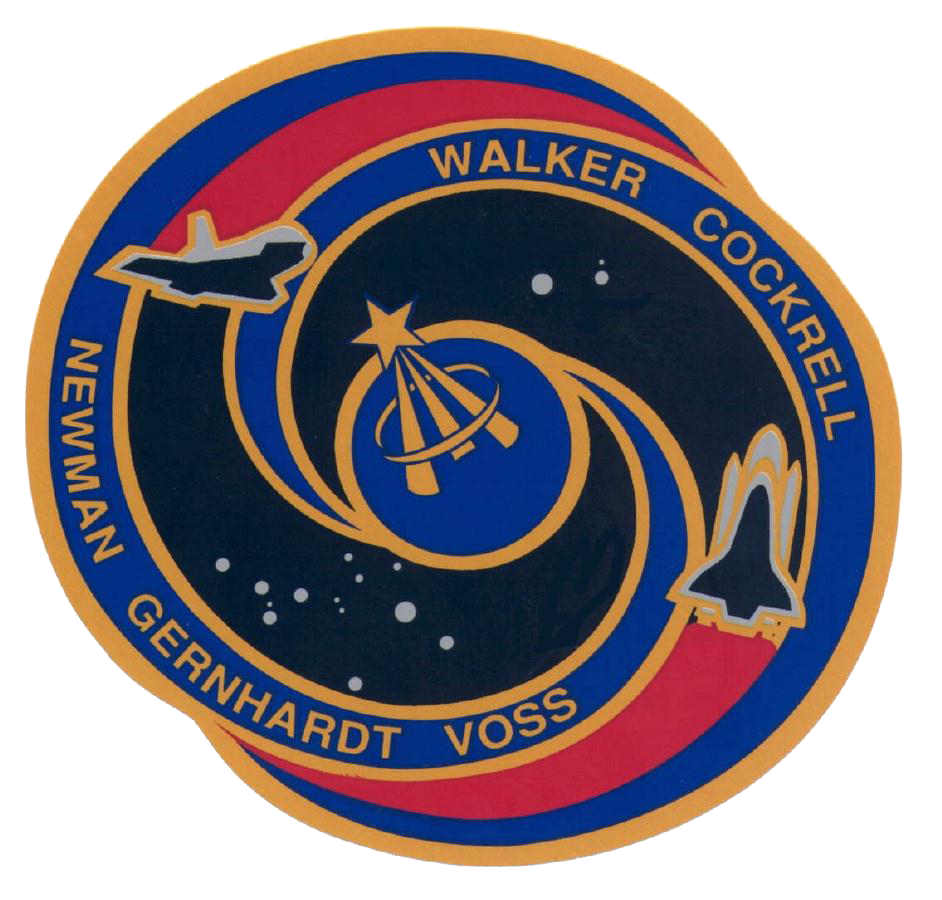
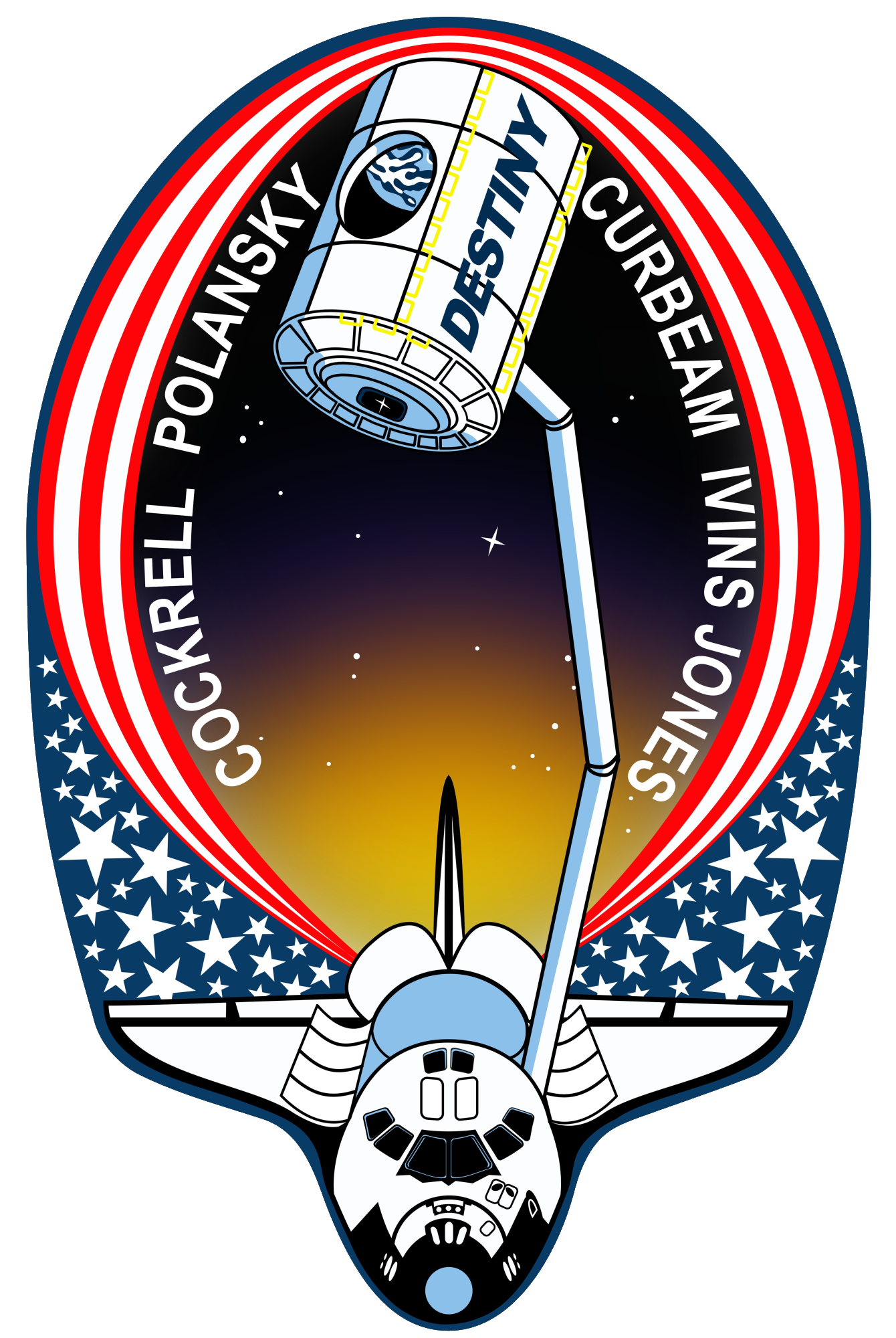
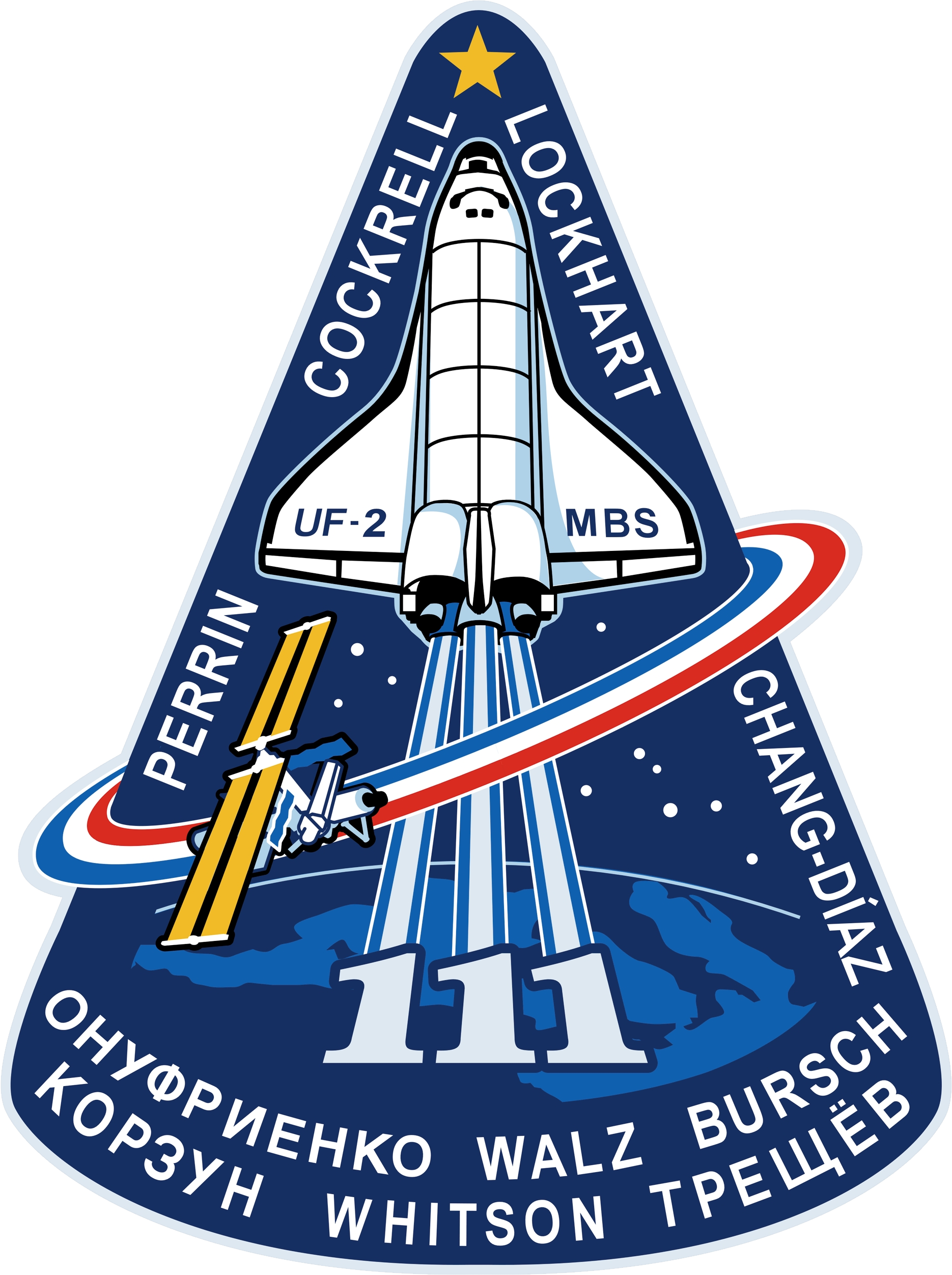
- Mission insignia

Kenneth Dale "Taco" Cockrell (born April 9, 1950) is a retired American astronaut, engineer and a veteran of five Space Shuttle missions. He served as Chief of the Astronaut Office from 1997 to 1998.

== Pre-NASA career ==
Cockrell was born in Austin, Texas, to Buford Dale Cockrell and Jewell Moorman. Growing up, he spent some time living in Geelong, Victoria, Australia. He graduated from Rockdale High School in nearby Rockdale, Texas, in 1968. He earned a bachelor's degree in mechanical engineering from the University of Texas at Austin in 1972 and received his commission in the United States Navy that same year. He also earned a master's in aeronautical systems from the University of West Florida in 1974. He was trained as a pilot and was stationed from 1975 to 1978 aboard the aircraft carrier USS Midway. Cockrell then became a test pilot for several years before serving two tours of duty aboard USS Constellation. In 1987, Cockrell resigned from the Navy and joined the Aircraft Operations Division of Johnson Space Center as a research pilot.

== NASA experience ==
Selected by NASA in January 1990, Cockrell became an astronaut in July 1991. His technical assignments to date include: duties in the Astronaut Office Operations Development Branch, working on landing, rollout, tires and brakes issues; CAPCOM in Mission Control for ascent and entry; Astronaut Office representative for Flight Data File, the numerous books of procedures carried aboard Shuttle flights. He also served as Assistant to the Chief of the Astronaut Office for Shuttle operations and hardware, Chief of the Astronaut Office Operations Development Branch, and Chief of the Astronaut Office. He served one year as Director of Operations, Russia, in Star City, Russia. He served as the liaison between the Astronaut Office and the training organization at the Gagarin Cosmonaut Training Center in Star City. Cockrell is currently the Assistant Director, Flight Crew Operations, for aircraft operations. In addition, he serves as an instructor pilot in the T-38 airplane.

A veteran of five space flights, Cockrell has logged over 1,560 hours in space. He served as a mission specialist on STS-56 (April 8–17, 1993), was the pilot on STS-69 (September 7–18, 1995), and was the mission commander on STS-80 (November 19 to December 7, 1996), STS-98 (February 7–20, 2001), and STS-111 (June 5–19, 2002).

Cockrell was reassigned in February 2006 to Flight Crew Operations' Aircraft Operations Division (AOD) at Ellington Field, as the WB-57 High Altitude Research Program Manager. He manages NASA's two WB-57F research airplanes and serves as pilot for research flights. In addition, he is a T-38 Instructor Pilot for astronaut flight training.

== Spaceflight experience ==
=== STS-56 ===
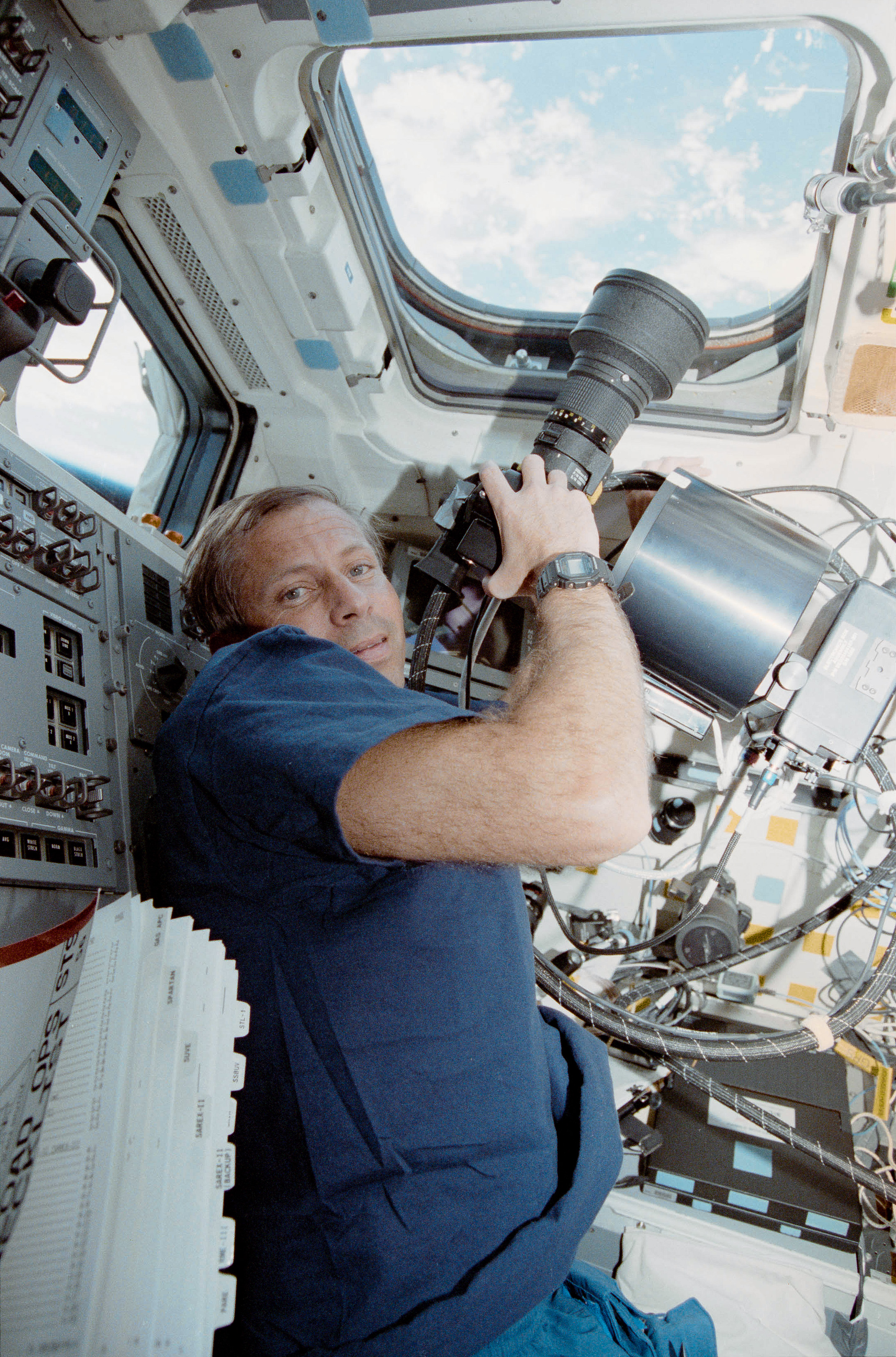
Cockrell during STS-56

STS-56 carrying ATLAS-2 was a nine-day mission aboard the Space Shuttle Discovery during which the crew conducted atmospheric and solar studies in order to better understand the effect of solar activity on the Earth's climate and environment. STS-56 launched April 8, 1993, and landed April 17, 1993. Mission duration was 9 days, 6 hours, 9 minutes, 21 seconds.

=== STS-69 ===
STS-69 was a 10-day mission aboard the Space Shuttle Endeavour. The primary objective of STS-69 was the successful deployment and retrieval of a SPARTAN satellite and the Wake Shield Facility (WSF). The WSF was designed to evaluate the effectiveness of using a free-flying platform to grow semiconductors, high temperature superconductors and other materials using the ultra-high vacuum created behind the spacecraft. STS-69 launched September 7, 1995, and landed September 18, 1995. Mission duration was 10 days, 20 hours, 28 minutes.

=== STS-80 ===
STS-80 was a 17-day mission aboard the Space Shuttle Columbia. During STS-80 the crew deployed and retrieved the Wake Shield Facility (WSF) and the Orbiting Retrievable Far and Extreme Ultraviolet Spectrometer (ORFEUS) satellites. The ORFEUS instruments, mounted on the reusable Shuttle Pallet Satellite, studied the origin and makeup of stars. STS-80 launched November 19, 1996, and landed December 7, 1996. Mission duration was a record-breaking 17 days, 15 hours, 53 minutes.

=== STS-98 ===
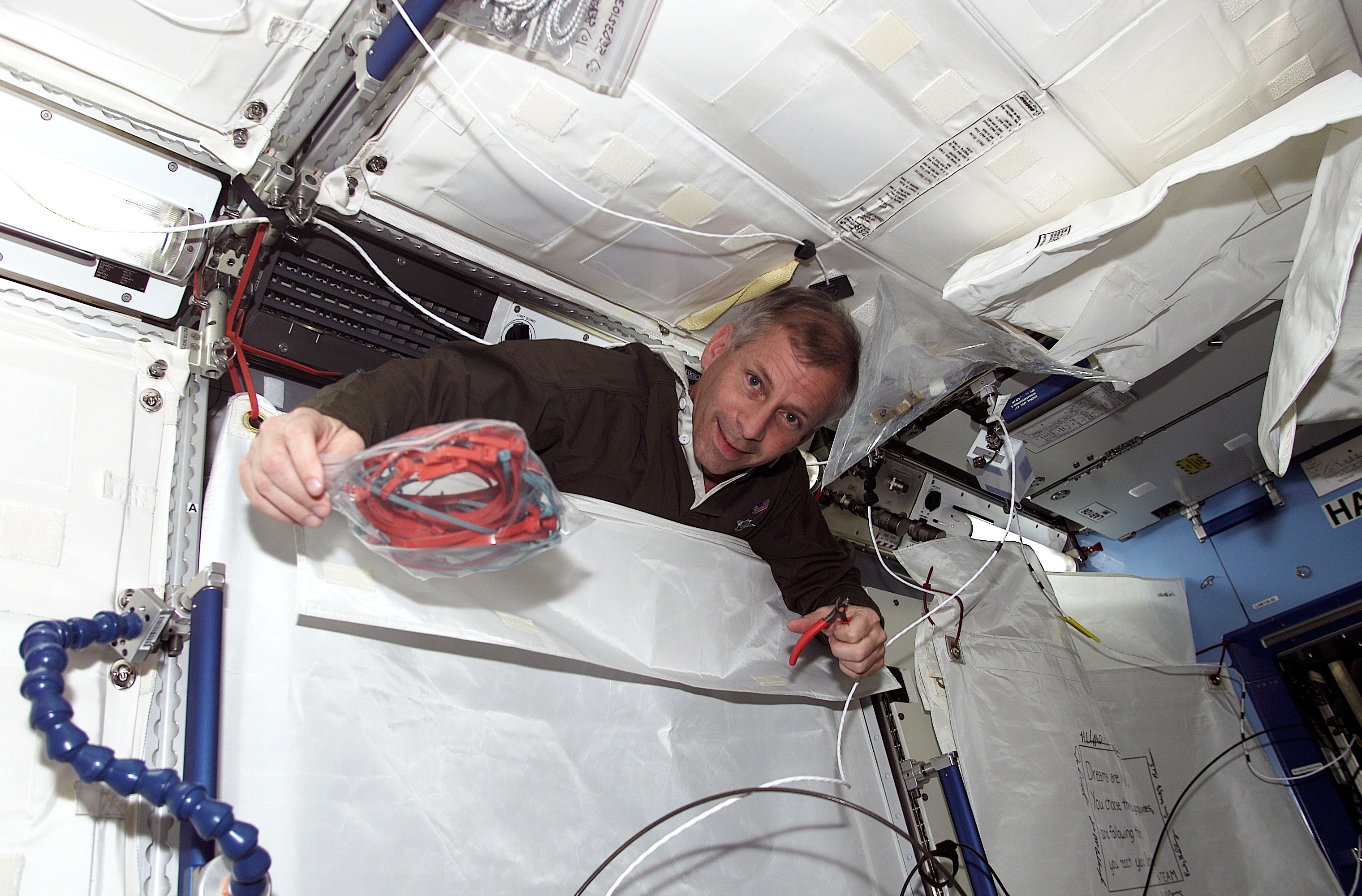
Cockrell as STS-98 commander, emerges from behind a rack curtain in Destiny.

STS-98 was a 12-day mission aboard the Space Shuttle Atlantis. The STS-98 crew continued the task of building and enhancing the International Space Station by delivering the U.S. laboratory module Destiny. The Shuttle spent seven days docked to the station while Destiny was attached, and three spacewalks were conducted to complete its assembly. The crew also relocated a docking port, and delivered supplies and equipment to the resident Expedition-1 crew. STS-98 launched February 7, 2001, and landed February 20, 2001. Mission duration was 12 days, 21 hours, 20 minutes. Unacceptable weather conditions in Florida necessitated a landing at Edwards Air Force Base, California.

=== STS-111 ===
STS-111 was a 13-day mission aboard the Space Shuttle Endeavour. The STS-111 mission delivered a new ISS resident crew and a Canadian-built mobile base for the orbiting outpost's robotic arm. The crew also performed a late-notice repair of the station's robot arm by replacing one of the arm's joints. It was the second Space Shuttle mission dedicated to delivering research equipment to the space platform. STS-111 also brought home the Expedition-Four crew from their 6 1/2-month stay aboard the station. STS-111 launched June 5, 2002, and landed June 19, 2002. Mission duration was 13 days, 20 hours and 35 minutes. Unacceptable weather conditions in Florida necessitated a landing at Edwards Air Force Base, California.

== Awards ==
Cockrell's awards include the National Defense Service Medal, Naval Aviator Badge, and the Naval Astronaut Badge.

== Personal life ==
Cockrell has two children and lives in Friendswood, Texas. His recreational interests include: sport flying, snow and water skiing. He was also called Taco by his fellow astronauts.

Preceded by Robert D. Cabana	Chief of the Astronaut Office; 1997–1998	Succeeded by Charles J. Precourt
