= Mission: Earth, Voyage to the Home Planet =

Book by Thomas David Jones

Mission: Earth
- Book cover
- Authors: June A. English, Thomas David Jones
- Language: English
- Subject: Human spaceflight
- Genre: Non-fiction
- Publisher: Scholastic
- Publication date: 1996
- Publication place: United States
- Media type: Hardback
- Pages: 40
- ISBN: 0-590-48571-7
- OCLC: 32464949
- Followed by: The Scholastic Encyclopedia of the U.S. at War (1998)

Mission: Earth, Voyage to the Home Planet is a children's literature book by science writer June A. English and astronaut Thomas David Jones that was published in 1996 by Scholastic. Jones was among the crew members of the Space Shuttle Endeavour during an eleven-day mission in space, which was launched in April 1994 to study the ecological well-being of Earth using specialized radar technology. The book, which is illustrated with radar images and picturesque photographs, chronicles the mission and Jones' experiences of it.

Mission: Earth, Voyage to the Home Planet received a generally favorable reception in media coverage and book reviewers. The Pittsburgh Post-Gazette said, "The authors convey the awe and wonderment of seeing Earth from space and the intricate delicacy of the Earth's ecology". The Dallas Morning News said, "The astronaut's descriptions are vivid". A review in Booklist was more critical; it said, "The authors try to cover too much in so few pages, and the narrative, with several focal points, becomes simplified at times". School Library Journal wrote, "It provides a unique look at a new method of research and an opportunity for youngsters to read one scientist's account of what it's like to engage in this exciting field of endeavor". The book was selected for inclusion in books Best Books for Children, and Adventuring With Books, or educating youths about history by using children's literature works.

== Background ==
June A. English is an author who specializes in science writing. She has published works within the genre of children's literature.

Thomas David Jones was a member of the United States Air Force prior to working for NASA. As Jones was a United States federal employee at the time of the book's publication, he did not receive profits from sales of the work. English and Jones later produced another collaborative work, Scholastic Encyclopedia of the United States at War, which was published in 1998. Jones wrote another book about his experiences in space, Sky Walking: An Astronaut's Memoir, which was published in 2006.

== Contents ==
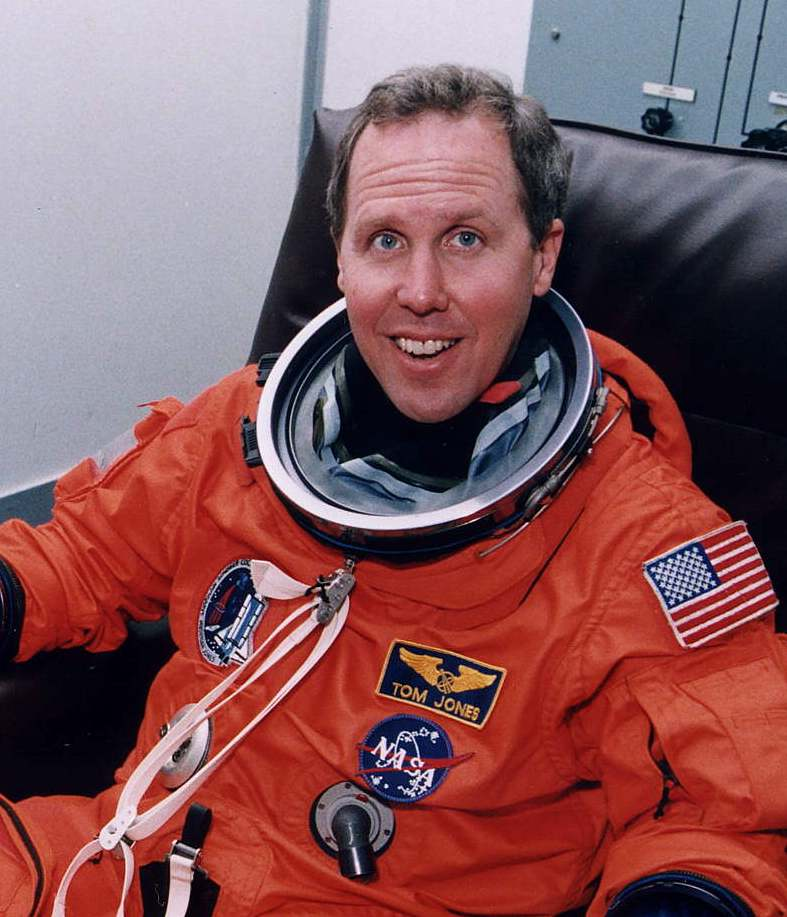
Thomas David Jones (1996)

In Mission: Earth, Voyage to the Home Planet, astronaut Thomas David Jones recounts his experiences studying the Earth during his first mission with the United States space agency NASA. Jones' space mission lasted eleven days. Jones was a member of the crew of the Space Shuttle Endeavour, which left Earth in April 1994. The mission was intended to provide the Space Radar Lab with a view of the planet. By using three separate radar echoes, scientists were able to analyze a full image of the planet. The radar technology could penetrate obstructions, including clouds and thick outgrowth of trees. Another purpose of the mission was to analyze the ecological state of the planet and to take measurements of pollution caused by carbon monoxide.

The book is based upon journal entries written by Jones during the mission. He presents a typical NASA mission member's day-to-day experiences while living on the Space Shuttle. Jones illustrates his account with photographs from his mission and pictures from the radar capture. He describes his observations while looking at the Earth from space, for example he says, "Maybe more than any other sight from space, lightning gives the decided impression that the Earth is alive, a living organism". He described aurora phenomena as, "shimmering fingers of green light reaching up from the dark ocean, an arc of light around the South Magnetic Pole". June English provides contextual information about Jones' mission.

== Reception ==
Mission: Earth, Voyage to the Home Planet received a positive review from journalist Rebecca O'Connell, who wrote in the Pittsburgh Post-Gazette, "The authors convey the awe and wonderment of seeing Earth from space and the intricate delicacy of the Earth's ecology". She said of the descriptive nature of the text, "Their descriptions of scientific phenomena read like revelations of mystic wonders. But this is not to say it is ponderous, not at all." O'Connell's review concluded, "The text is packed with fascinating information and humorous touches. Even children who are not ordinarily interested in space or ecology will be interested in this book, and aficionados will go ga-ga." Leigh Fenly of The San Diego Union-Tribune recommended the book, and said, "Science writer June English tracked the launch and adds perspective on how the mission will help scientists understand Earth, including its atmosphere, geology, ecology—and future". Nita Thurman wrote for The Dallas Morning News, "Mission: Earth, A Journey to the Home Planet has dozens of color photos taken inside the shuttle and through its windows. The astronaut's descriptions are vivid." Publishers Weekly wrote favorably of the book, saying, "Astronaut Jones's enthusiasm for his work is contagious; it shines through the text, making for a roundly enjoyable and informative read". Publishers Weekly recommended the book and said it is, "[w]ell-conceived and thoughtfully executed, this book deserves a wide audience."

"The authors convey the awe and wonderment of seeing Earth from space and the intricate delicacy of the Earth's ecology."

— Pittsburgh Post-Gazette

A review of the book by Ilana Steinhorn in Booklist was more critical. Steinhorn said, "The authors try to cover too much in so few pages, and the narrative, with several focal points, becomes simplified at times ... Still, the account is interesting, and the many high-quality, often breathtaking color photographs and radar images complement the text nicely". Elaine Fort Weischedel reviewed the book for School Library Journal, and recommended it for teaching specific subject matter. She wrote, "Pollution patterns, shifting ocean currents, destruction of rain forests, and other environmental changes were the heart of Jones's project, and this book might be used more successfully to supplement the curriculum in those areas than in units on space flight per se". Weischedel said the book "provides a unique look at a new method of research and an opportunity for youngsters to read one scientist's account of what it's like to engage in this exciting field of endeavor". Horn Book Review called the book "a uniquely personal account", and said it "features a crowded design, but the many color photographs throughout the text are fascinating".

Mission: Earth, Voyage to the Home Planet is listed in the book Teaching U.S. history through children's literature: post-World War II by Wanda J. Miller as a resource for educating youth about history by using children's literature works. It is used in other such books, including Strategies That Work: Teaching Comprehension for Understanding and Engagement by Stephanie Harvey and Anne Goudvis, Reading Comprehension: Books and Strategies for the Elementary Curriculum by Kathryn K. Matthew and Kimberly Kimbell-Lopez, and An Integrated Language Perspective in the Elementary School: An Action Approach by Christine Pappas, Barbara Zulandt Kiefer, and Linda S. Levstik. It was selected for inclusion in Best Books for Children by John Thomas Gillespie, and Adventuring With Books by Kathryn Mitchell Pierce.

== See also ==
- International Space Station
- Kennedy Space Center
- Space Shuttle program
- STS-59
- STS-68
- STS-80
- STS-98
