= Thomas David Jones =

American astronaut (born 1955)

Thomas Jones
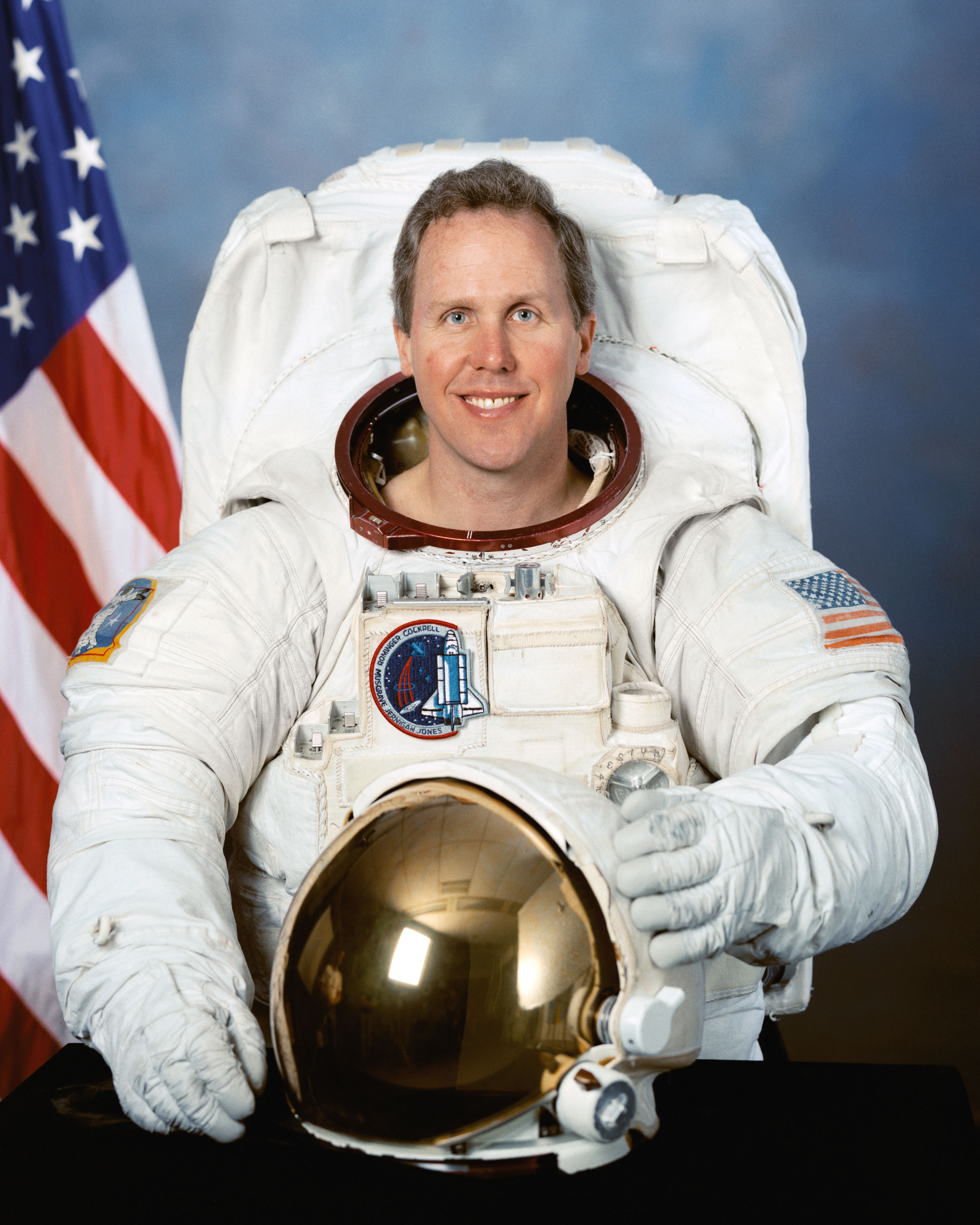
- Born: Thomas David Jones; January 22, 1955 (age 71); Baltimore, Maryland, U.S.
- Education: United States Air Force Academy (BS); University of Arizona (MS, PhD)
- Space career

NASA astronaut
- Rank: Captain, USAF
- Time in space: 53d 0h 49m
- Selection: NASA Group 13 (1990)
- Total EVAs: 3
- Total EVA time: 19h, 49m
- Mission: STS-59; STS-68; STS-80; STS-98
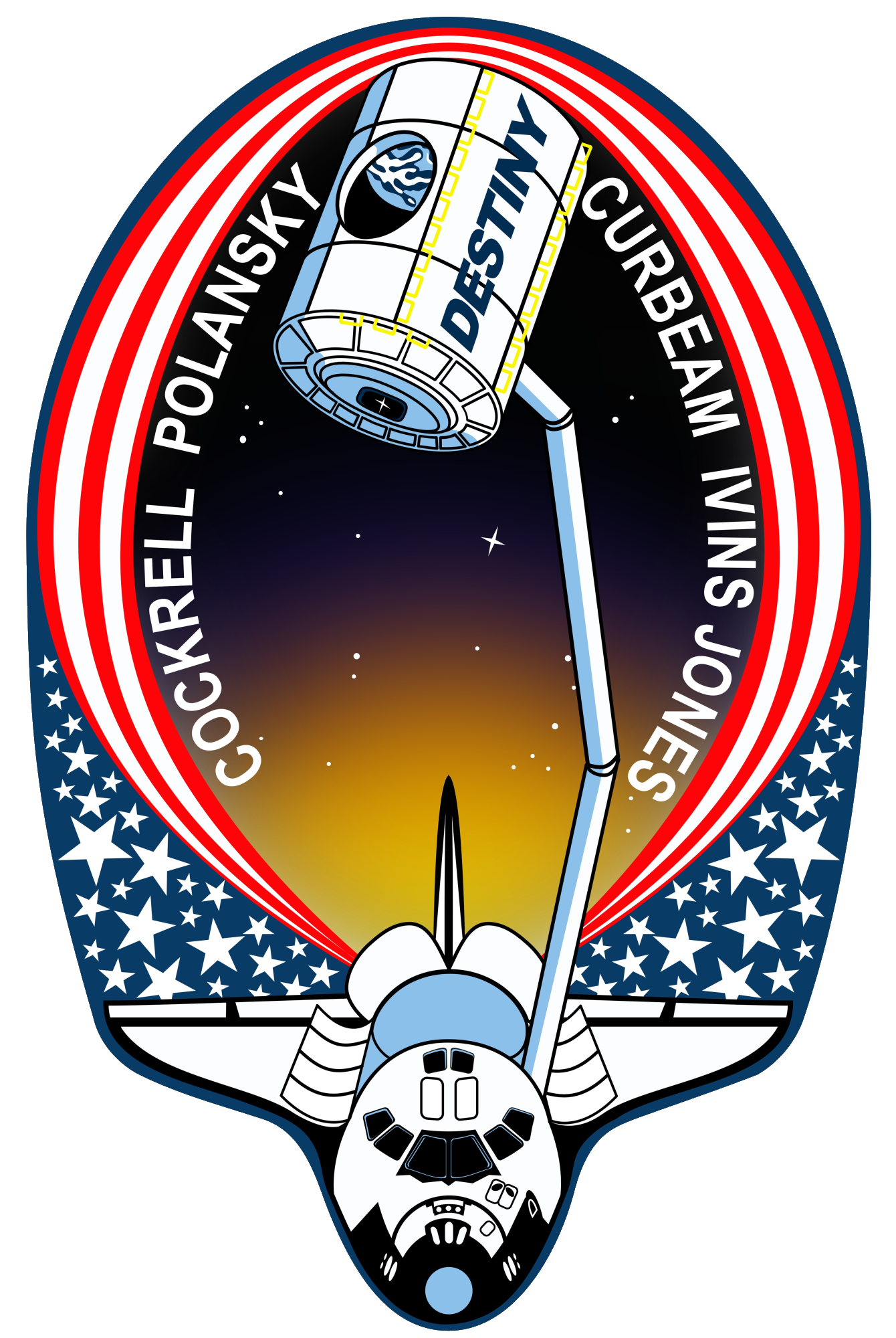
- Mission insignia

Thomas David Jones (born January 22, 1955) is a former United States astronaut. He was selected to the astronaut corps in 1990 and completed four Space Shuttle flights before retiring in 2001. He flew on STS-59 and STS-68 in 1994, STS-80 in 1996, and STS-98 in 2001. His total mission time was 53 days 48 minutes. He works as a planetary scientist, space operations consultant, astronaut speaker, and author.

== Early life and education ==
Jones was born January 22, 1955, in Baltimore, Maryland. He graduated from Kenwood High School in Essex, Maryland, in 1973; he received a Bachelor of Science degree in Basic Sciences from the United States Air Force Academy in 1977, and a Doctorate in Planetary Science from the University of Arizona in 1988. Jones is a Distinguished Eagle Scout.

== Career ==
A distinguished graduate of the USAF Academy, Jones served on active duty as an Air Force officer for six years. After pilot training in Oklahoma, he flew strategic bombers at Carswell Air Force Base, Texas. As pilot and aircraft commander of a B-52 D Stratofortress, he led a combat crew of six, accumulating over 2,000 hours of jet experience before resigning as a captain in 1983.

From 1983 to 1988, Jones worked toward a Ph.D. at the University of Arizona in Tucson. His research interests included the remote sensing of asteroids, meteorite spectroscopy, and applications of space resources. From 1989 to 1990, he was a program management engineer in Washington, D.C., at the CIA's Office of Development and Engineering. In 1990 he joined Science Applications International Corporation in Washington, D.C. as a senior scientist. Jones performed advanced program planning for NASA's Solar System Exploration Division, investigating future robotic missions to Mars, asteroids, and the outer Solar System.

After a year of training following his selection by NASA in January 1990, Jones became an astronaut in July 1991. In 1994 he flew as a mission specialist on successive flights of Space Shuttle Endeavour. In April 1994, he ran science operations on the "night shift" during STS-59, the first flight of the Space Radar Laboratory (SRL-1). Then, in October 1994, he was the payload commander on the SRL-2 mission, STS-68. As a Roman Catholic, Jones carried a consecrated host in a pyx for a brief communion service with two other Endeavour crew members in 1994. Jones next flew in late 1996 on Space Shuttle Columbia. STS-80 successfully deployed and retrieved 2 science satellites, ORFEUS/SPAS and the Wake Shield Facility. While helping set a Shuttle endurance record of nearly 18 days in orbit, Jones used Columbia's robot arm to release the Wake Shield satellite and later grapple it from orbit. His latest space flight was aboard Space Shuttle Atlantis on STS-98, in February 2001. Jones and his crew delivered the Destiny module to the International Space Station, (ISS) and he helped install the Lab in a series of three spacewalks lasting over 19 hours. The successful addition of Destiny gave the first Expedition Crew the largest space outpost in history and marked the start of onboard scientific research at the ISS. A veteran of four space flights, Jones has logged over 52 days (1,272 hours) in space.

Since leaving NASA in 2001, Jones has worked as a planetary scientist and consultant in space operations. He is a senior research scientist at the Florida Institute for Human and Machine Cognition, engaged in planning robotic and astronaut expeditions to deep space and the near-Earth asteroids. He is also an author and speaker, with four adult, non-fiction works to his credit. From 2006 to 2009 he served on the NASA Advisory Council. He is a board member of the Astronauts Memorial Foundation.

He appears frequently as a science/space commentator on radio and television.

== Awards and decorations ==
Jones's awards include the NASA Space Flight Medal (four awards), NASA Distinguished Service Medal, NASA Exceptional Service Award, NASA Exceptional Public Service Medal, and NASA Outstanding Leadership Medal. His military decorations include the Air Force Commendation Medal. He was a distinguished graduate and the outstanding graduate in Basic Sciences at the United States Air Force Academy. King's College in Wilkes-Barre, Penn. awarded him an honorary doctoral degree in 2007. The Main Belt asteroid 10828 Tomjones is named in his honor.

Jones's 2006 book Sky Walking: An Astronaut's Memoir, was named one of the top five books on the subject of space by the Wall Street Journal.

Jones was inducted into the United States Astronaut Hall of Fame on April 21, 2018.

== Bibliography ==
=== Books ===
- Space Shuttle Stories: Firsthand Astronaut Accounts from All 135 Missions by Tom Jones and Wayne Hale. Smithsonian Books, 2023. ISBN 1-5883-4754-0.
- Ask the Astronaut: A Galaxy of Astonishing Answers to Your Questions about Spaceflight by Tom Jones. Smithsonian Books, 2016.
- Planetology: Unlocking the Secrets of the Solar System by Tom Jones and Ellen Stofan, National Geographic, 2008.
- Hell Hawks! The Untold Story of the American Fliers Who Savaged Hitler's Wehrmacht by Thomas D. Jones and Robert F. Dorr. ISBN 0-7603-2918-4. Zenith Press, May 2008.
- Sky Walking: An Astronaut's Memoir ISBN 0-06-085152-X. Smithsonian-Collins, 2006.
- The Complete Idiot's Guide to NASA by Thomas D. Jones and Michael Benson - 2002 - ISBN 0-02-864282-1
- Mission: Earth - Voyage to the Home Planet by Tom Jones and June English. ISBN 0-590-48571-7. Scholastic, April 1996.
- The Scholastic Encyclopedia of the U.S. at War by Thomas D. Jones and June English. ISBN 0-590-63421-6. Scholastic, 1998, 2003 (paperback).

=== Articles ===
- Evans, Diane L.; Stofan, Ellen R.; Jones, Thomas D.; Godwin, Linda M. (December 1994). "Earth From Sky: Radar Systems Carried Aloft by the Space Shuttle Endeavour Provide a New Perspective of the Earth's Environment". Scientific American. 271 (6): 44–49. Bibcode:1994SciAm.271d..44W. doi:10.1038/scientificamerican1094-44.
