= STS-80 =

1996 American crewed spaceflight and longest duration Space Shuttle mission

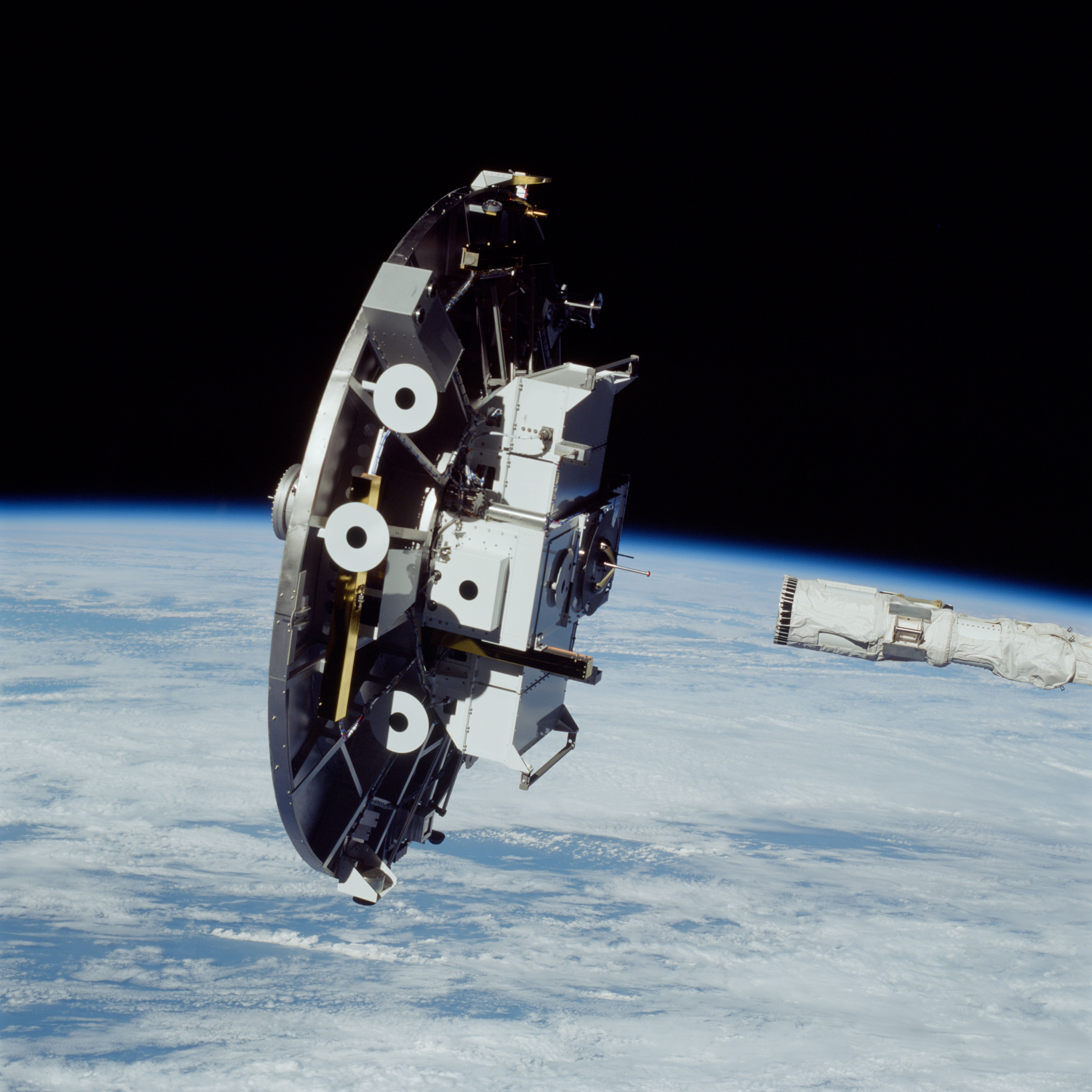
- The Wake Shield Facility takes flight for a third time, after being deployed by Columbia's Canadarm
- Mission type: Research
- Operator: NASA
- COSPAR ID: 1996-065A
- SATCAT no.: 24660
- Mission duration: 17 days, 15 hours, 53 minutes, 17 seconds
- Distance travelled: 11,000,000 km (6,800,000 mi)
- Orbits completed: 279

Spacecraft properties
- Spacecraft: Space Shuttle Columbia
- Payload mass: 13,006 kg (28,673 lb)

Crew
- Crew size: 5
- Members: Kenneth D. Cockrell; Kent Rominger; Story Musgrave; Thomas David Jones; Tamara E. Jernigan

Start of mission
- Launch date: November 19, 1996, 19:55:47 UTC (2:55:47 pm EST)
- Launch site: Kennedy, LC-39B

End of mission
- Landing date: December 7, 1996, 11:49:04 UTC (6:49:04 am EST)
- Landing site: Kennedy, SLF Runway 33

Orbital parameters
- Reference system: Geocentric
- Regime: Low Earth
- Perigee altitude: 318 kilometres (198 mi)
- Apogee altitude: 375 kilometres (233 mi)
- Inclination: 28.45 degrees
- Period: 91.5 min
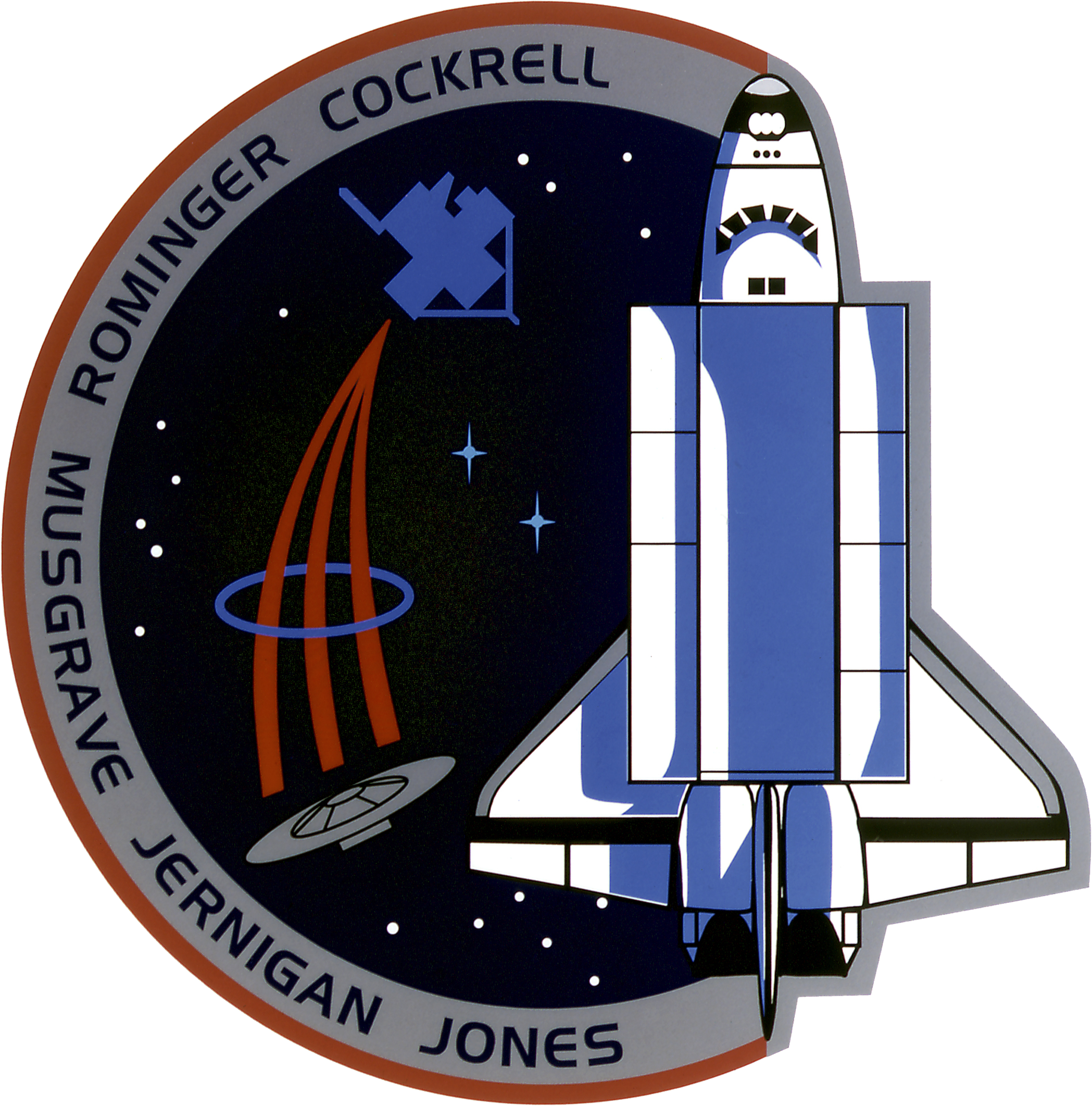
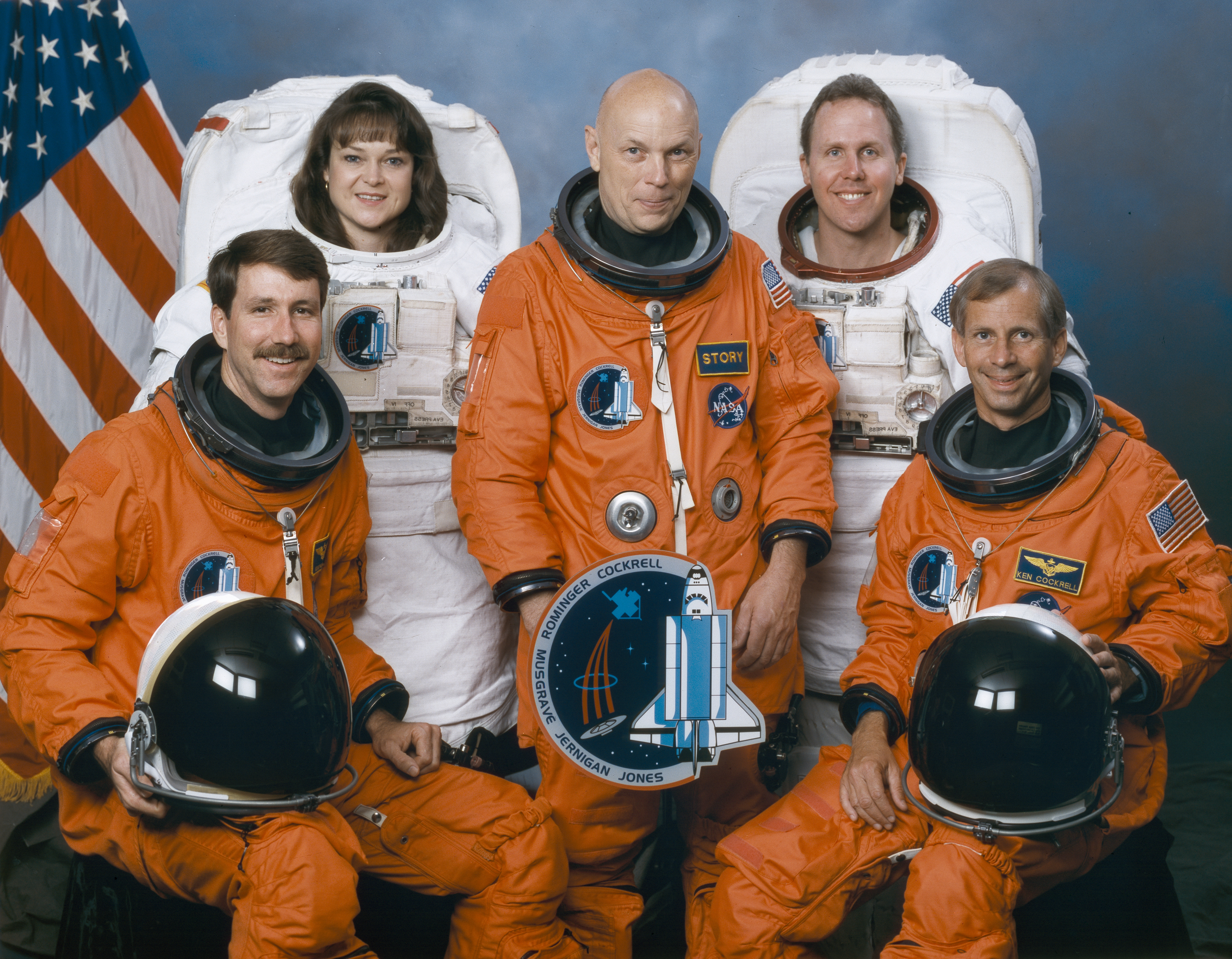
- From left: Rominger, Jernigan, Musgrave, Jones and Cockrell Space Shuttle program

STS-80 was a Space Shuttle mission flown by Space Shuttle Columbia. The launch was originally scheduled for October 31, 1996, but was delayed to November 19 for several reasons. Likewise, the landing, which was originally scheduled for December 5, was pushed back to December 7 after bad weather prevented landing for two days.

It was the longest Shuttle mission ever flown at 17 days, 15 hours, and 53 minutes.

Although two spacewalks were planned for the mission, they were both canceled after problems with the airlock hatch prevented astronauts Tom Jones and Tammy Jernigan from exiting the orbiter.

== Crew ==
Position	Astronaut
Commander	Kenneth D. Cockrell; Third spaceflight
Pilot	Kent V. Rominger; Second spaceflight
Mission Specialist 1	F. Story Musgrave; Sixth and last spaceflight
Mission Specialist 2 Flight Engineer	Thomas D. Jones; Third spaceflight
Mission Specialist 3	Tamara E. Jernigan; Fourth spaceflight

=== Crew seat assignments ===
Seat	Launch	Landing	Seats 1–4 are on the flight deck. Seats 5–7 are on the mid-deck.
1	Cockrell		Seats 1–4 are on the flight deck. Seats 5–7 are on the mid-deck.
2	Rominger		Seats 1–4 are on the flight deck. Seats 5–7 are on the mid-deck.
3	Musgrave	Jernigan	Seats 1–4 are on the flight deck. Seats 5–7 are on the mid-deck.
4	Jones		Seats 1–4 are on the flight deck. Seats 5–7 are on the mid-deck.
5	Jernigan	Musgrave †	Seats 1–4 are on the flight deck. Seats 5–7 are on the mid-deck.
6	Unused		Seats 1–4 are on the flight deck. Seats 5–7 are on the mid-deck.
7	Unused		Seats 1–4 are on the flight deck. Seats 5–7 are on the mid-deck.

† Musgrave was supposed to sit in Seat 5 during landing, however, he actually stood on the flight deck behind Cockrell in Seat 1 throughout re-entry and landing to film the spacecraft's reentry through the overhead windows.

== Mission highlights ==
- The mission deployed two satellites and successfully recovered them after they had performed their tasks.
- Orbiting and Retrievable Far and Extreme Ultraviolet Spectrometer-Shuttle Pallet Satellite II (ORFEUS-SPAS II) was deployed on flight day one. It was captured on flight day sixteen.
- The Wake Shield Facility-3 was deployed on flight day 4, and was recaptured three days later.
- The mission was the longest mission in Space Shuttle history.
- On this mission, Story Musgrave became the only person to fly on all five Space Shuttles orbiter vehicles—Challenger, Atlantis, Discovery, Endeavour, and Columbia.
- Musgrave also tied a record for spaceflights, and set a record for being the oldest man in space. Both records have since been surpassed.
- Two spacewalks were planned for the mission but were canceled after astronauts Tom Jones and Tammy Jernigan discovered the outer hatch of the airlock was jammed. The jam was attributed to a loose screw that may have fell during its installation.

== Mission payload ==
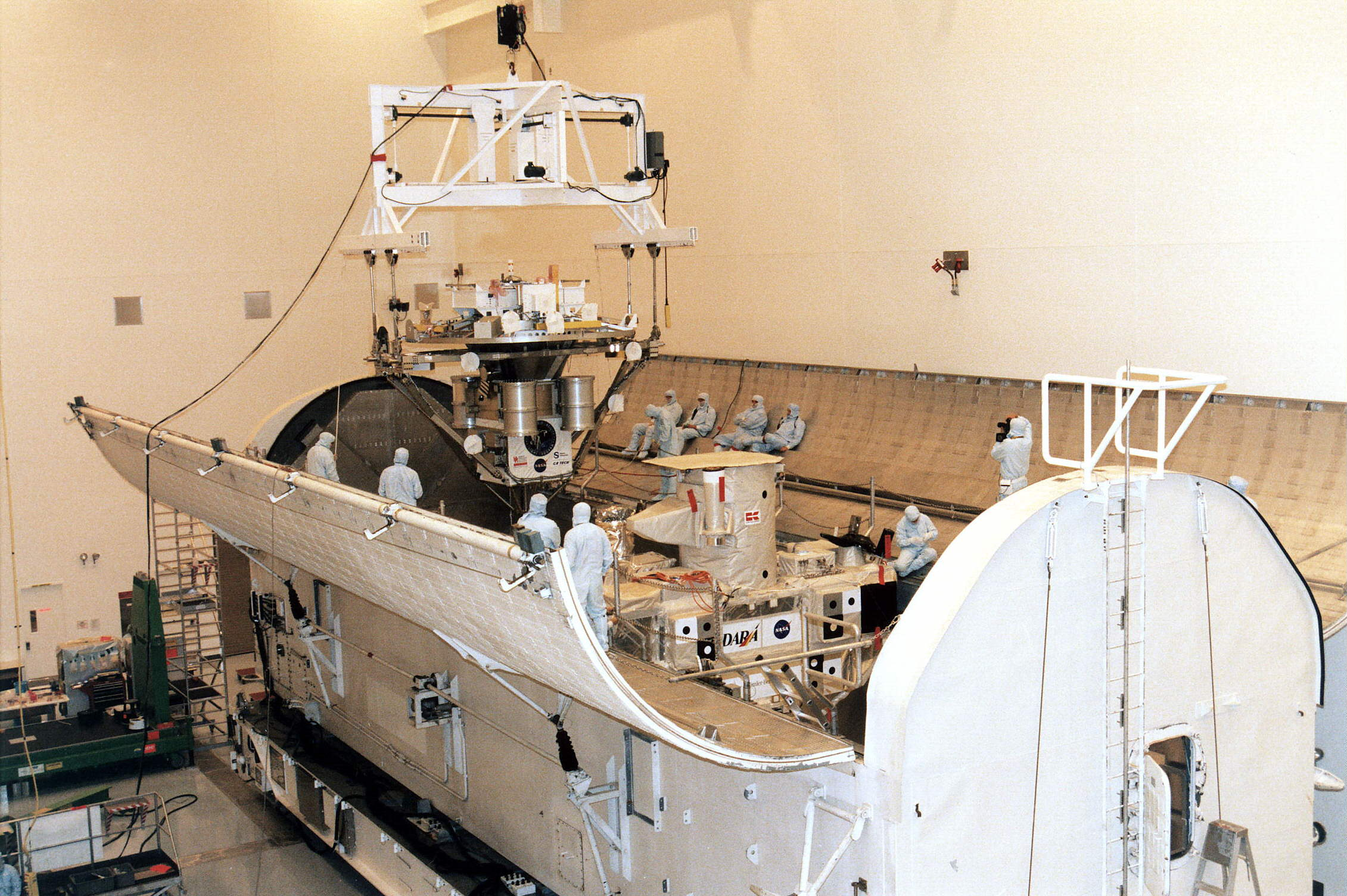
The payload being prepared for launch in a transfer container. Visible is the WSF-3 (being lowered in), and ORFEUS-SPAS II (Already in place)

Columbia brought with it two free floating satellites, both of which were on repeat visits to space. Also, a variety of equipment to be tested on two planned spacewalks was part of the payload. These would have been used to prepare for construction of the International Space Station. Included in the Shuttle's payload were:

- Orbiting and Retrievable Far and Extreme Ultraviolet Spectrometer-Shuttle Pallet Satellite II (ORFEUS-SPAS II)
  - Far Ultraviolet (FUV) Spectrograph
  - Extreme Ultraviolet (EUV) Spectrograph
  - Interstellar Medium Absorption Profile Spectrograph (IMAPS)
  - Surface Effects Sample Monitor (SESAM)
  - ATV Rendezvous Pre-Development Project (ARP)
  - Student Experiment on ASTRO-SPAS (SEAS)
- Wake Shield Facility (WSF-3)
- NIH-R4
- Space Experiment Module (SEM)
- EVA Development Flight Tests (EDTF-5)
  - Crane
  - Battery Orbital Replacement Unit
  - Cable Caddy
  - Portable Work Platform
    - Portable Foot Restraint Work Station (PFRWS)
    - Temporary Equipment Restraint Aid (TERA)
    - Articulating Portable Foot Restraint
  - Body Restraint Tether (BRT)
  - Multi-Use Tether (MUT)
- Visualization in an Experimental Water Capillary pumped Loop (VIEW-CPL)
- Biological Research In Canister (BRIC)
- Commercial Materials Dispersion Apparatus Instrumentation Technology Associates Experiment (CCM-A) (formerly STL/NIH-C-6)
  - Commercial MDA ITA Experiment (CMIX-5)

== Scientific projects ==
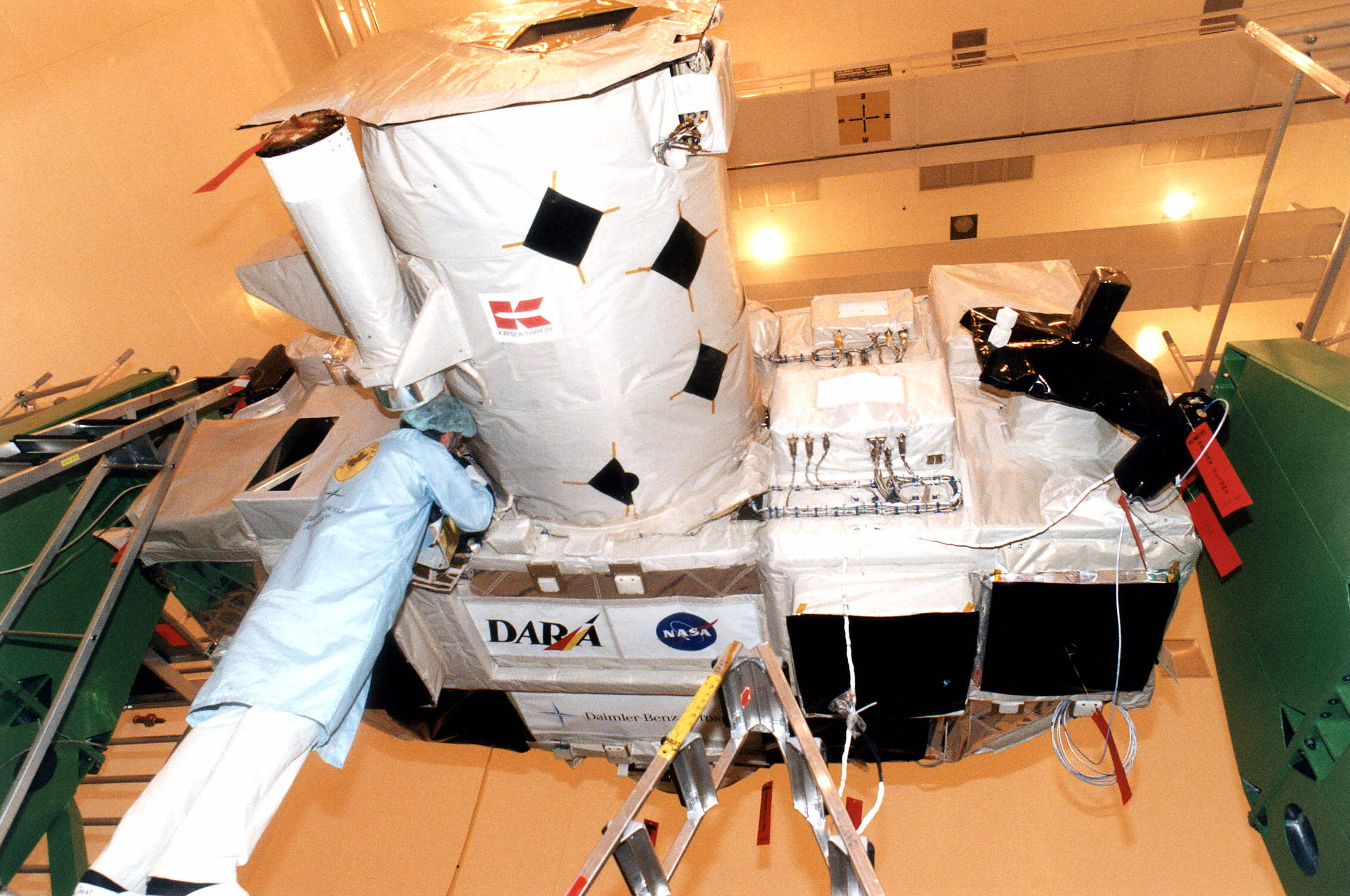
The ORFEUS SPAS is prepared for launch

Columbia carried into orbit two satellites that were released and recaptured after some time alone. The first was the Orbiting and Retrievable Far and Extreme Ultraviolet Spectrometer-Shuttle Pallet Satellite II (ORFEUS-SPAS II). The main component of the satellite, the ORFEUS telescope, had two spectrographs, for far and extreme ultraviolet.

Another spectrograph, the Interstellar Medium Absorption Profile Spectrograph, was also on board the satellite. Several payloads not relevant to astronomy rounded out the satellite. It performed without problems for its flight, taking 422 observations of almost 150 astronomical bodies, ranging from the Moon to extra-galactic stars and a quasar. Being the second flight of ORFEUS-SPAS II allowed for more sensitive equipment, causing it to provide more than twice the data of its initial run.

Also deployed from Columbia was the Wake-Shield Facility (WSF), a satellite that created an ultra-vacuum behind it, allowing for the creation of semiconductor thin films for use in advanced electronics. WSF created seven films before being recaptured by Columbia's robotic arm after three days of flight. The 12-foot-diameter (3.7 m) craft was on its third mission, including STS-60, when hardware problems prevented it from deploying off the robotic arm. Wake Shield was designed and built by the Space Vacuum Epitaxy Center at the University of Houston in conjunction with its industrial partner, Space Industries, Inc.

Another inclusion was a Space Experiment Module (SEM). The SEM included student research projects selected to fly into space. This was the first flight of the program. Among the experiments conducted were analysis of bacteria growth on food in orbit, crystal growth in space, and microgravity's effect on a pendulum.

NIH.R4 was an experiment conducted for the National Institute of Health and Oregon Health Sciences University. It was designed to test the effects of spaceflight on circulation and vascular constriction. Biological Research in Canister (BRIC) explored gravity's effects on tobacco and tomato seedlings. Visualization in an Experimental Water Capillary Pumped Loop (VIEW-CPL) was conducted to test a new idea in thermal spacecraft management. The Commercial MDA ITA Experiment were a variety of experiments submitted by high school and middle school students sponsored by Information Technology Associates.

== Mission background ==
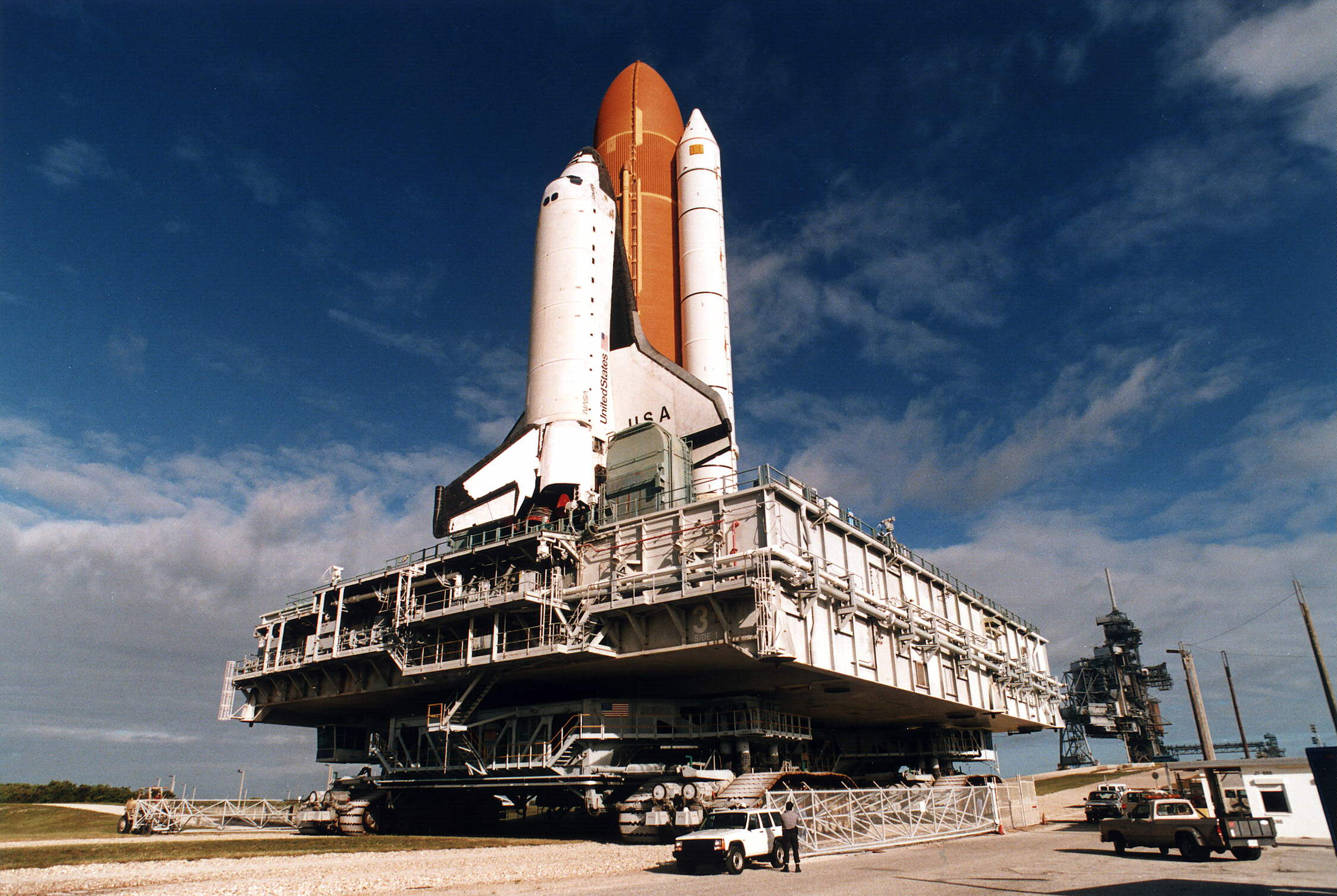
Columbia is rolled out to launch pad 39B

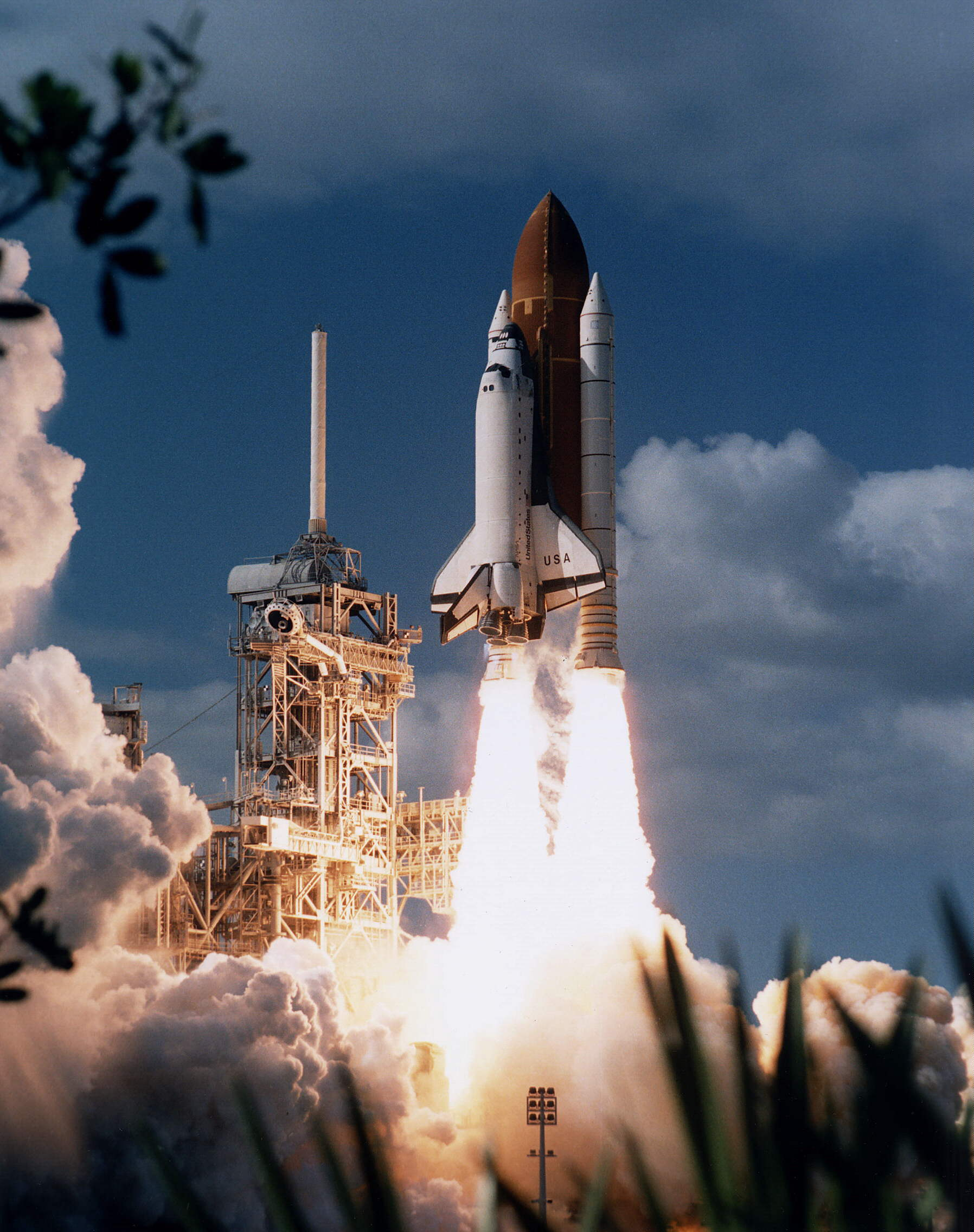
Launch of STS-80

Attempt	Planned	Result	Turnaround	Reason	Decision point	Weather go (%)	Notes
1	15 Nov 1996, 2:50:00 pm	Scrubbed	—	Weather	13 Nov 1996, 11:36 am (T−19:00:00 hold)	10	High winds at KSC.
2	19 Nov 1996, 2:55:47 pm	Success	4 days 0 hours 6 minutes			80	Countdown clock held at T−31 seconds to measure hydrogen gas.

Astronauts were selected for the mission on January 17, 1996. Stacking of the Solid Rocket Boosters (SRBs) began September 9, 1996. On September 18, the launch date was bumped back from no earlier than (NET) October 31 to November 8. Payload doors were closed on September 25. The following day, the External fuel tank was mated to the SRBs inside the Vehicle Assembly Building.

Further progress was delayed while two windows on the orbiter were replaced; NASA feared that they might be susceptible to breakage after seven and eight flights. Columbia was rolled over to the VAB on October 9 to begin final assembly preparations.

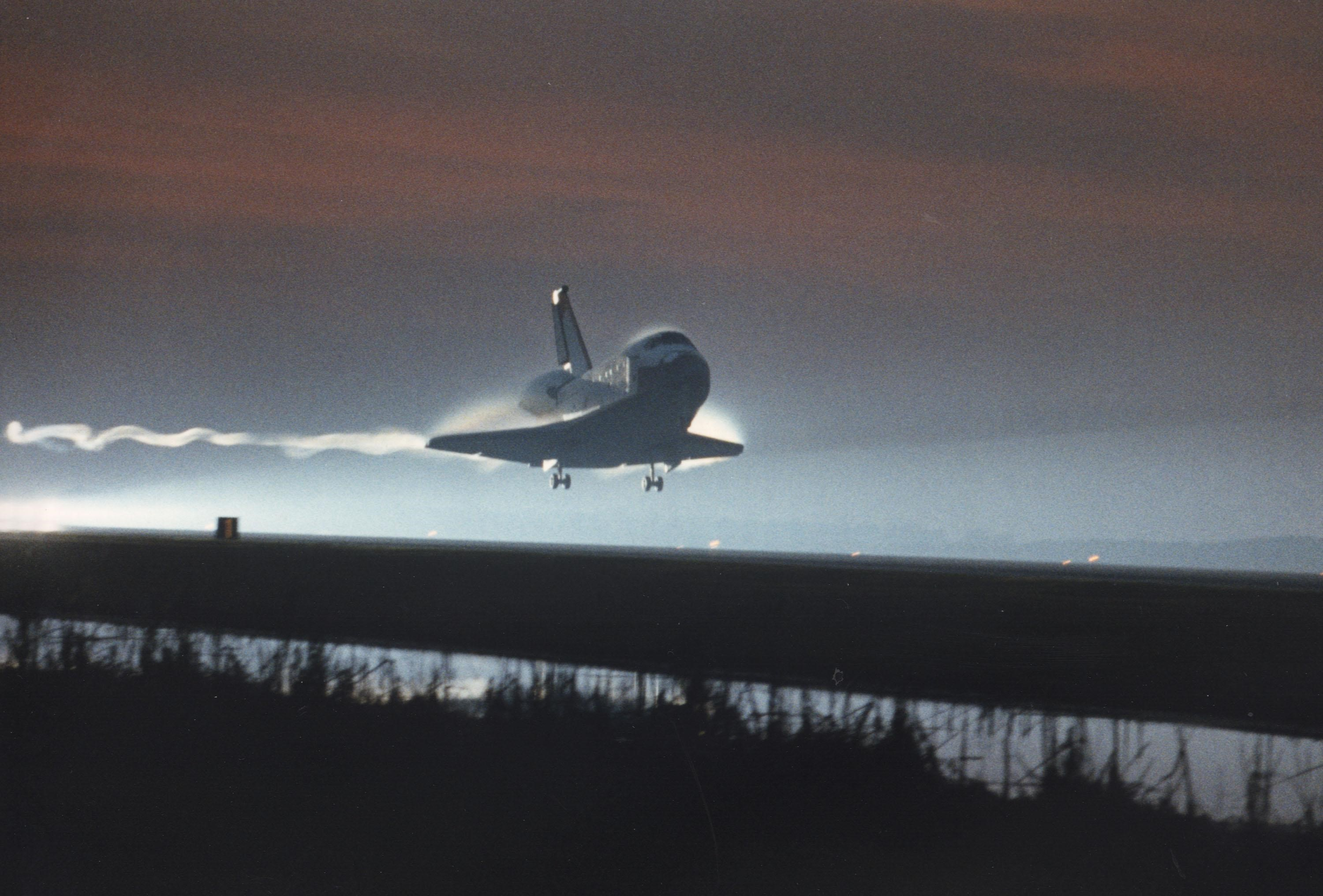
STS-80 Landing

On October 11, Columbia was mated with the external fuel tank, and the payload was delivered and transferred. Rollout to Pad 39B occurred on October 16, which was followed by flight readiness checks of the main propulsion system.

After a Flight Readiness Review on October 28, an additional FRR was requested to further analyze the Redesigned Solid Rocket Motor (RSRM) due to nozzle erosion that occurred on STS-79; on the 29th, a fuel pump failed, delaying the fueling process of Columbia. The erosion problem led to a week long delay instituted on November 4. A launch date of November 15 was set, contingent on a successful Atlas launch two days prior. The forecast of bad weather pushed the launch back even further, to a date of November 19.

During landing, Jones planned to use a video camera to capture footage of the plasma tube trailing behind the orbiter from the overhead windows. He asked Musgrave to assist with the recording, with the expectation that he would take his seat on the mid-deck once the orbiter reached entry interface. Instead, Musgrave elected to remain standing on the flight deck behind Commander Cockrell (in Seat 1) throughout re-entry and landing. Jones estimated that the 61-year-old Musgrave would have experienced 1.7 times the normal force of Earth's gravity for five to ten continuous minutes after 18 days of near weightlessness.

== Wake-up calls ==
NASA began a tradition of playing music to astronauts during the Gemini program, which was first used to wake up a flight crew during Apollo 15. Each track is specially chosen, often by their families, and usually has a special meaning to an individual member of the crew, or is applicable to their daily activities.

Flight Day	Song	Artist/Composer
Day 2	"I Can See For Miles"	The Who
Day 3	"Theme From Fireball XL5"	Barry Gray
Day 4	"Roll With the Changes"	REO Speedwagon
Day 5	"Reelin' and Rockin'"	Chuck Berry
Day 6	"Roll with It"	Steve Winwood
Day 7	"Good Times Roll"	The Cars
Day 8	"Red Rubber Ball"	Cyrkle
Day 9	"Alice's Restaurant"	Arlo Guthrie
Day 10	"Some Guys Have All the Luck"	Robert Palmer
Day 11	"Changes"	David Bowie
Day 12	"Break on Through (To the Other Side)"	The Doors
Day 13	"Shooting Star"	Bad Company
Day 14	"Stay"	Jackson Browne
Day 15	"Return to Sender"	Elvis Presley
Day 16	"Should I Stay or Should I Go"	The Clash
Day 17	"Nobody Does It Better"	Carly Simon
Day 18	"Please Come Home for Christmas"	Sawyer Brown

== See also ==
- List of human spaceflights
- List of Space Shuttle missions
- Outline of space science
- STS-78 (16 day 21 hour Shuttle mission)
- STS-67 (16 days 15 hour Shuttle mission)
- STS-73 (15 days 21 hours Shuttle mission)
