= Margaret Mary Ray =

American stalker (1952–1998)

- Born: 1952; Illinois, U.S.
- Died: October 5, 1998 (aged 46); Hotchkiss, Colorado, U.S.
- Cause of death: Suicide
- Other name: Peggy Ray
- Education: Marquette University
- Known for: Stalking David Letterman and Story Musgrave
- Spouse: Gary Johanson (m. 1972–1982)
- Children: 5

Margaret Mary "Peggy" Ray (1952 – October 5, 1998) was an American woman who had schizophrenia and erotomania. She received much media attention for stalking talk show host David Letterman and retired astronaut Story Musgrave.

== Early life ==
Ray was the second of four children born to George and Loretta Ray in Illinois. She attended Grayslake Community High in Grayslake, Illinois where she was a popular honor student. After graduating in 1970, Ray briefly enrolled in a nursing program at Marquette University. She dropped out during her sophomore year to marry her first husband, Gary Johanson, with whom she eventually had four children. When Ray was in her early 20s, she began showing signs of schizophrenia. Two of her brothers, Bill and David, also had schizophrenia which began manifesting when both were in their early 20s. Bill committed suicide by driving his car into a tree in 1973 while David died of intentional carbon monoxide poisoning in 1977. Ray's mother, Loretta, later revealed that her father, George, was treated for schizophrenia before their marriage and was an alcoholic.

By 1982, Ray's marriage to Gary Johanson ended in divorce. Her mental health continued to decline and her ex-husband was awarded custody of their four children. Sometime after her divorce, Ray married for a second time and had a fifth child, Alex, in 1984. Ray's friends and family attempted to get her professional help, but Ray refused and would frequently disappear for months at a time. Ray lived a transient life and would often hitchhike across the United States. When she was not living at the homes of various friends and family members, she would live in shanties. Around 1989, she relinquished custody of Alex to her mother.

== Stalking behavior ==
=== David Letterman ===
Ray first made the news in May 1988, when she was arrested at the Lincoln Tunnel for failing to pay the $3 toll. She was driving late-night talk show host David Letterman's Porsche, stolen from his driveway, with her three-year-old son Alex. She claimed she was Letterman's wife and that her son was their child. Over the next several years, she was arrested a total of eight times for trespassing on Letterman's property and other related counts. She claimed she left cookies and an empty Jack Daniel's bottle in the foyer of Letterman's Connecticut home. At one point, she was found sleeping near a tennis court on Letterman's property.

Ray's exploits became a staple of supermarket tabloids and Letterman himself publicly treated it as a joke. In 1993, before moving his late-night show from NBC to CBS, Letterman's "Top 10 things I have to do before I leave NBC" included, "Send change of address forms to that woman who breaks into my house." Another quip occurred on Letterman's first show on CBS, where he joked that because of his being on the air an hour earlier every day, Ray was breaking into his house that much earlier than normal. However, in an interview with Barbara Walters, Letterman noted he never mentioned Ray's name on the air, and said that he had great compassion for her, often declining to press criminal charges against her. "I wasn't comfortable with the humanity of that", he said.

Ray eventually served a total of 34 months in jail and psychiatric hospitals for stalking Letterman. During her jail and hospital stays, Ray was prescribed antipsychotic drugs to treat her schizophrenia, which improved her condition. She would stop taking them after her release because she did not like the physical side effects (weight gain and lethargy) and felt that she did not need the medication because she was not ill.

=== Story Musgrave ===
After she was released from jail in the early 1990s, Ray's attentions shifted to astronaut Story Musgrave, to whom she wrote letters, made telephone calls, and sent packages. In 1994, she posed as a reporter and interviewed him at the Johnson Space Center in Houston. In September 1997, she showed up at his home in Osceola County, Florida. She claimed she and Musgrave were writing a book together, stating "I love Dr. Musgrave. I would die for him. He is a man of integrity and intelligence." Ray eventually served time in a Florida jail for trespassing on Musgrave's property.

== Post-prison life and suicide ==
After her stint in jail, Ray was sent to a psychiatric hospital in Miami and prescribed Haldol, an antipsychotic drug. Her condition improved and she was released from the hospital in August 1998. Shortly after her release, Ray stopped taking Haldol. She settled in Hotchkiss, Colorado, living on Social Security disability benefits and performing odd jobs.

On October 5 that year, she took her own life by kneeling on the tracks in front of an oncoming Denver & Rio Grande Western Railroad train. In a letter that she wrote to her mother before her death, Ray said, "I'm all traveled out. I chose a painless and instantaneous way to end my life in the valley I loved." Ray's body was cremated and her family scattered her ashes in Needle Rock Natural Area near Crawford, Colorado. Musgrave publicly expressed sympathy upon her death, describing her as a "creative genius" and stating that he felt as if he had lost a relative. Letterman described her suicide as a "sad end to a confused life."

== See also ==
- Joe Halderman
