= Diane L. Evans =

Geo-scientist at NASA's Jet Propulsion Laboratory

- Education: University of Washington, Ph.D., 1981
- Known for: remote sensing, radar imaging
- Title: Director of the Earth Sciences and Technology Directorate
- Scientific career
- Fields: geology
- Workplaces: Jet Propulsion Laboratory
- Thesis: Identification of lithologic units using multichannel imaging systems

Diane L. Evans is a geologist and the former Director of Earth Science and Technology Directorate at NASA's Jet Propulsion Laboratory. Her research areas have included sea-level rise, climate change, and tectonics. In 2019, she was recognized by Congressman Adam Schiff for her contributions in his district.

== Education ==
Evans became interested in geology during a visit to Yellowstone National Park during the summer after her first year at Occidental College. She earned a bachelor's degree in geology from Occidental in 1976. She went on to earn a Ph.D. in geological sciences from the University of Washington in 1981.

== Career ==
Evans began work at NASA's Jet Propulsion Laboratory (JPL) in the 1980s, conducting research on Earth's geology using including in the Radar Sciences Group, including the SIR-C radar project, which was used to explore dry river beds and dangerous volcanoes. In addition to its primary geological mission, SIR-C supported archaeological imaging from space, including the discovery of long-buried portions of the Great Wall of China. She later served as deputy manager of the Science and Information Systems Office. She became the Director for the Earth Science and Technology Directorate as part of leadership changes that took place at JPL when Charles Elachi became the laboratory's director in 2001. Evans is the first woman to lead the directorate. As director, she is responsible for the development and implementation of JPL's Earth Sciences program. Under her direction, JPL has conducted research on climate change in coordination with Britains Met [Meteorology] Office, and is studying Earth's carbon cycle with the Orbiting Carbon Observatory 3 mission and its predecessors.

=== Selected publications ===
- Tralli, David M.; Blom, Ronald G.; Zlotnicki, Victor; Donnellan, Andrea; Evans, Diane L. (June 2005). "Satellite remote sensing of earthquake, volcano, flood, landslide and coastal inundation hazards". ISPRS Journal of Photogrammetry and Remote Sensing. 59 (4): 185–198. Bibcode:2005JPRS...59..185T. doi:10.1016/j.isprsjprs.2005.02.002.
- Evans, D.L.; Farr, T.G.; van Zyl, J.J.; Zebker, H.A. (November 1988). "Radar polarimetry: analysis tools and applications". IEEE Transactions on Geoscience and Remote Sensing. 26 (6): 774–789. Bibcode:1988ITGRS..26..774E. doi:10.1109/36.7709.
- Stofan, E.R.; Evans, D.L.; Schmullius, C.; Holt, B.; Plaut, J.J.; van Zyl, J.; Wall, S.D.; Way, J. (July 1995). "Overview of results of Spaceborne Imaging Radar-C, X-Band Synthetic Aperture Radar (SIR-C/X-SAR)". IEEE Transactions on Geoscience and Remote Sensing. 33 (4): 817–828. Bibcode:1995ITGRS..33..817S. doi:10.1109/36.406668.
