= Shuttle pallet satellite =

Part of NASA's Space Shuttle

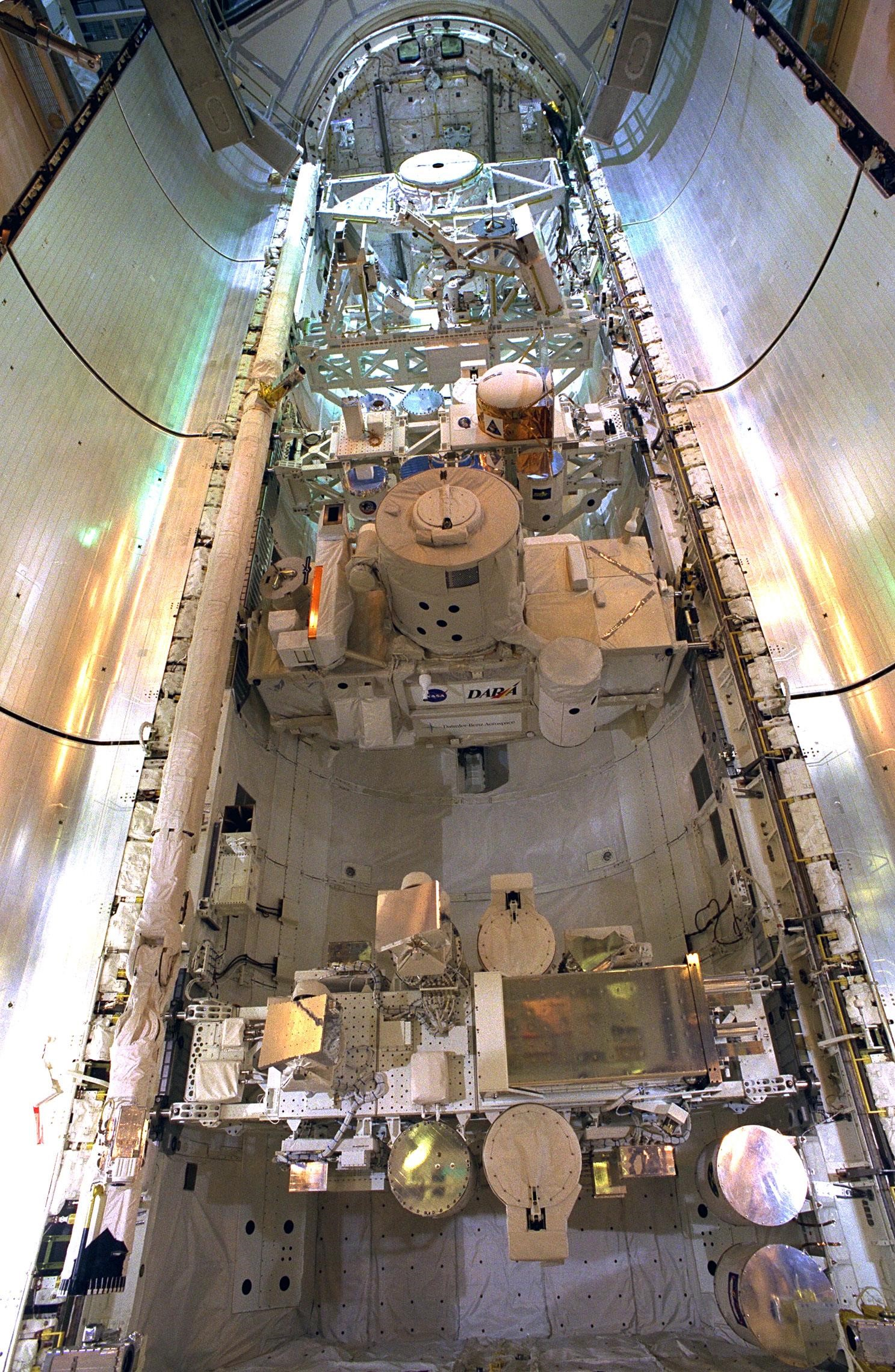
CRISTA-SPAS II in the payload bay of Space Shuttle Discovery before launch of the 1997 STS-85 mission

The shuttle pallet satellite was a satellite bus designed to be deployed and then retrieved for return to Earth on NASA's Space Shuttle. It carried a variety of payloads both scientific and military in nature.

It was made by Messerschmitt-Bölkow-Blohm and first flew in 1983. It was carried for the first time during the STS-7 mission and called SPAS-01 carrying 10 payloads. It flew again on the STS-39 mission in 1991 called IBSS-SPAS (Infrared Background Signature Survey – Shuttle Pallet Satellite) for the DOD testing various ballistic missile detection sensors.

SPAS flew for the third time with the STS-51 mission in 1991 called ORFEUS-SPAS (Orbiting & Retrievable Far & Extreme UV Spectrometer – Shuttle Pallet Satellite) with ultraviolet instruments. ORFEUS-SPAS was flown again on the STS-80 mission.

SPAS was flown for the second to last time with the CRISTA-SPAS (Cryogenic Infrared Spectrometers & Telescopes for the Atmosphere – Shuttle Pallet Satellite) payload on STS-66 in 1994 mounting several infrared sensors looking at the Earths atmosphere, and that payload flew again on STS-85 in 1997.

== Gallery ==
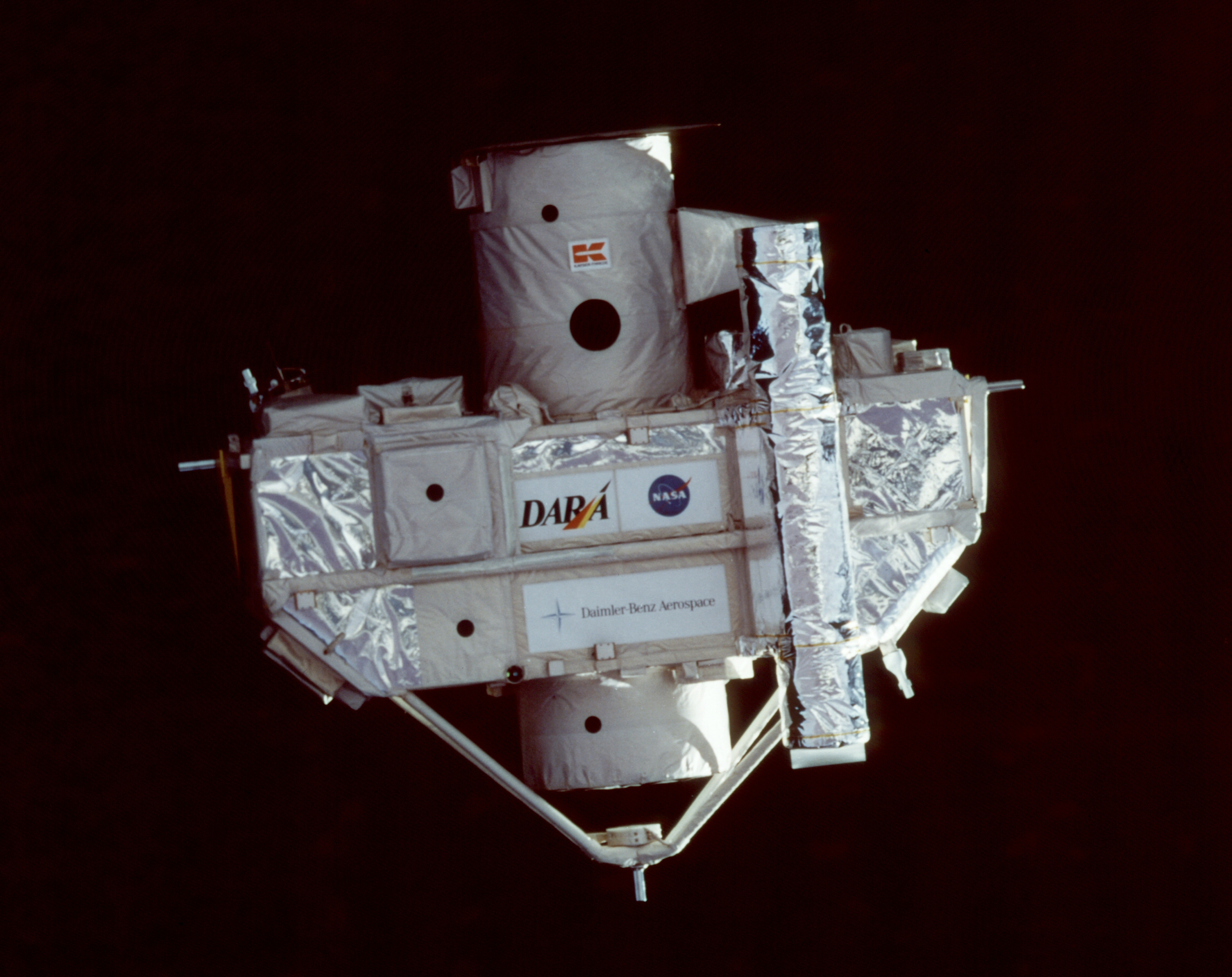
ORFEUS-SPAS II after being deployed from Columbia on STS-80

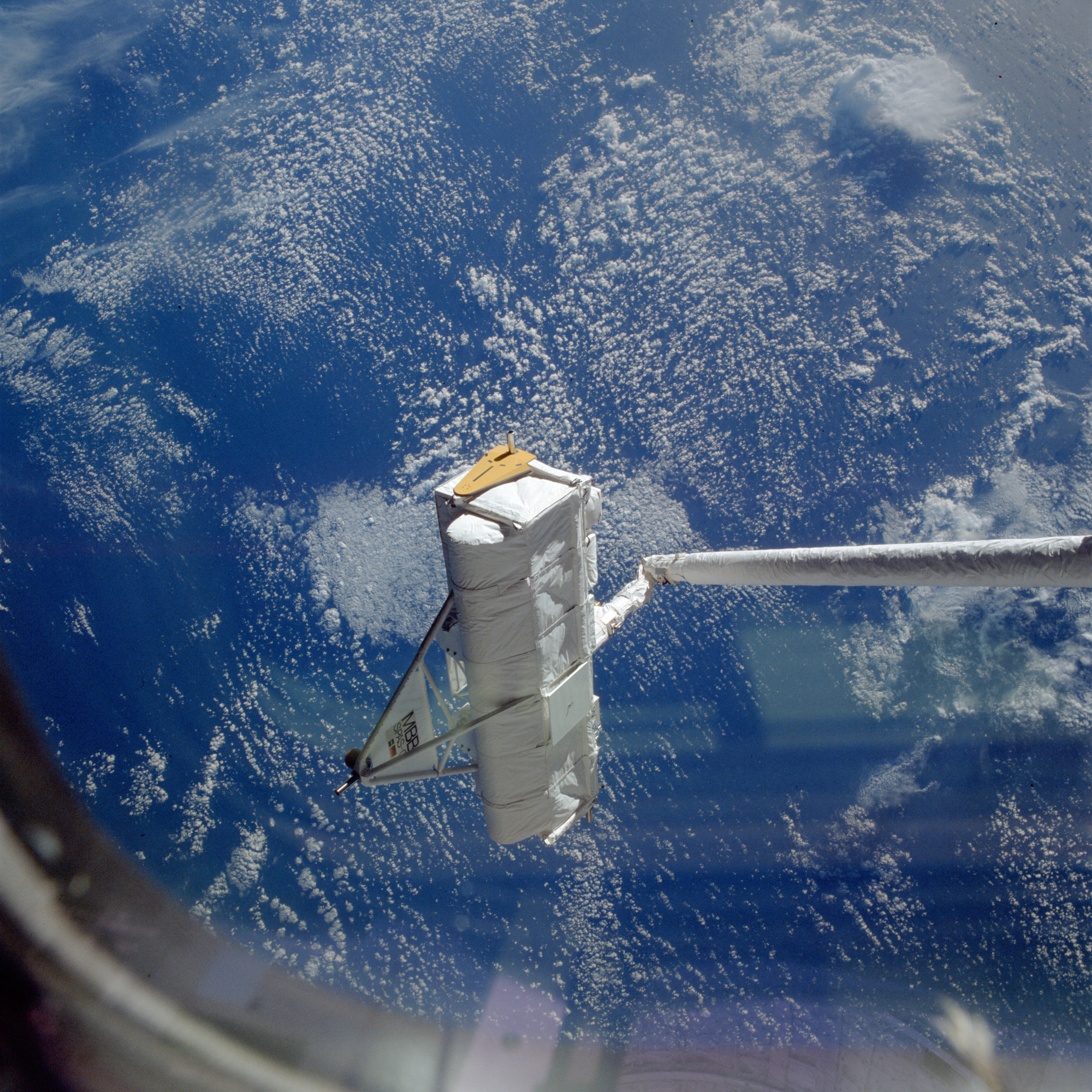
The first SPAS on the RMS of Challenger during the STS-7 mission

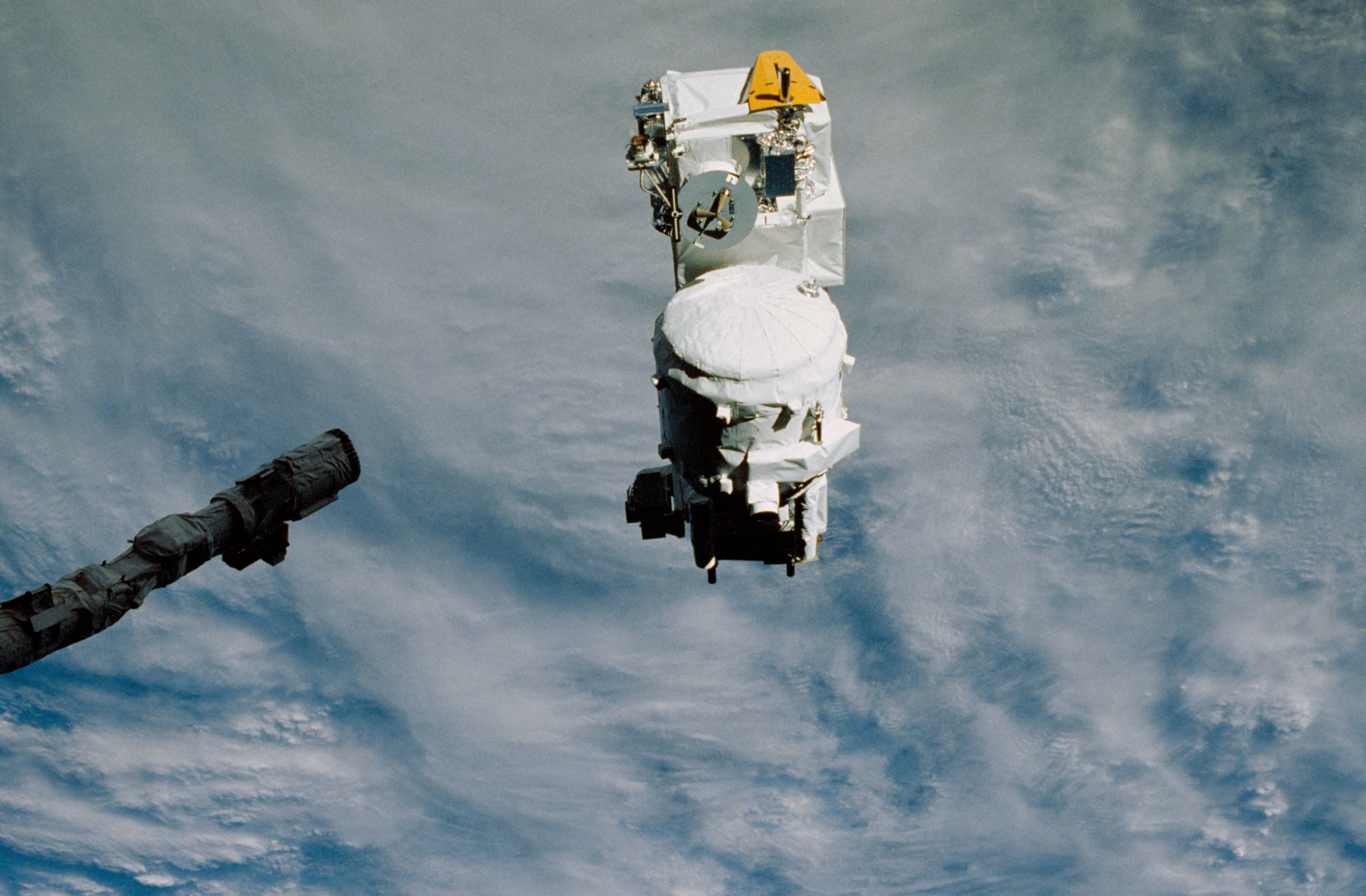
IBSS-SPAS after being deployed from Discovery's payload bay during the STS-39 mission

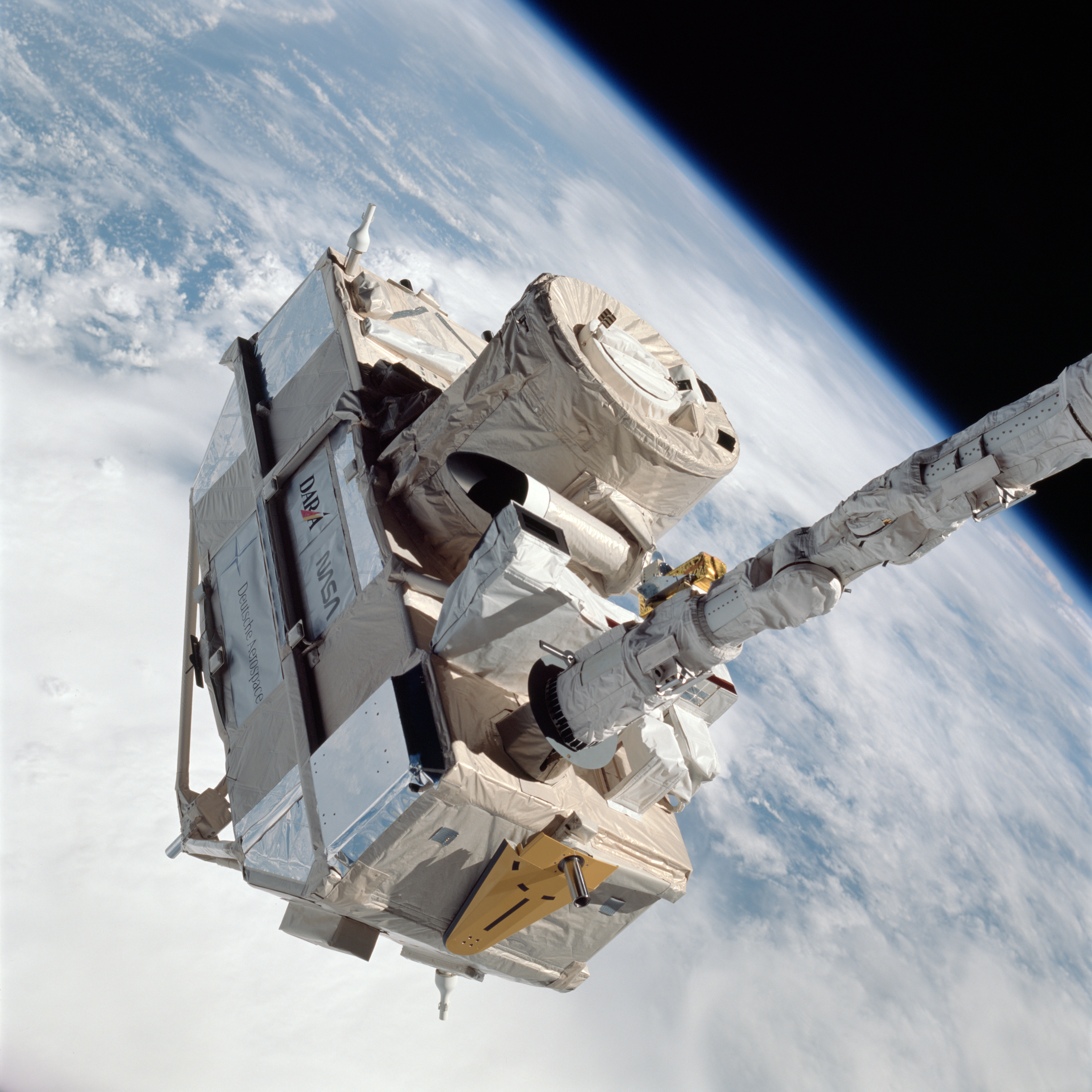
CRISTA-SPAS 1 on Atlantis' RMS before release on the STS-66 mission
