= Ronald M. Sega =

American astronaut and professor (born 1952)

Ron Sega
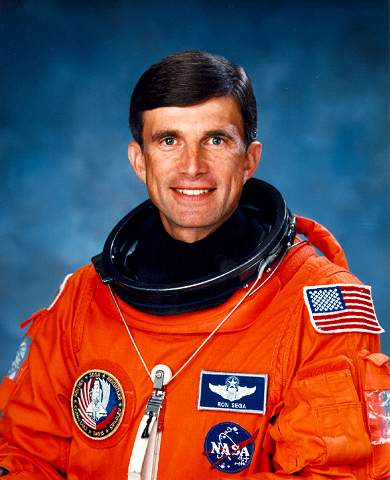
- Sega in early 1994
- Born: Ronald Michael Sega; December 4, 1952 (age 73); Cleveland, Ohio, U.S.
- Education: United States Air Force Academy (BS); Ohio State University (MS); University of Colorado Boulder (PhD)
- Spouse: Bonnie J. Dunbar (m. 1988, divorced)
- Space career

NASA astronaut
- Rank: Major General, USAF
- Time in space: 17d 12h 25m
- Selection: NASA Group 13 (1990)
- Missions: STS-60; STS-76

Ronald Michael Sega (born December 4, 1952) is an American former astronaut who is professor of systems engineering and Vice President for Energy and the Environment at the Colorado State University Research Foundation, a non-profit advocacy organization supporting CSU. He is also the Vice President and Enterprise Executive for Energy and Environment at Ohio State University. From August 2005 to August 2007, he served as Under Secretary of the Air Force. He is a retired major general in the United States Air Force and a former NASA astronaut. Sega was born in Cleveland, Ohio, he is of Slovene origin. He was married to fellow astronaut Bonnie J. Dunbar. He is now married to Ann Sega; they have two sons. He has lived in both Northfield, Ohio and Colorado Springs.

== Education ==
Sega graduated from Nordonia High School, Macedonia, Ohio, in 1970 after which he received a Bachelor of Science degree in mathematics and physics from the United States Air Force Academy in 1974, a Master of Science degree in physics from Ohio State University in 1975, and a doctorate in electrical engineering from University of Colorado Boulder in 1982.

== Career ==
Sega completed pilot training in 1976 and served as an Instructor Pilot at Williams Air Force Base, Arizona, until 1979. From 1979 to 1982 he was on the faculty of the United States Air Force Academy in the physics department where he designed and constructed a laboratory facility to investigate microwave fields using infrared techniques while pursuing a doctorate in electrical engineering. In 1982 he joined the faculty of the University of Colorado Colorado Springs as assistant professor in the Department of Electrical and Computer Engineering. He was promoted to associate professor in 1985, granted tenure in 1988, promoted to professor in 1990, and is currently on an extended leave of absence. From 1987 to 1988 he served as Technical Director, Lasers and Aerospace Mechanics Directorate, of the Frank J. Seiler Research Laboratory at the U.S. Air Force Academy. From 1989 to 1990, while on leave from the University of Colorado, he served as Research Associate Professor of Physics at the University of Houston, affiliated with the Space Vacuum Epitaxy Center, and is adjunct professor of physics. Sega is a co-principal investigator and mission director for the Wake Shield Facility (WSF) which has flown on Space Shuttle mission STS-60 in February 1994 and STS-76 in 1996. He has authored or co-authored over 100 technical publications.

As a pilot, Sega has logged over 4,000 hours in the Air Force, Air Force Reserves and NASA.

=== NASA career ===
Sega became an astronaut in July 1991 after selection in 1990. His technical assignments included:

- working Remote Manipulator System (RMS) issues for the Astronaut Office Mission Development Branch
- supporting Orbiter software verification in the Shuttle Avionics Integration Laboratory (SAIL)
- Chief of Astronaut Appearances
- Science Support Group Lead
- Space Station integration team
- Astronaut Representative to the Space Station Science and Utilization Advisory Board (primarily an external board for NASA).

From November 1994 to March 1995, Sega was the NASA Director of Operations, Star City, Russia (The Gagarin Cosmonaut Training Center) responsible for managing NASA activities at Star City. These activities involved building an organization and infrastructure to support astronaut and cosmonaut mission and science training for flight on the Russian Space Station Mir. He also participated in training on Russian Space Systems and was the first American to train in the Russian EVA suit (Orlan) in their underwater facility (Hydrolaboratory). A veteran of two space flights (STS-60 in 1994 and STS-76 in 1996), Sega logged over 420 hours in space.

==== Space flight experience ====
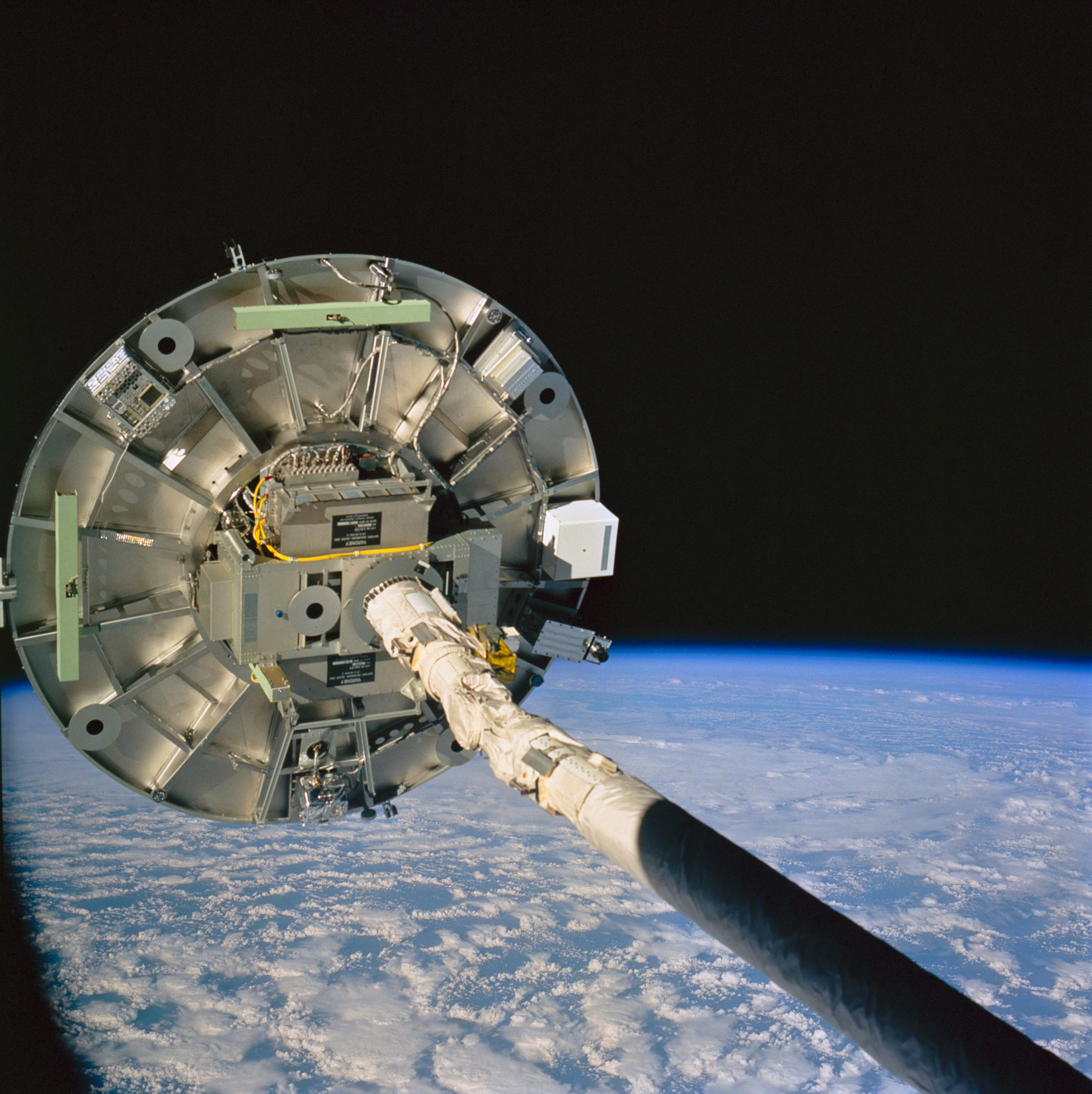
Sega was the flight engineer of STS-60, during which the Wake Shield Facility was deployed.

STS-60 was the first joint United States/Russian Space Shuttle mission. Launched on February 3, 1994, STS-60 was the second flight of the Space Habitation Module-2 (Spacehab-2), and the first flight of the Wake Shield Facility (WSF-1). During the 8-day flight, the crew of Discovery conducted a wide variety of biological, materials science, earth observation, and life science experiments. Sega was the flight engineer for ascent and entry on this mission, performed several experiments on orbit, and operated the robotic arm, berthing the Wake Shield onto its payload bay carrier on four separate occasions. Following 130 orbits of the Earth in 3,439,705 miles, STS-60 landed at Kennedy Space Center, Florida, on February 11, 1994. With the completion of his first space flight, Sega logged 8 days, 7 hours, 9 minutes in space.

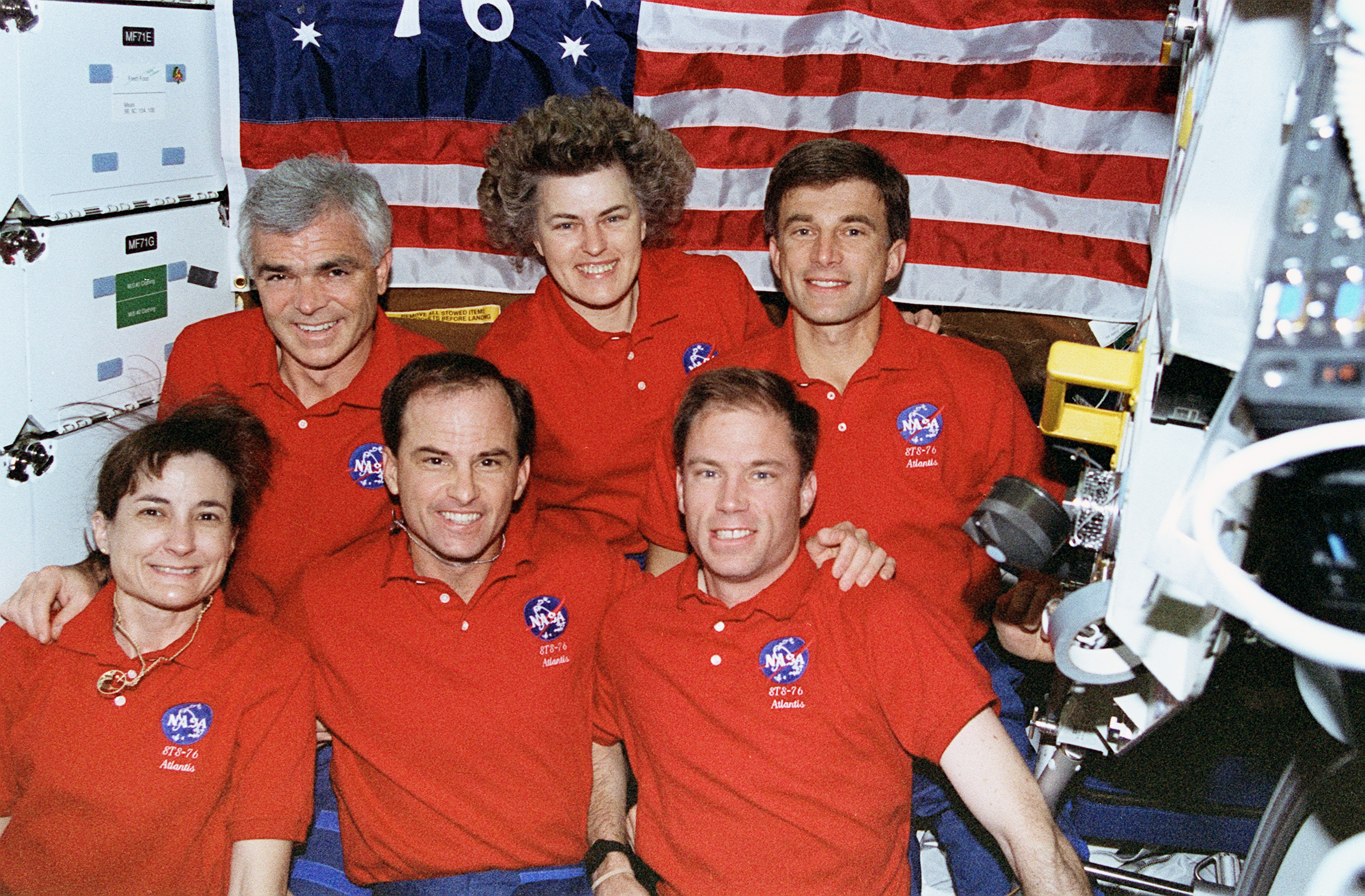
Sega (top right) with the crew of STS-76 aboard the Mir.

STS-76, the third docking mission to the Russian space station Mir, launched at night on March 22, 1996, with a crew of six aboard Atlantis. Following rendezvous and docking with Mir, a NASA astronaut transferred to Mir for a five-month stay to begin a continuous presence of U.S. astronauts aboard Mir for the next two years. Sega was the payload commander for this mission and lead on Biorack, a small multipurpose laboratory located in the Spacehab module carried in the Shuttle payload bay. Biorack was used to technology development, fundamental biology (research into plant and animal cellular function), and environment characterization. He was responsible for planning and on-orbit operations, including extensive transfer of logistics and science, including 4800 pounds of science and mission hardware, food, water and air to Mir, and returning over 1100 pounds of U.S. and European Space Agency science and Russian hardware. Following 144 orbits of the Earth, Atlantis landed with a crew of five at Edwards Air Force Base in California on March 31, 1996. Mission duration was 9 days, 5 hours, 15 minutes.

=== Post-NASA career ===
Sega left NASA on July 1, 1996, to become Dean of the College of Engineering and Applied Science, University of Colorado at Colorado Springs. In 2001, he became acting Assistant to the Secretary of Defense for Nuclear, Chemical and Biological Programs.

Sega served as Assistant Secretary of Defense for Research and Engineering, from August 2001 through August 2005.

The Defense Research and Engineering was made by Paul Wolfowitz the key compliance officer regarding, among others, the protection of human subjects in DoD supported research.

In the same period, he also served as the Reserve Assistant to the Chairman, Joint Chiefs of Staff JCS. According to the Senate Armed Services Committee Report of the Inquiry into the Treatment of Detainees in U.S. Custody, The Joint Chiefs were involved in the approval of the controversial interrogation program both the DoD and the CIA engaged.

In January 2004, during Sega's tenure as director, a DoD-wide review of human subjects protection policies was initiated by Defense Research and Engineering (DDR&E).

On November 14, 2006, A Navy presentation at a DoD Training Day said the review found the Navy "not in full compliance with Federal policies on human subjects protection." It was pointed out that the Navy had "no single point of accountability for human subject protections."

In 2005 he became Under Secretary of the Air Force, thus serving as Department of Defense Executive Agent and Milestone Decision Authority for Space. Starting in 2007, he worked at the Colorado State University, where Sega has "served as Vice President of Energy and the Environment for the Colorado State University Research Foundation, a private, non-profit advocacy organization for the university, and as the Woodward Professor of Systems Engineering in the College of Engineering". In September 2010, Colorado State University and The Ohio State University collaborated to create a shared position called the Vice President and Enterprise Executive for Energy and the Environment. In this position, Sega "will help the institutions work together to identify and lead potential national initiatives and economic development opportunities and will also look for opportunities for collaboration between the universities."

Sega currently serves as Professor and Director Emeritus in the Department of Systems Engineering at Colorado State University.

== Awards and honors ==
- Distinguished Graduate of the United States Air Force Academy, 1974
- Top Graduate of the Pilot Instructor Training Course, 1976
- Officer of the Year in the Department of Physics, U.S. Air Force Academy, 1980
- Meritorious Service Medal
- Commendation Medal
- USAF Reserve Achievement Medal
- Air Force Research Fellow — Air Force Office of Scientific Research, 1985.
- Received the Outstanding Faculty Award — Department of Electrical Engineering at the University of Colorado, 1985
- Selected to the Academic Hall of Fame of his high school in Macedonia, Ohio, 1988
- Reserve Officer of the Year (IMA), Air Force Space Command, 1988
- Reserve Officer of the Year (IMA), U.S. Air Force, 1988
- Received an honorary doctorate from Clarkson University, 1993
- NASA Space Flight Medals, 1994 and 1996
- NASA Superior Achievement Award - NASA Director of Operations, Russia, 1995
- NASA Outstanding Leadership Medal, 1997
- IEEE fellow for contributions to material research in space and regional engineering education, in 2002.
- Colorado Space Hall of Fame, on 7 October 2016
- Air Force Commander's Award for Public Service, 14 November 2016

=== Organizations ===
- American Institute of Aeronautics and Astronautics (AIAA) — Associate Fellow (1992)
- Institute of Electrical and Electronics Engineers (IEEE)
- American Physical Society (APS),
- Institute for the Advancement of Engineering — Fellow (1992)
- Society for Photo-Optical Instrumentation Engineers (SPIE)
- Air Force Reserve Officer Association
- Association of Space Explorers
- Eta Kappa Nu

Government offices
Preceded by Hans M. Mark	Director of Defense Research and Engineering; 2001–2005	Succeeded by John J. Young, Jr.
Preceded by Peter B. Teets	United States Under Secretary of the Air Force; 2005 – 2007	Succeeded by Vacant 2007-2010; Erin C. Conaton
