= SVEC =

SVEC or Svec may refer to:

- Studies on Voltaire and the Eighteenth Century
- Space Vacuum Epitaxy Center
- Švec, a Czech surname
- Sequachee Valley Electric Co-operative
