= List of Space Shuttle missions =

NASA flights of the partially reusable spacecraft

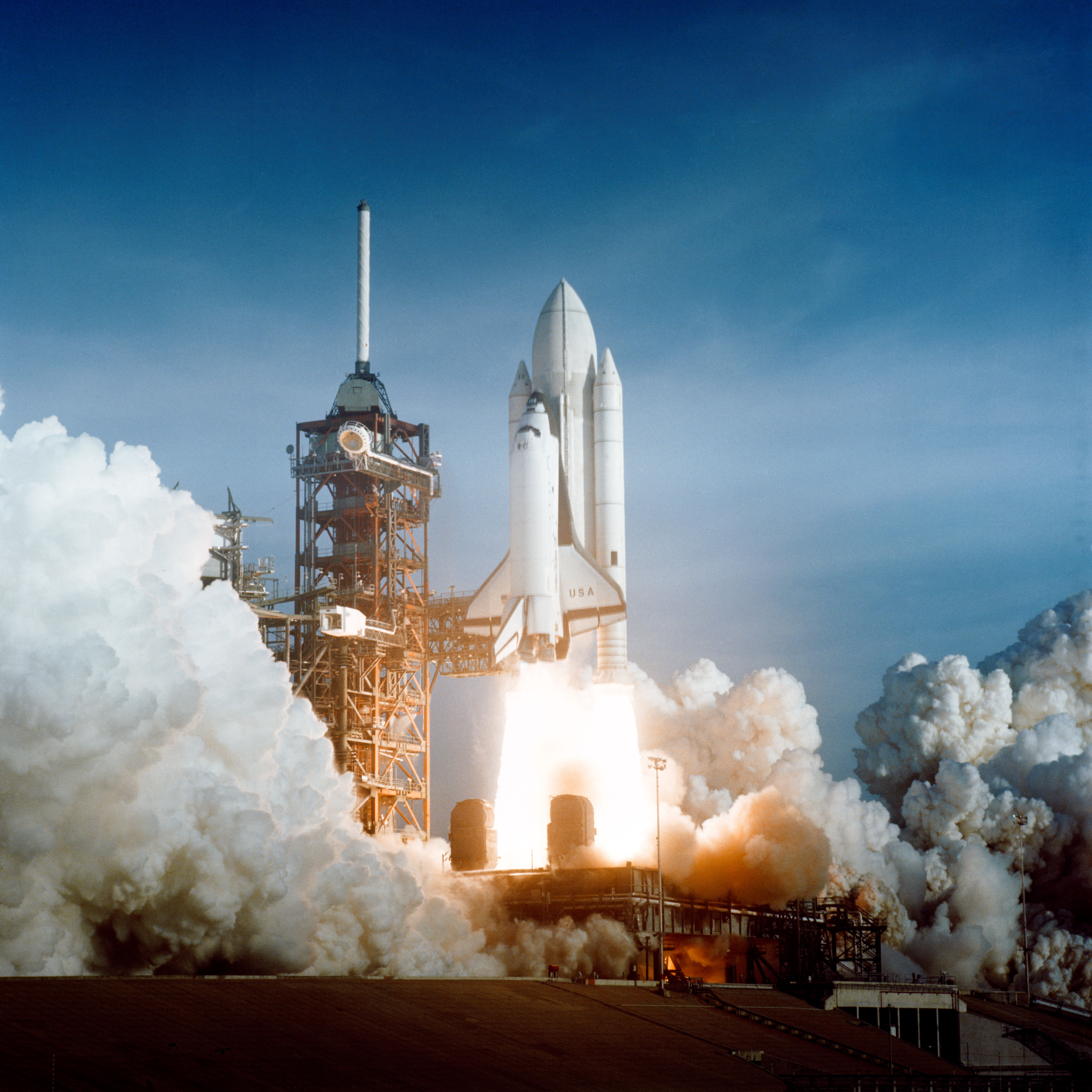
Launch of Space Shuttle Columbia on 12 April 1981 at Pad 39A for mission STS-1

The Space Shuttle was a partially reusable low Earth orbital spacecraft system operated by NASA (the National Aeronautics and Space Administration). Its official program name was Space Transportation System (STS), taken from a 1969 plan for a system of reusable spacecraft of which it was the only item funded for development. Operational missions launched numerous satellites, conducted science experiments in orbit, and participated in construction and servicing of the International Space Station (ISS). The first of four orbital test flights occurred in 1981, leading to operational flights beginning in 1982.

From 1981 to 2011 a total of 135 missions were flown, all launched from Kennedy Space Center in Florida. During that time period the fleet logged 1,322 days, 19 hours, 21 minutes and 23 seconds of flight time. The longest orbital flight of the Shuttle was STS-80 at 17 days 15 hours, while the shortest flight was STS-51-L at one minute 13 seconds when the Space Shuttle Challenger broke apart during launch. The cold morning shrank an O-ring on the right solid rocket booster causing the external fuel tank to explode. The shuttles docked with Russian space station Mir nine times and visited the ISS thirty-seven times. The highest altitude (apogee) achieved by the shuttle was 386 mi (621 km) when deploying the Hubble Space Telescope. The program flew a total of 355 people representing 16 countries, and with 852 total shuttle fliers. The Kennedy Space Center served as the landing site for 78 missions, while 54 missions landed at Edwards Air Force Base in California and one mission landed at White Sands, New Mexico.

The first orbiter built, Enterprise, was used for atmospheric flight tests (ALT) but future plans to upgrade it to orbital capability were ultimately canceled. Four fully operational orbiters were initially built: Columbia, Challenger, Discovery, and Atlantis. Challenger and Columbia were destroyed in mission accidents in 1986 and 2003 respectively, killing a total of fourteen astronauts. A fifth operational orbiter, Endeavour, was built in 1991 to replace Challenger. The Space Shuttle was retired from service upon the conclusion of STS-135 by Atlantis on 21 July 2011.

== Flight numbering ==
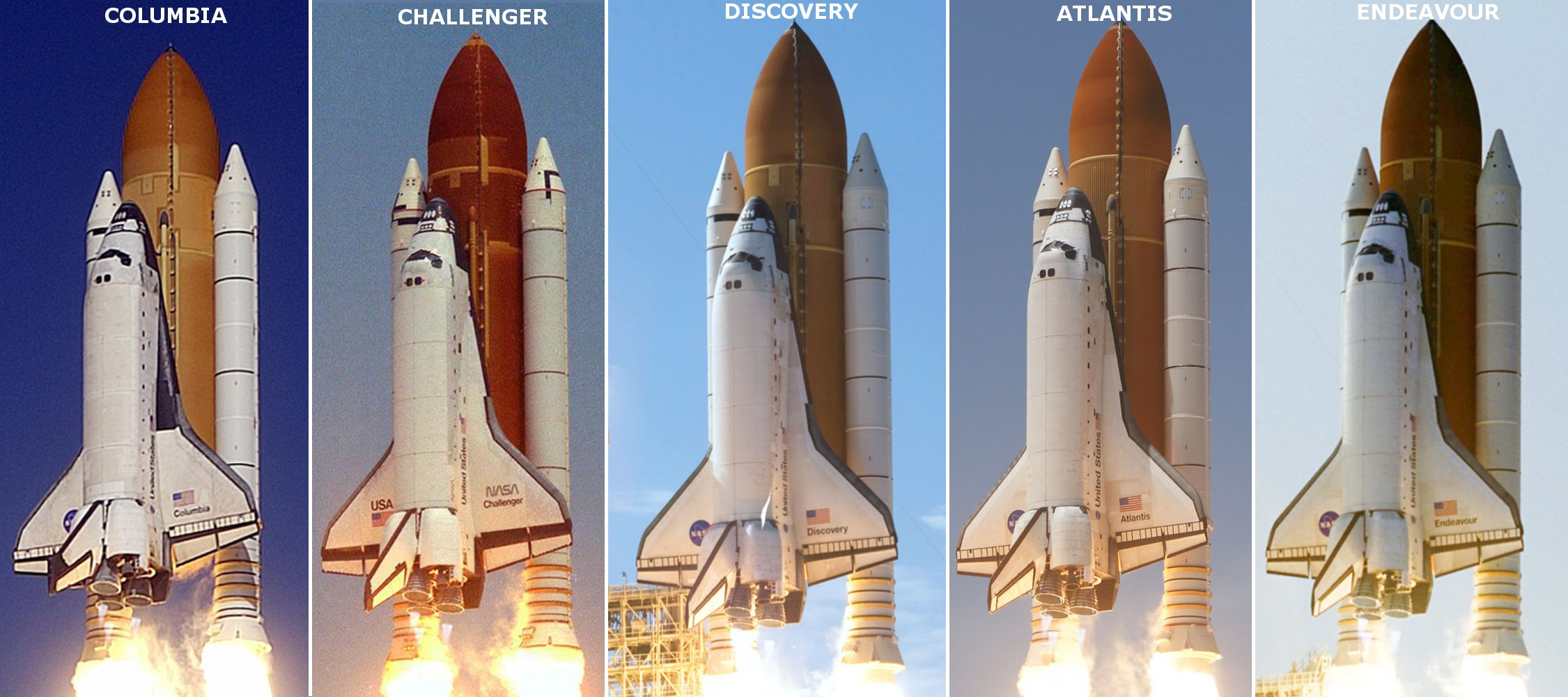
Profiles of all five orbiters at launch.

The U.S. Space Shuttle program was officially referred to as the Space Transportation System (STS). Specific shuttle missions were therefore designated with the prefix "STS". Initially, the launches were given sequential numbers indicating order of launch, such as STS-7. Subsequent to the Apollo 13 mishap, due to Administrator of NASA James M. Beggs's triskaidekaphobia and consequent unwillingness to number a forthcoming flight as STS-13, beginning in 1984, each mission was assigned a code, such as STS-41-B, with the first digit (or pair of digits for years 1990 and beyond) indicating the federal fiscal year offset into the program (so 41-B was scheduled for FY 1984, 51-A through 51-L originally for FY 1985, and the third flight in FY 1985 would have been named 51-C), the second digit indicating the launch site (1 was Kennedy Space Center and 2 was Space Launch Complex 6 at Vandenberg Air Force Base, although Vandenberg was never used), and the letter indicating scheduling sequence. These codes were assigned when the launches were initially scheduled and were not changed as missions were delayed or rescheduled. The codes were adopted from STS-41-B through STS-51-L (although the highest code used was actually STS-61-C), and the sequential numbers were used internally at NASA on all processing paperwork.

After the Challenger disaster, NASA returned to using a sequential numbering system, with the number counting from the beginning of the STS program. Unlike the initial system, however, the numbers were assigned based on the initial mission schedule, and did not always reflect actual launch order. This numbering scheme started at 26, with the first flight as STS-26R—the R suffix stood for "reflight" to disambiguate from prior missions. The suffix was used for two years through STS-33R, then the R was dropped. As a result of the changes in systems, flights under different numbering systems could have the same number with one having a letter appended, e.g. flight STS-51 (a mission carried out by Discovery in 1993) was many years after STS-51-A (Discovery's second flight in 1984). It wasn't until STS-127 in 2009 where the flight numbering system returned to a standard and consistent order.

== Shuttle flights ==
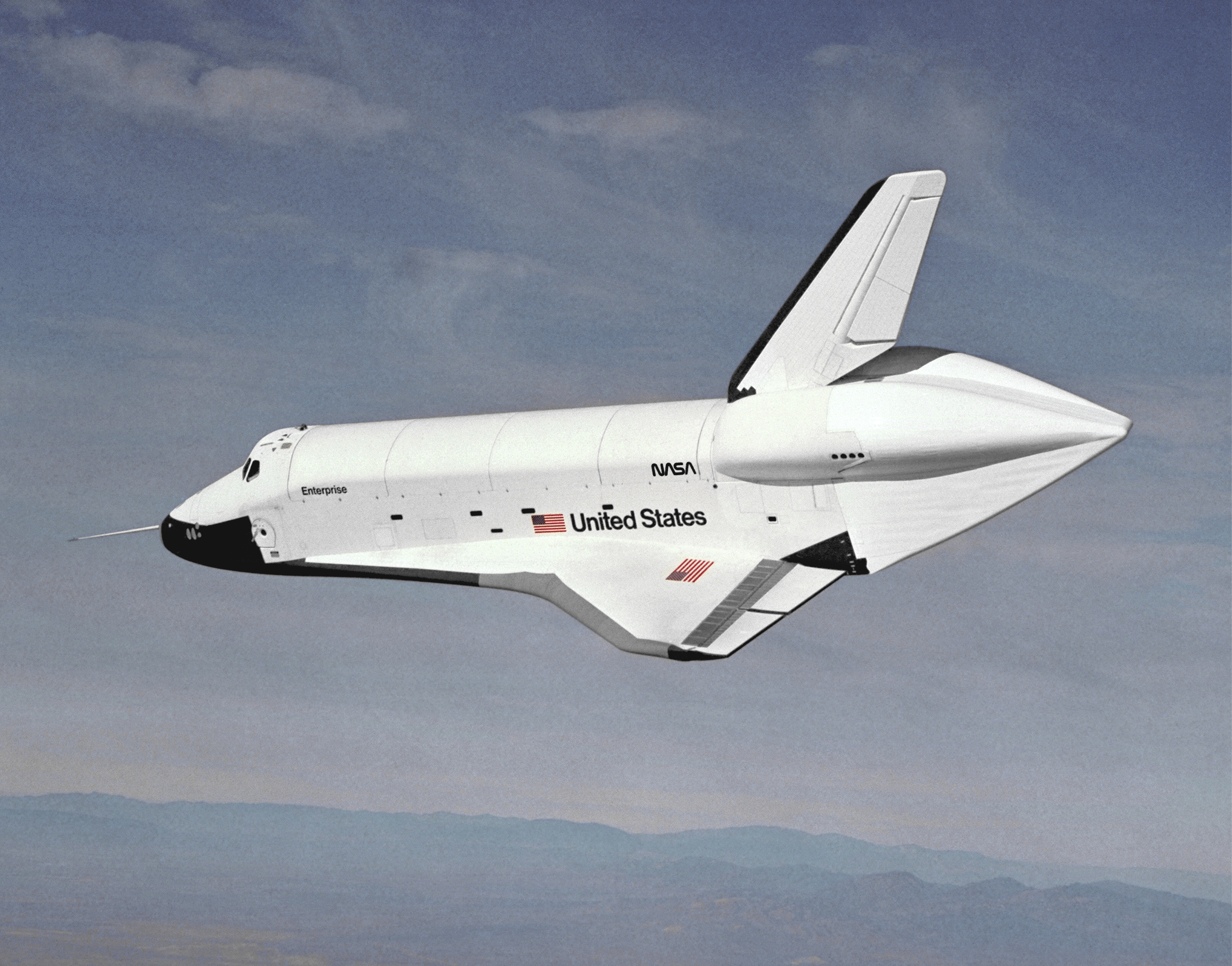
Enterprise on one of its five free-flights during the Approach and Landing Test program

=== Atmospheric flight tests ===
The Approach and Landing Test program encompassed 16 separate tests of Enterprise, covering taxi tests, uncrewed and crewed flights on the Shuttle Carrier Aircraft (SCA), and finally the free flight tests. The following list includes the free-flight tests, durations listed count only the orbiter free-flight time. The list does not include total time aloft along with airborne time atop of the SCA.

Order	Launch date	Mission	Shuttle	Crew	Duration	Landing site	Notes	Refs.
1	12 August 1977	ALT-12	Enterprise	2	00 h 05 m	Edwards	First free flight; First non-captive flight of Enterprise; First landing at Edwards Air Force Base	
2	13 September 1977	ALT-13	Enterprise	2	00 h 05 m	Edwards	Second free flight	
3	23 September 1977	ALT-14	Enterprise	2	00 h 05 m	Edwards	Third free flight	
4	12 October 1977	ALT-15	Enterprise	2	00 h 02 m	Edwards	Fourth free flight; First flight without tailcone (operational configuration)	
5	26 October 1977	ALT-16	Enterprise	2	00 h 02 m	Edwards	Final free flight; Final non-captive flight of Enterprise; First landing on runway rather than lakebed	

=== Launches and orbital flights ===
Order	Launch date	Mission	Shuttle	Crew (Note: If there are two numbers in this column, it signifies the number of astronauts launched and landed with, respectively. If the two numbers are the same, this indicates a crew swap took place during the mission.)	Duration	Launch pad	Landing site	Notes	Refs.
1	12 April 1981; 12:00:04 UTC; 07:00:04 EST	STS-1	Columbia	2	02d 06h	LC-39A	Edwards	First orbital flight test; First reusable orbital spacecraft flight; Maiden flight of Columbia; Maiden flight of the Space Shuttle program	
2	12 November 1981; 15:10:00 UTC; 10:10:00 EST	STS-2	Columbia	2	02d 06h	LC-39A	Edwards	Second orbital flight test; First reuse of a crewed orbital space vehicle; First test of Canadarm robot arm; Truncated due to fuel cell problem; Shortest orbital mission flown	
3	22 March 1982; 16:00:00 UTC; 11:00:00 EST	STS-3	Columbia	2	08d 00h	LC-39A	White Sands	Third orbital test; Only landing at White Sands, New Mexico	
4	27 June 1982; 15:00:00 UTC; 11:00:00 EDT	STS-4	Columbia	2	07d 01h	LC-39A	Edwards	Fourth and final orbital flight test; First Department of Defense (DoD) payload	
5	11 November 1982; 12:19:00 UTC; 07:19:00 EST	STS-5	Columbia	4	05d 02h	LC-39A	Edwards	First "operational" flight; Multiple comsat deployments; First Extravehicular activity of program canceled due to suit problems	
6	4 April 1983; 18:30:00 UTC; 13:30:00 EST	STS-6	Challenger	4	05d 00h	LC-39A	Edwards	Tracking and data relay satellite (TDRS-A) deployment; Maiden flight of Challenger; First Space Shuttle Extravehicular activity	
7	18 June 1983; 11:33:00 UTC; 07:33:00 EDT	STS-7	Challenger	5	06d 02h	LC-39A	Edwards	First American woman in space, Sally Ride; Multiple comsat deployments; First deployment and retrieval of a Shuttle pallet satellite	
8	30 August 1983; 06:32:00 UTC; 02:32:00 EDT	STS-8	Challenger	5	06d 01h	LC-39A	Edwards	Comsat deployment; First flight of an African American in space, Guion Bluford; Test of robot arm on heavy payloads with Payload Flight Test Article; First night launch; First night landing	
9	28 November 1983; 16:00:00 UTC; 11:00:00 EST	STS-9	Columbia	6	10d 07h	LC-39A	Edwards	First Spacelab mission; First European Space Agency Astronaut on a shuttle mission and first West German in space Ulf Merbold	
10	3 February 1984; 13:00:00 UTC; 08:00:00 EST	STS-41-B	Challenger	5	07d 23h	LC-39A	Kennedy SLF	Deployed two Comsats; First untethered spacewalk by Bruce McCandless II with Manned Maneuvering Unit; First landing at Shuttle Landing Facility at Kennedy; Dry run of equipment for Solar Maximum Mission rescue	
11	6 April 1984; 13:58:00 UTC; 08:58:00 EST	STS-41-C	Challenger	5	06d 23h	LC-39A	Edwards	Solar Maximum Mission servicing; First satellite rescue by astronauts; Long Duration Exposure Facility deployment	
12	30 August 1984; 12:41:50 UTC; 08:41:50 EDT	STS-41-D	Discovery	6	06d 00h	LC-39A	Edwards	Multiple comsat deployments; Maiden flight of Discovery; First Jewish American in space, Judith Resnik; Test of OAST-1 Solar Array	
13	5 October 1984; 11:03:00 UTC; 07:03:00 EDT	STS-41-G	Challenger	7	08d 05h	LC-39A	Kennedy SLF	Earth Radiation Budget Satellite deployment; First flight of two women in space, Sally Ride and Kathryn Sullivan; First woman in space twice, Ride; First spacewalk by American woman, Sullivan; First Canadian in space, Marc Garneau; First spaceflight of Australian origin and first Oceanian in space, Paul Scully-Power	
14	8 November 1984; 12:15:00 UTC; 07:15:00 EST	STS-51-A	Discovery	5	07d 23h	LC-39A	Kennedy SLF	Multiple comsat deployments; First mother in space, Anna Lee Fisher; Retrieval of two other comsats (Palapa B2 and Westar VI), which were subsequently refurbished on Earth and reflown	
15	24 January 1985; 19:50:00 UTC; 14:50:00 EST	STS-51-C	Discovery	5	03d 01h	LC-39A	Kennedy SLF	First classified Department of Defense (DoD) mission; Magnum satellite deployment; First flight of an Asian American in space, Ellison Onizuka	
16	12 April 1985; 13:59:05 UTC; 08:59:05 EST	STS-51-D	Discovery	7	06d 23h	LC-39A	Kennedy SLF	Multiple comsat deployments; First flight of a sitting politician in space, Jake Garn; First impromptu Extravehicular activity of program to fix Syncom F3 (Leasat 3)	
17	29 April 1985; 16:02:18 UTC; 12:02:18 EDT	STS-51-B	Challenger	7	07d 00h	LC-39A	Edwards	First mission with Spacelab module in a fully operational configuration; Conducted experiments in microgravity; First African-American Space Shuttle pilot, Frederick D. Gregory	
18	17 June 1985; 11:33:00 UTC; 07:33:00 EDT	STS-51-G	Discovery	7	07d 01h	LC-39A	Edwards	Multiple comsat deployments; Second French in space, Patrick Baudry; Flight of first member of royalty, Saudi, Muslim, and Arab in space, Sultan bin Salman Al Saud	
19	29 July 1985; 22:00:00 UTC; 18:00:00 EDT	STS-51-F	Challenger	7	07d 22h	LC-39A	Edwards	Spacelab mission; Abort to Orbit. Faulty temperature sensor incorrectly indicated that fuel turbine discharge temperature exceeded the limit. Therefore, one main engine was shut down at T+345 s, resulting in a much lower orbit than planned.; All mission objectives achieved	
20	27 August 1985; 10:58:01 UTC; 06:58:01 EDT	STS-51-I	Discovery	5	07d 02h	LC-39A	Edwards	Multiple comsat deployments; Rescue of Syncom F3 (Leasat-3)	
21	3 October 1985; 15:15:30 UTC; 11:15:30 EDT	STS-51-J	Atlantis	5	04d 01h	LC-39A	Edwards	Second classified DoD mission; Defense Satellite Communications System satellite deployment; Maiden flight of Atlantis	
22	30 October 1985; 17:00:00 UTC; 12:00:00 EST	STS-61-A	Challenger	8	07d 00h	LC-39A	Edwards	Largest crew on a spaceflight; Third flight of Spacelab; Spacelab-D1 microgravity experiments; Mission funded by Germany (Note: At the time it was West Germany from 1949 to 1990.); Last successful mission of Challenger; First Dutchman in space, Wubbo Ockels	
23	26 November 1985; 24:29:00 UTC; 19:29:00 EST	STS-61-B	Atlantis	7	06d 21h	LC-39A	Edwards	Multiple comsat deployment; EASE/ACCESS experiment; First Mexican and Hispanic or Latino in space, Rodolfo Neri Vela	
24	12 January 1986; 11:55:00 UTC; 06:55:00 EST	STS-61-C	Columbia	7	06d 02h	LC-39A	Edwards	Comsat deployment; Flight of US Representative Bill Nelson; Second African-American Space Shuttle pilot, Charles Bolden; Last successful mission before STS-51-L	
25	28 January 1986; 16:38:00 UTC; 11:38:00 EST	STS-51-L	Challenger	7	01m 13s (Note: Mission was intended to have a duration for 06d 34m.)	LC-39B	Did not land (Note: This shuttle was intended to land at the Kennedy SLF.)	Planned tracking and data relay satellite (TDRS-B) and Spartan Halley deployment; First Space Shuttle launch from LC-39B; First private citizen astronaut, Christa McAuliffe (part of Teacher in Space Project); First fatal Space Shuttle mission; First first-time astronauts to die during mission besides McAuliffe, Michael J. Smith and Gregory Jarvis; Solid Rocket Booster (SRB) leak and breakup destroyed the orbiter and killed crew	
26	29 September 1988; 15:37:00 UTC; 11:37:00 EDT	STS-26	Discovery	5	04d 01h	LC-39B	Edwards	Second total and first successful launch from LC-39B; Tracking and data relay satellite (TDRS-C) deployment; First post-Challenger flight; First Space Shuttle mission with an all-veteran crew	
27	2 December 1988; 14:30:34 UTC; 09:30:34 EST	STS-27	Atlantis	5	04d 09h	LC-39B	Edwards	Third classified DoD mission; First post-Challenger flight to have first-time astronauts, Guy S. Gardner and William M. Shepherd; Lacrosse 1 deployment; Heavy damage to the thermal protection system resulted in extreme heat damage to the right wing	
28	13 March 1989; 14:57:00 UTC; 09:57:00 EST	STS-29	Discovery	5	04d 23h	LC-39B	Edwards	Tracking and data relay satellite (TDRS-D) deployment; IMAX camera; Space Station Heat Pipe Advanced Radiator Element I space station radiator experiment	
29	4 May 1989; 18:46:59 UTC; 14:46:59 EDT	STS-30	Atlantis	5	04d 00h	LC-39B	Edwards	Magellan Venus probe deployment; First post-Challenger flight to carry a female astronaut	
30	8 August 1989; 12:37:00 UTC; 08:37:00 EDT	STS-28	Columbia	5	05d 01h	LC-39B	Edwards	Fourth classified DoD mission; Satellite Data System deployment	
31	18 October 1989; 16:53:40 UTC; 12:53:40 EDT	STS-34	Atlantis	5	04d 23h	LC-39B	Edwards	Galileo Jupiter probe deployment; First post-Challenger flight to have a first-time woman astronaut, Ellen S. Baker; First time since the Challenger disaster with two women astronauts, Baker and Shannon Lucid; IMAX camera	
32	22 November 1989; 24:23:30 UTC; 19:23:30 EST	STS-33	Discovery	5	05d 00h	LC-39B	Edwards	Fifth classified DoD mission; Deployment of Magnum; First African-American Space Shuttle commander, Frederick D. Gregory	
33	9 January 1990; 12:35:00 UTC; 07:35:00 EST	STS-32	Columbia	5	10d 21h	LC-39A	Edwards	Syncom IV-F5 satellite deployment; Long Duration Exposure Facility retrieval; IMAX camera	
34	28 February 1990; 07:50:22 UTC; 02:50:22 EST	STS-36	Atlantis	5	04d 10h	LC-39A	Edwards	Sixth classified DoD mission; Misty reconnaissance satellite deployment	
35	24 April 1990; 12:33:51 UTC; 08:33:51 EDT	STS-31	Discovery	5	05d 01h	LC-39B	Edwards	Hubble Space Telescope (HST) deployment	
36	6 October 1990; 11:47:15 UTC; 07:47:15 EDT	STS-41	Discovery	5	04d 02h	LC-39B	Edwards	Ulysses/Inertial Upper Stage solar probe deployment	
37	15 November 1990; 23:48:15 UTC; 18:48:15 EST	STS-38	Atlantis	5	04d 21h	LC-39A	Kennedy SLF	Seventh classified DoD mission; Likely SDS2-2 deployed	
38	2 December 1990; 06:49:01 UTC; 01:49:01 EST	STS-35	Columbia	7	08d 23h	LC-39B	Edwards	Use of ASTRO-1 observatory; First post-Challenger mission to have a crew of 7; First time since the Challenger disaster to have two payload specialists, Samuel T. Durrance and Ronald A. Parise	
39	5 April 1991; 14:22:45 UTC; 09:22:45 EST	STS-37	Atlantis	5	05d 23h	LC-39B	Edwards	Compton Gamma Ray Observatory deployment and EVA repair	
40	28 April 1991; 11:33:14 UTC; 07:33:14 EDT	STS-39	Discovery	7	08d 07h	LC-39A	Kennedy SLF	First unclassified DoD mission (eighth DoD mission overall); Military science experiments	
41	5 June 1991; 13:24:51 UTC; 09:24:51 EDT	STS-40	Columbia	7	09d 02h	LC-39B	Edwards	Spacelab mission; First space mission with three women	
42	2 August 1991; 15:02:00 UTC; 11:02:00 EDT	STS-43	Atlantis	5	08d 21h	LC-39A	Kennedy SLF	Tracking and data relay satellite (TDRS-E) deployment; First woman in space thrice, Shannon Lucid	
43	12 September 1991; 23:11:04 UTC; 19:11:04 EDT	STS-48	Discovery	5	05d 08h	LC-39A	Edwards	Upper Atmosphere Research Satellite deployment	
44	24 November 1991; 23:44:00 UTC; 18:44:00 EST	STS-44	Atlantis	6	06d 22h	LC-39A	Edwards	Second unclassified DoD mission (ninth DoD mission overall); DSP satellite deployment	
45	22 January 1992; 14:52:33 UTC; 09:52:33 EST	STS-42	Discovery	7	08d 01h	LC-39A	Edwards	Spacelab mission; First Canadian woman in space, Roberta Bondar	
46	24 March 1992; 13:13:40 UTC; 08:13:40 EST	STS-45	Atlantis	7	08d 22h	LC-39A	Kennedy SLF	ATLAS-1 science platform; Second African-American Space Shuttle commander, Charles Bolden; First spaceflight of British and English origin, Michael Foale; First Belgian in space, Dirk Frimout	
47	7 May 1992; 23:40:00 UTC; 19:40:00 EDT	STS-49	Endeavour	7	08d 21h	LC-39B	Edwards	Intelsat VI hand-retrieval and repair; Maiden flight of Endeavour; First three-person Extravehicular activity; Assembly of Station by EVA Methods (ASEM) space station truss experiment EVA; Record four EVAs total for mission; First landing with a drag chute	
48	25 June 1992; 16:12:23 UTC; 12:12:23 EDT	STS-50	Columbia	7	13d 19h	LC-39A	Kennedy SLF	Spacelab mission	
49	31 July 1992; 13:56:48 UTC; 09:56:48 EDT	STS-46	Atlantis	7	07d 23h	LC-39B	Kennedy SLF	Deployment of EURECA; Deployment of National Aeronautics and Space Administration/Italian Space Agency Tethered Satellite System (TSS); First Italian in space, Franco Malerba; First Swiss in space, Claude Nicollier	
50	12 September 1992; 14:23:00 UTC; 10:23:00 EDT	STS-47	Endeavour	7	07d 22h	LC-39B	Kennedy SLF	Spacelab-J; First flight of an African-American woman in space, Mae Jemison; First and only flight of a married couple in space, Mark C. Lee and Jan Davis; First Japanese in space, Mamoru Mohri; Japan funded mission	
51	22 October 1992; 17:09:39 UTC; 13:09:39 EDT	STS-52	Columbia	6	09d 20h	LC-39B	Kennedy SLF	LAGEOS II deployment; Microgravity experiments	
52	2 December 1992; 13:24:00 UTC; 08:24:00 EST	STS-53	Discovery	5	07d 07h	LC-39A	Edwards	Partially classified 10th and final DoD mission; Likely deployment of SDS2 satellite	
53	13 January 1993; 13:59:30 UTC; 08:59:30 EST	STS-54	Endeavour	5	05d 23h	LC-39B	Kennedy SLF	Tracking and data relay satellite (TDRS-F) deployment	
54	8 April 1993; 05:29:00 UTC; 01:29:00 EDT	STS-56	Discovery	5	09d 06h	LC-39B	Kennedy SLF	ATLAS-2 science platform	
55	26 April 1993; 14:50:00 UTC; 10:50:00 EDT	STS-55	Columbia	7	09d 23h	LC-39A	Edwards	Spacelab-D2; Mission funded by Germany	
56	21 June 1993; 13:07:22 UTC; 09:07:22 EDT	STS-57	Endeavour	6	09d 23h	LC-39B	Kennedy SLF	Scientific Experiments aboard the SPACEHAB module; Retrieval of EURECA	
57	12 September 1993; 11:45:00 UTC; 07:45:00 EDT	STS-51	Discovery	5	09d 20h	LC-39B	Kennedy SLF	ACTS satellite deployed; Orbiting Retrievable Far and Extreme Ultraviolet Spectrometer with IMAX camera deployed; First night landing at Kennedy Space Center	
58	18 October 1993; 14:53:10 UTC; 10:53:10 EDT	STS-58	Columbia	7	14d 00h	LC-39B	Edwards	Spacelab mission; First woman in space on a fourth time, Shannon Lucid	
59	2 December 1993; 09:27:00 UTC; 04:27:00 EST	STS-61	Endeavour	7	10d 19h	LC-39B	Kennedy SLF	First Hubble Space Telescope servicing mission	
60	3 February 1994; 12:10:00 UTC; 07:10:00 EST	STS-60	Discovery	6	07d 06h	LC-39A	Kennedy SLF	SPACEHAB; Wake Shield Facility; First Russian cosmonaut to fly on the Space Shuttle, Sergei Krikalev	
61	4 March 1994; 13:53:00 UTC; 08:53:00 EST	STS-62	Columbia	5	13d 23h	LC-39B	Kennedy SLF	Microgravity experiments	
62	9 April 1994; 11:05:00 UTC; 07:05:00 EDT	STS-59	Endeavour	6	11d 05h	LC-39A	Edwards	Experiments aboard Shuttle Radar Laboratory-1	
63	8 July 1994; 04:43:00 UTC; 00:43:00 EDT	STS-65	Columbia	7	14d 17h	LC-39A	Kennedy SLF	Spacelab mission; First Japanese woman in space, Chiaki Mukai	
64	9 September 1994; 22:22:05 UTC; 18:22:05 EDT	STS-64	Discovery	6	10d 22h	LC-39B	Edwards	Multiple science experiments; SPARTAN	
65	30 September 1994; 11:16:00 UTC; 07:16:00 EDT	STS-68	Endeavour	6	11d 05h	LC-39A	Edwards	Experiments aboard Space Radar Laboratory-2	
66	3 November 1994; 16:59:43 UTC; 11:59:43 EST	STS-66	Atlantis	6	10d 22h	LC-39B	Edwards	ATLAS-3 science platform	
67	3 February 1995; 05:22:04 UTC; 00:22:04 EST	STS-63	Discovery	6	08d 06h	LC-39B	Kennedy SLF	Mir rendezvous; SPACEHAB; IMAX camera; First female Space Shuttle pilot, Eileen Collins	
68	2 March 1995; 06:38:13 UTC; 01:38:13 EST	STS-67	Endeavour	7	16d 15h	LC-39A	Edwards	ASTRO-2 Deployment	
69	27 June 1995; 19:32:19 UTC; 15:32:19 EDT	STS-71	Atlantis	7/8	09d 19h	LC-39A	Kennedy SLF	First Shuttle-Mir docking	
70	13 July 1995; 13:41:55 UTC; 09:41:55 EDT	STS-70	Discovery	5	08d 22h	LC-39B	Kennedy SLF	Tracking and data relay satellite (TDRS-G) deployment	
71	7 September 1995; 15:09:00 UTC; 11:09:00 EDT	STS-69	Endeavour	5	10d 20h	LC-39A	Kennedy SLF	Wake Shield Facility; SPARTAN	
72	20 October 1995; 13:53:00 UTC; 09:53:00 EDT	STS-73	Columbia	7	15d 21h	LC-39B	Kennedy SLF	Spacelab mission	
73	12 November 1995; 12:30:43 UTC; 07:30:43 EST	STS-74	Atlantis	5	08d 04h	LC-39A	Kennedy SLF	Second Shuttle-Mir docking; Delivered docking module; Delivered IMAX cargo bay camera	
74	11 January 1996; 09:41:00 UTC; 04:41:00 EST	STS-72	Endeavour	6	08d 22h	LC-39B	Kennedy SLF	Retrieved Japan's Space Flyer Unit; 2 Extravehicular activities	
75	22 February 1996; 20:18:00 UTC; 15:18:00 EST	STS-75	Columbia	7	15d 17h	LC-39B	Kennedy SLF	Tethered satellite reflight, lost due to broken tether	
76	22 March 1996; 08:13:04 UTC; 03:13:04 EST	STS-76	Atlantis	6/5	09d 05h	LC-39B	Edwards	Shuttle-Mir docking; First woman in space on a fifth time, Shannon Lucid (during launch)	
77	19 May 1996; 10:30:00 UTC; 06:30:00 EDT	STS-77	Endeavour	6	10d 00h	LC-39B	Kennedy SLF	SPACEHAB; SPARTAN	
78	20 June 1996; 14:49:00 UTC; 10:49:00 EDT	STS-78	Columbia	7	16d 21h	LC-39B	Kennedy SLF	Spacelab mission	
79	16 September 1996; 08:54:49 UTC; 04:54:49 EDT	STS-79	Atlantis	6/6	10d 03h	LC-39A	Kennedy SLF	Shuttle-Mir docking; First woman in space on a fifth time, Shannon Lucid (during landing)	
80	19 November 1996; 19:55:47 UTC; 14:55:47 EST	STS-80	Columbia	5	17d 15h	LC-39B	Kennedy SLF	Wake Shield Facility; Orbiting and Retrievable Far and Extreme Ultraviolet Spectrometer-Shuttle Pallet Satellite (ORFEUS) II; Longest Space Shuttle mission flown; Story Musgrave becomes the only astronaut to fly on all five Space Shuttle orbiters	
81	12 January 1997; 09:27:23 UTC; 04:27:23 EST	STS-81	Atlantis	6/6	10d 04h	LC-39B	Kennedy SLF	Shuttle-Mir docking	
82	11 February 1997; 08:55:17 UTC; 03:55:17 EST	STS-82	Discovery	7	09d 23h	LC-39A	Kennedy SLF	Hubble Space Telescope servicing	
83	4 April 1997; 19:20:32 UTC; 14:20:32 EST	STS-83	Columbia	7	03d 23h	LC-39A	Kennedy SLF	Spacelab mission; Truncated due to fuel cell problem; Second female Space Shuttle pilot, Susan L. Still	
84	15 May 1997; 08:07:48 UTC; 04:07:48 EDT	STS-84	Atlantis	7/7	09d 05h	LC-39A	Kennedy SLF	Shuttle-Mir docking; First Russian woman in space, Yelena Kondakova; First Peruvian and South American in space, Carlos I. Noriega	
85	1 July 1997; 18:02:00 UTC; 14:02:00 EDT	STS-94	Columbia	7	15d 16h	LC-39A	Kennedy SLF	Spacelab mission; Reflight of STS-83	
86	7 August 1997; 14:41:00 UTC; 10:41:00 EDT	STS-85	Discovery	6	11d 20h	LC-39A	Kennedy SLF	Deployed and retrieved Cryogenic Infrared Spectrometers and Telescopes for the Atmosphere-Shuttle Pallet Satellite-2 (CRISTA-SPAS)	
87	25 September 1997; 14:34:19 UTC; 10:34:19 EDT	STS-86	Atlantis	7/7	10d 19h	LC-39A	Kennedy SLF	Shuttle-Mir docking	
88	19 November 1997; 19:46:00 UTC; 14:46:00 EST	STS-87	Columbia	6	15d 16h	LC-39B	Kennedy SLF	Microgravity experiments; 2 Extravehicular activities; SPARTAN; First spaceflight by a woman of Indian origin and Asian American woman, Kalpana Chawla; First Ukrainian astronaut, Leonid Kadeniuk	
89	22 January 1998; 02:48:15 UTC (Note: The listed UTC time occurs the next day.); 21:48:15 EST	STS-89	Endeavour	7/7	08d 19h	LC-39A	Kennedy SLF	Shuttle-Mir docking	
90	17 April 1998; 18:19:00 UTC; 14:19:00 EDT	STS-90	Columbia	7	15d 21h	LC-39B	Kennedy SLF	Spacelab mission; Final flight with the Spacelab module	
91	2 June 1998; 22:06:24 UTC; 18:06:24 EDT	STS-91	Discovery	6/7	09d 19h	LC-39A	Kennedy SLF	Last Shuttle-Mir docking	
92	29 October 1998; 19:19:34 UTC; 14:19:34 EST	STS-95	Discovery	7	08d 21h	LC-39B	Kennedy SLF	SPACEHAB; John Glenn, flies again	
93	4 December 1998; 08:35:34 UTC; 03:35:34 EST	STS-88	Endeavour	6	11d 19h	LC-39A	Kennedy SLF	ISS assembly flight 2A: Node 1; First Shuttle ISS assembly flight	
94	27 May 1999; 10:49:42 UTC; 06:49:42 EDT	STS-96	Discovery	7	09d 19h	LC-39B	Kennedy SLF	ISS supply	
95	23 July 1999; 04:31:00 UTC; 00:31:00 EDT	STS-93	Columbia	5	04d 22h	LC-39B	Kennedy SLF	Chandra X-ray Observatory deployed; First female Space Shuttle commander, Eileen Collins	
96	19 December 1999; 00:50:00 UTC; 19:50:00 EST	STS-103	Discovery	7	07d 23h	LC-39B	Kennedy SLF	Hubble Space Telescope servicing	
97	11 February 2000; 16:43:40 UTC; 12:43:40 EDT	STS-99	Endeavour	6	11d 05h	LC-39A	Kennedy SLF	Shuttle Radar Topography Mission	
98	19 May 2000; 10:11:10 UTC; 06:11:10 EDT	STS-101	Atlantis	7	09d 21h	LC-39A	Kennedy SLF	ISS supply	
99	8 September 2000; 12:45:47 UTC; 08:45:47 EDT	STS-106	Atlantis	7	11d 19h	LC-39B	Kennedy SLF	ISS supply	
100	11 October 2000; 23:17:00 UTC; 18:17:00 EST	STS-92	Discovery	7	12d 21h	LC-39A	Edwards	ISS assembly flight 3A: Z1 truss; Third female Space Shuttle pilot, Pamela Melroy	
101	30 November 2000; 03:06:01 UTC; 22:06:01 EST	STS-97	Endeavour	5	10d 19h	LC-39B	Kennedy SLF	ISS assembly flight 4A: P6 solar arrays, radiators; 100th successful mission	
102	7 February 2001; 23:13:02 UTC; 18:13:02 EST	STS-98	Atlantis	5	12d 21h	LC-39A	Edwards	ISS assembly flight 5A: Destiny lab	
103	8 March 2001; 11:42:09 UTC; 06:42:09 EST	STS-102	Discovery	7/7	12d 19h	LC-39B	Kennedy SLF	ISS supply and crew rotation	
104	19 April 2001; 18:40:42 UTC; 14:40:42 EDT	STS-100	Endeavour	7	11d 21h	LC-39A	Edwards	ISS assembly flight 6A: robotic arm; First spacewalk by a Canadian, Chris Hadfield	
105	12 July 2001; 09:03:59 UTC; 05:03:59 EDT	STS-104	Atlantis	5	12d 18h	LC-39B	Kennedy SLF	ISS assembly flight 7A: Quest Joint Airlock	
106	10 August 2001; 21:10:14 UTC; 17:10:14 EDT	STS-105	Discovery	7/7	11d 21h	LC-39A	Kennedy SLF	ISS supply and crew rotation	
107	5 December 2001; 22:19:28 UTC; 17:19:28 EST	STS-108	Endeavour	7/7	11d 19h	LC-39B	Kennedy SLF	ISS supply and crew rotation	
108	1 March 2002; 11:22:02 UTC; 06:22:02 EST	STS-109	Columbia	7	10d 22h	LC-39A	Kennedy SLF	Hubble Space Telescope servicing; Last successful mission for Columbia	
109	8 April 2002; 20:44:19 UTC; 16:44:19 EDT	STS-110	Atlantis	7	10d 19h	LC-39B	Kennedy SLF	ISS assembly flight 8A: S0 truss; Jerry L. Ross becomes the first astronaut to make seven spaceflights	
110	5 June 2002; 21:22:49 UTC; 17:22:49 EDT	STS-111	Endeavour	7/7	13d 20h	LC-39A	Edwards	ISS supply and crew rotation; Mobile Base System; Franklin Chang-Díaz becomes the second astronaut to make seven spaceflights	
111	7 October 2002; 19:45:51 UTC; 15:45:51 EDT	STS-112	Atlantis	6	10d 19h	LC-39B	Kennedy SLF	ISS assembly flight 9A: S1 truss	
112	23 November 2002; 00:49:47 UTC; 19:49:47 EST	STS-113	Endeavour	7/7	13d 18h	LC-39A	Kennedy SLF	ISS assembly flight 11A: P1 truss, crew rotation; Last successful mission before STS-107	
113	16 January 2003; 15:39:00 UTC; 10:39:00 EST	STS-107	Columbia	7	15d 22h	LC-39A	Did not land	SPACEHAB; First Israeli in space, Ilan Ramon; First first-time astronauts to die during re-entry besides Ramon, William C. McCool, David M. Brown, and Laurel Clark; Re-entry breakup disintegrated the orbiter and killed crew	
114	26 July 2005; 14:39:00 UTC; 10:39:00 EDT	STS-114	Discovery	7	13d 21h	LC-39B	Edwards	First post-Columbia flight; First post-Columbia mission to have two first-time astronauts, Soichi Noguchi and Charles J. Camarda; Flight safety Evaluation/testing; ISS supply/repair; MPLM Raffaello	
115	4 July 2006; 18:37:55 UTC; 14:37:55 EDT	STS-121	Discovery	7/6	12d 18h	LC-39B	Kennedy SLF	ISS Flight ULF1.1: supply and crew rotation; MPLM Leonardo; First post-Columbia flight to have two first-time women astronauts, Lisa Nowak and Stephanie Wilson	
116	9 September 2006; 15:14:55 UTC; 11:14:55 EDT	STS-115	Atlantis	6	11d 19h	LC-39B	Kennedy SLF	ISS assembly flight 12A: P3/P4 Truss, Solar Arrays	
117	9 December 2006; 24:47:35 UTC; 20:47:35 EDT	STS-116	Discovery	7/7	12d 21h	LC-39B	Kennedy SLF	ISS assembly flight 12A.1: P5 Truss & SPACEHAB-SM; Crew rotation; First night launch since STS-113; Final Space Shuttle launch from LC-39B	
118	8 June 2007; 23:38:04 UTC; 19:38:04 EDT	STS-117	Atlantis	7/7	13d 20h	LC-39A	Edwards	ISS assembly flight 13A: S3/S4 Truss, Solar Arrays; Crew rotation	
119	8 August 2007; 22:36:42 UTC; 18:36:42 EDT	STS-118	Endeavour	7	12d 18h	LC-39A	Kennedy SLF	ISS assembly flight 13A.1: S5 Truss & SPACEHAB-SM & ESP-3; First use of Station-to-Shuttle Power Transfer System (SSPTS); First oldest first-time astronaut, Barbara Morgan (55 years old at the time of mission)	
120	23 October 2007; 15:38:19 UTC; 11:38:19 EDT	STS-120	Discovery	7/7	15d 02h	LC-39A	Kennedy SLF	ISS assembly flight 10A: US Harmony module; Crew rotation; Second female Space Shuttle commander, Pamela Melroy	
121	7 February 2008; 19:45:30 UTC; 14:45:30 EST	STS-122	Atlantis	7/7	12d 18h	LC-39A	Kennedy SLF	ISS assembly flight 1E: European Laboratory Columbus; Crew rotation	
122	11 March 2008; 06:28:14 UTC; 02:28:14 EDT	STS-123	Endeavour	7/7	15d 18h	LC-39A	Kennedy SLF	ISS assembly flight 1J/A: Experiment Logistics Module-Pressurized Section (ELM PS) & SPDM; Crew rotation	
123	31 May 2008; 21:02:12 UTC; 17:02:12 EDT	STS-124	Discovery	7/7	13d 18h	LC-39A	Kennedy SLF	ISS assembly flight 1J: Japanese modules Kibo and RMS	
124	14 November 2008; 24:55:39 UTC; 19:55:39 EST	STS-126	Endeavour	7/7	15d 20h	LC-39A	Edwards	ISS assembly flight ULF2: MPLM Leonardo; Crew rotation	
125	15 March 2009; 23:43:44 UTC; 19:43:44 EDT	STS-119	Discovery	7/7	12d 19h	LC-39A	Kennedy SLF	ISS assembly flight 15A: S6 Truss, Solar Arrays	
126	11 May 2009; 18:01:56 UTC; 14:01:56 EDT	STS-125	Atlantis	7	12d 21h	LC-39A	Edwards	Last Hubble Space Telescope servicing mission; Final Non-ISS flight	
127	15 July 2009; 22:03:10 UTC; 18:03:10 EDT	STS-127	Endeavour	7/7	15d 16h	LC-39A	Kennedy SLF	ISS assembly flight 2J/A: Japanese Experiment Module Exposed Facility (EF) and ELM ES	
128	28 August 2009; 03:59:37 UTC; 23:59:37 EDT	STS-128	Discovery	7/7	13d 21h	LC-39A	Edwards	ISS assembly flight 17A: MPLM Leonardo; Crew rotation; Final landing at Edwards AFB	
129	16 November 2009; 19:28:01 UTC; 14:28:01 EST	STS-129	Atlantis	6/7	10d 19h	LC-39A	Kennedy SLF	ISS assembly flight ULF3: ExPRESS Logistics Carriers (ELCs) 1 & 2; Final Space Shuttle mission to perform a crew rotation	
130	8 February 2010; 09:14:07 UTC; 04:14:07 EST	STS-130	Endeavour	6	13d 18h	LC-39A	Kennedy SLF	ISS assembly flight 20A: Node 3 and Cupola	
131	5 April 2010; 10:21:25 UTC; 06:21:25 EDT	STS-131	Discovery	7	15d 03h	LC-39A	Kennedy SLF	ISS assembly flight 19A: Utility and Logistics Flight 4: Multi-Purpose Logistics Module Leonardo; Last night launch of the Shuttle Program; Final Space Shuttle mission with rookie astronauts; Final Space Shuttle mission with a crew of 7	
132	14 May 2010; 18:20:09 UTC; 14:20:09 EDT	STS-132	Atlantis	6	11d 18h	LC-39A	Kennedy SLF	ISS assembly flight ULF4: Mini-Research Module 1; Originally intended as Atlantis' final flight if STS-135 wasn't approved	
133	24 February 2011; 21:53:24 UTC; 16:53:24 EST	STS-133	Discovery	6	12d 19h	LC-39A	Kennedy SLF	ISS assembly flight ULF5, Permanent Multipurpose Module Leonardo, ExPRESS Logistics Carrier 4; Final flight of Discovery; Final daytime landing of the Shuttle Program	
134	16 May 2011; 12:56:28 UTC; 08:56:28 EDT	STS-134	Endeavour	6	15d 18h	LC-39A	Kennedy SLF	ISS assembly flight ULF6, ELC 3, Alpha Magnetic Spectrometer; Final flight of Endeavour	
135	8 July 2011; 15:29:04 UTC; 11:29:04 EDT	STS-135	Atlantis	4	12d 18h	LC-39A	Kennedy SLF	Payload Multi-Purpose Logistics Module (MPLM) Raffaello; Final flight of Atlantis; Final flight of the Space Shuttle program	

== Shuttle missions ==
=== Canceled missions ===
One initial RTLS abort sub-orbital test mission was canceled due to high risk. Many other planned missions were canceled due to the late development of the shuttle, and the Challenger and Columbia disasters.

Four missions were cut short by a day or more while in orbit: STS-2 (equipment failure), STS-35 (weather), STS-44 (equipment failure), and STS-83 (equipment failure, relaunched as STS-94).

=== Contingency missions ===
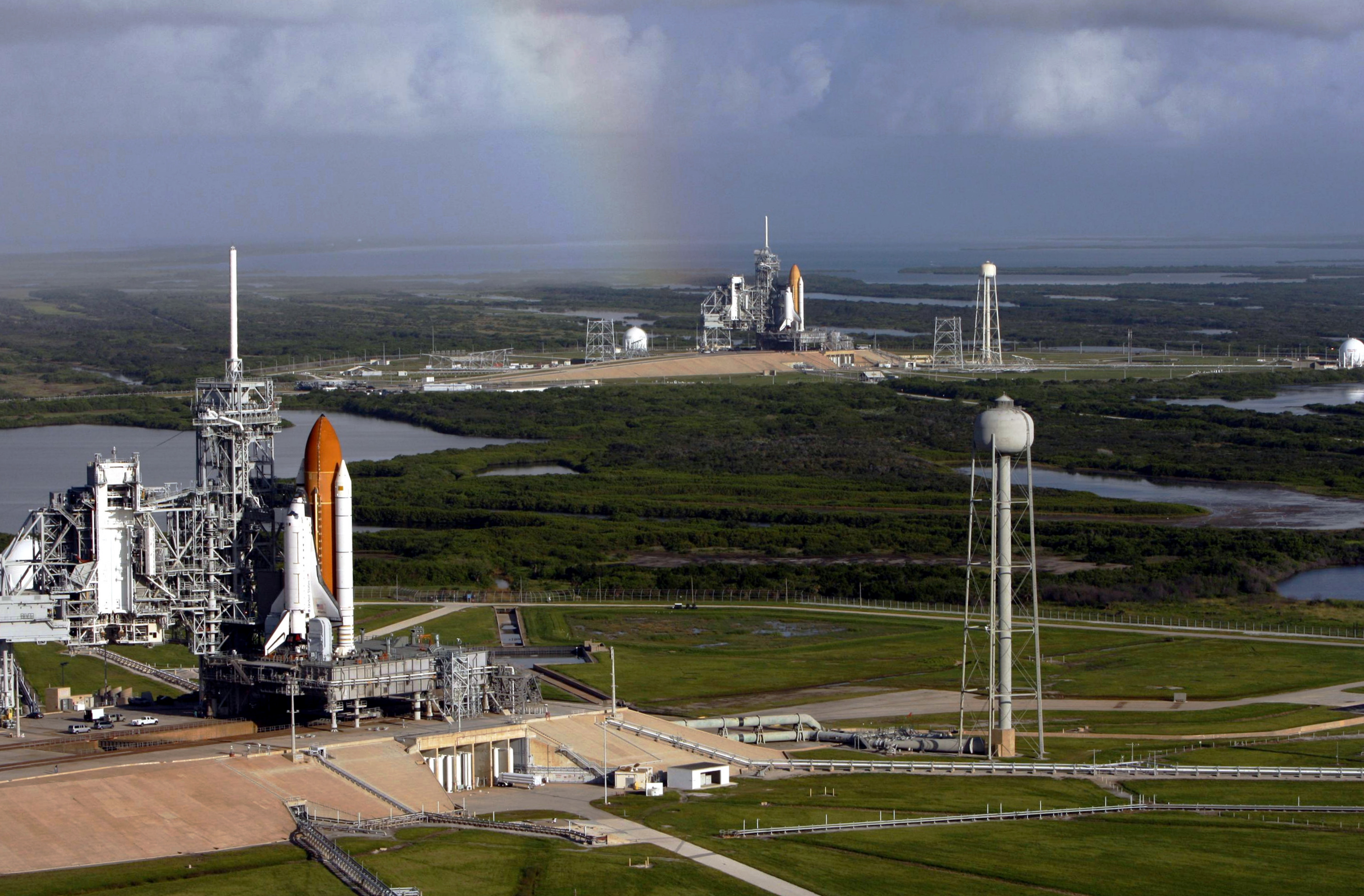
Atlantis and Endeavour on LC-39A and LC-39B. Endeavour was slated to launch for STS-400 rescue mission should Atlantis (STS-125) be found unable to return safely to Earth.

STS-300 was the designation for the Space Shuttle Launch on Need (LON) missions to be launched on short notice for STS-114 and STS-121, in the event that the shuttle became disabled or damaged and could not safely return to Earth. The rescue flight for STS-115, if needed, would have been STS-301. After STS-115, the rescue mission designations were based on the corresponding regular mission that would be replaced should the rescue mission be needed. For example, the STS-116 rescue mission was branded STS-317, because the normal mission scheduled after STS-116 was STS-117. Should the rescue mission have been needed, the crew and vehicle for STS-117 would assume the rescue mission profile and become STS-317. All potential rescue missions were to be launched with a crew of four, and would return with ten or eleven crew members, depending on the number of crew launched on the rescued shuttle. Missions were expected to last approximately eleven days. None of the planned contingency missions were ever flown.

No contingency mission was planned for STS-135, the final shuttle mission. Instead, NASA planned to effect any required rescues one-by-one, using Russian Soyuz spacecraft.

Flight	Rescue flight
STS-114 (Discovery)	STS-300 (Atlantis)
STS-121 (Discovery)	STS-300 (Atlantis)
STS-115 (Atlantis)	STS-301 (Discovery)
STS-116 (Discovery)	STS-317 (Atlantis)
STS-117 (Atlantis)	STS-318 (Endeavour)
STS-118 (Endeavour)	STS-322 (Discovery)
STS-120 (Discovery)	STS-320 (Atlantis) (Note: NASA called this mission STS-320 instead of STS-321.)
STS-122 (Atlantis)	STS-323 (Discovery) (Note: Originally scheduled to be Endeavour, changed to Discovery due to contamination issues.)
STS-123 (Endeavour)	STS-324 (Discovery)
STS-124 (Discovery)	STS-326 (Endeavour)
STS-125 (Atlantis)	STS-400 (Endeavour)
STS-134 (Endeavour)	STS-335 (Atlantis)

== Flight statistics ==
=== Orbiters ===
Key
‡	Test vehicle
†	Lost

Shuttle	Designation	Flights	Flight time	Orbits	Longest flight	First flight		Last flight		Mir dockings	ISS dockings	Sources
Shuttle	Designation	Flights	Flight time	Orbits	Longest flight	Flight	Date	Flight	Date	Mir dockings	ISS dockings	Sources
Enterprise ‡	OV-101	5	00d 00h 19m	—N/a	00d 00h 05m	ALT-12	12 August 1977	ALT-16	26 October 1977	—N/a	—N/a	
Columbia †	OV-102	28	300d 17h 47m 15s	4,808	17d 15h 53m 18s	STS-1	12 April 1981	STS-107	16 January 2003	0	0	
Challenger †	OV-099	10	62d 07h 56m 15s	995	08d 05h 23m 33s	STS-6	4 April 1983	STS-51-L	28 January 1986	0	0	
Discovery	OV-103	39	364d 22h 39m 29s	5,830	15d 02h 48m 08s	STS-41-D	30 August 1984	STS-133	24 February 2011	1	13	
Atlantis	OV-104	33	306d 14h 12m 43s	4,848	13d 20h 12m 44s	STS-51-J	3 October 1985	STS-135	8 July 2011	7	12	
Endeavour	OV-105	25	296d 03h 34m 02s	4,677	16d 15h 08m 48s	STS-49	7 May 1992	STS-134	16 May 2011	1	12	
Total		135	1,330d 18h 9m 44s	21,158						9	37	

=== Flights ===
- Enterprise
- Columbia
- Challenger
- Discovery
- Atlantis
- Endeavour

== See also ==
- International Space Station construction
- List of Buran missions
- List of human spaceflights
- List of human spaceflights to the International Space Station
- List of Soyuz missions
- List of Space Shuttle crews
- List of Space Shuttle rollbacks

== Bibliography ==
- Chen, Adam (2012). Wallack, William; Gonzalez, George (eds.). Celebrating 30 years the Space Shuttle Program. Washington, D.C., United States: NASA. ISBN 978-0-16-090202-4.
- Duggins, Pat (2007). Final Countdown: NASA and the End of the Space Shuttle Program. United States of America: University Press of Florida. ISBN 978-0-8130-3146-0.
- Goodwin, Robert (2001). Space Shuttle – STS Flights 1-5 – The NASA Mission Reports. Canada: Apogee Books. ISBN 1-896522-69-6.
- Heppenheimer, T.A. (2002). Development of the Space Shuttle: 1972–1981. United States of America: Smithsonian Press. ISBN 978-1-58834-009-2.
- Jenkins, Dennis R. (2007). Space Shuttle: The History of the National Space Transportation System. Voyageur Press. ISBN 978-0-9633974-5-4.
