= Kenneth S. Reightler Jr. =

American astronaut (born 1951)

Kenneth Reightler
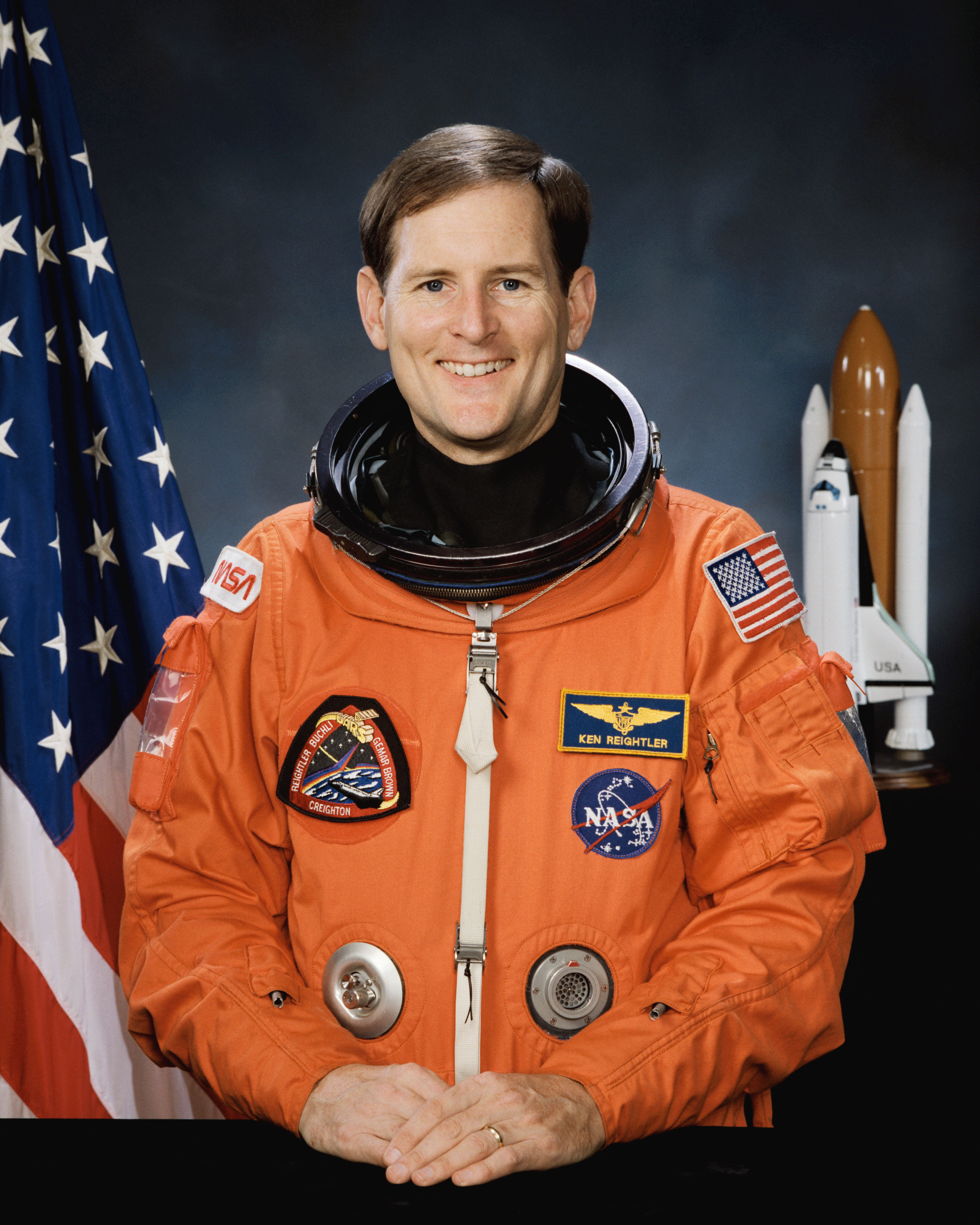
- Born: Kenneth Stanley Reightler Jr. March 24, 1951 (age 75); Patuxent River, Maryland, U.S.
- Education: United States Naval Academy (BS); Naval Postgraduate School (MS); University of Southern California (MS)
- Space career

NASA astronaut
- Rank: Captain, USN
- Time in space: 13d 15h 36m
- Selection: NASA Group 12 (1987)
- Missions: STS-48; STS-60
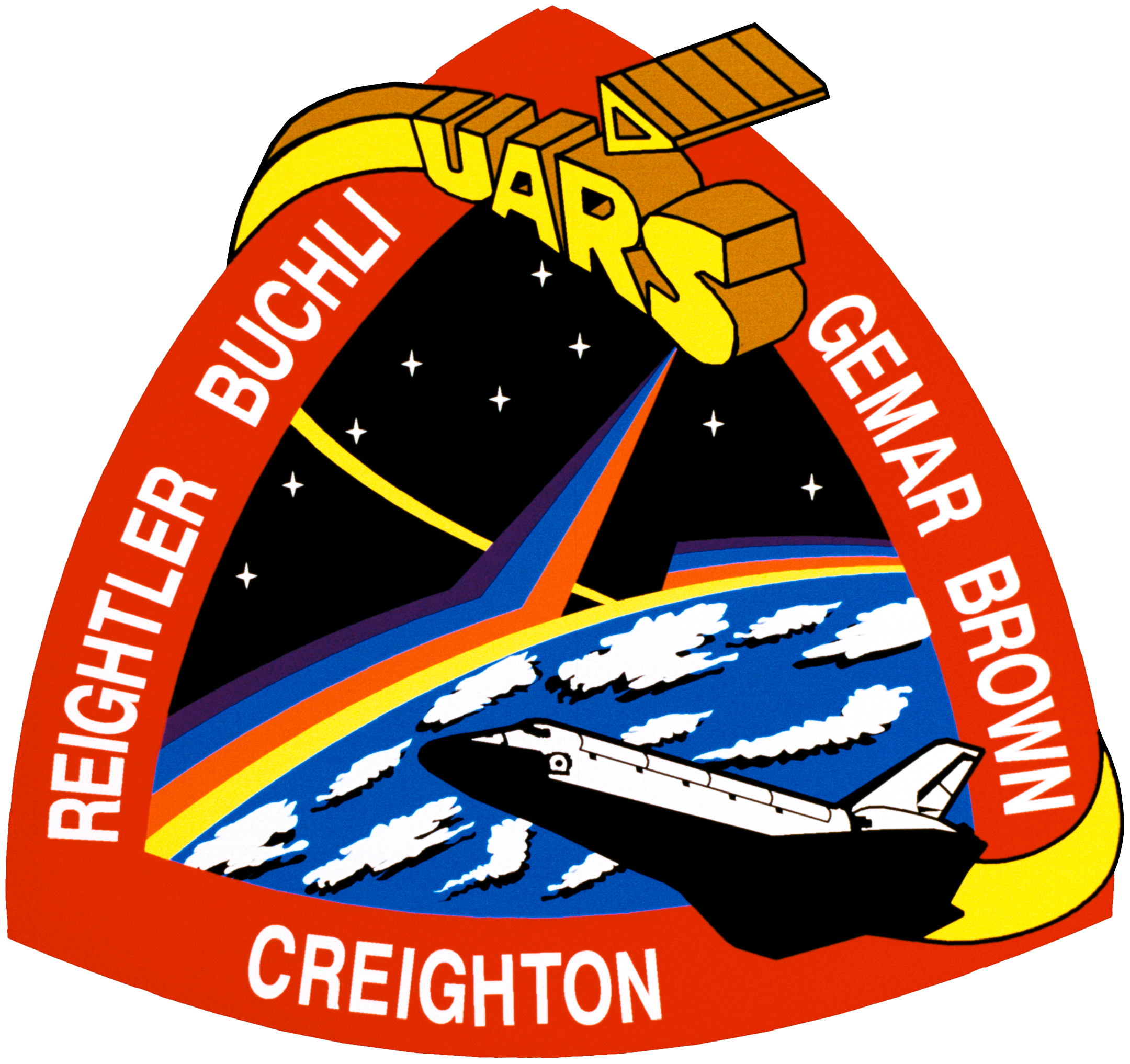
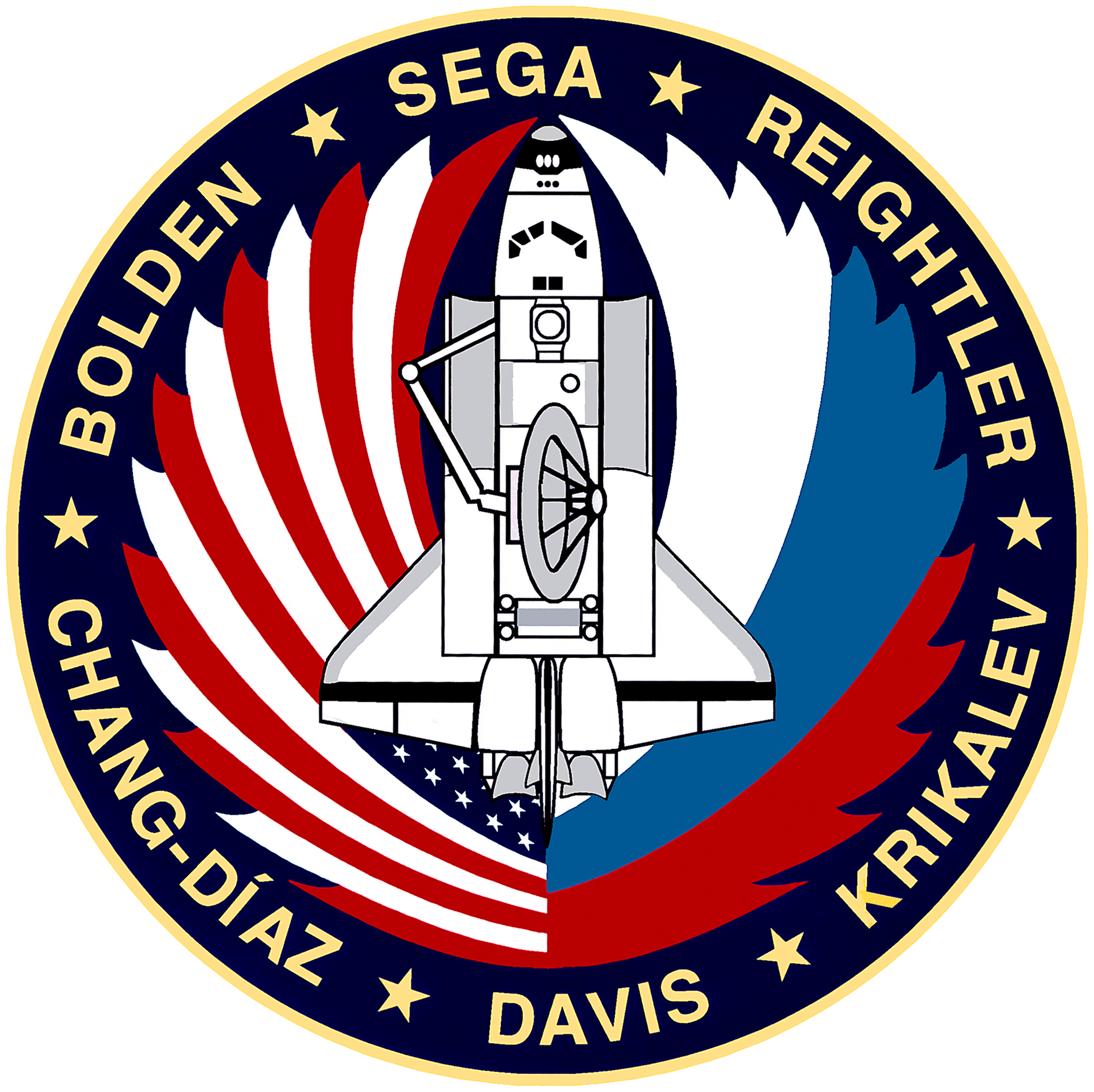
- Mission insignia

Kenneth Stanley Reightler Jr. (born March 24, 1951) is a former NASA astronaut.

== Early life and education ==
Reightler was born March 24, 1951, in Patuxent River, Maryland, but considers Virginia Beach, Virginia, to be his hometown. Married to the former Maureen Ellen McHenry, a psychotherapist; they have two daughters. He enjoys sailing, especially racing Chesapeake Bay Log Canoes, reading, music, hiking, and travel. His father, Mr. Kenneth S. Reightler Sr., and mother, Evelyn, are deceased. Maureen's mother, Mrs. Jean W. McHenry, and her father, Commander William H. McHenry (USN), are deceased. He graduated from Bayside High School, Virginia Beach, in 1969, and received a Bachelor of Science degree in Aerospace Engineering from United States Naval Academy in 1973. He received Master of Science degrees in 1984, in Aeronautical Engineering from the U.S. Naval Postgraduate School and in Systems Management from University of Southern California.

== Experience ==
Reightler was designated a Naval Aviator in August 1974 at Corpus Christi, Texas. After replacement pilot training in the P-3C airplane, he reported to Patrol Squadron 16 (VP-16) in Jacksonville, Florida, serving as both a mission commander and patrol plane commander. He made deployments to Keflavík, Iceland, and to Sigonella, Sicily. Following jet transition training, Reightler attended the U.S. Naval Test Pilot School at NAS Patuxent River, Maryland.

Upon graduation in 1978, he remained at the Naval Air Test Center where he served as test pilot and project officer for a variety of flight test programs involving the P-3, S-3, and T-39 airplanes. He later returned to the Test Pilot School, serving as a flight test instructor and safety officer flying the P-3, T-2, OV-1, T-39, and TA-7 airplanes. In June 1981 Reightler was assigned to the aircraft carrier USS Dwight D. Eisenhower as communications officer and carrier on-board delivery pilot, making two deployments to the Mediterranean Sea.

Selected for postgraduate education, he attended the U.S. Naval Postgraduate School in Monterey, California. Redesignated an Aerospace Engineering Duty Officer (AEDO), he was sent to transition training for the F/A-18 airplane with Strike Fighter Squadron 125 (VFA-125) at NAS Lemoore, California. He then reported for duty at the Test Pilot School in March 1985, serving as the chief flight instructor until his selection for the astronaut program.

He has logged over 5,000 hours flying time in over 60 different types of aircraft.

== NASA experience ==
Selected by NASA in June 1987, Reightler began a year of astronaut candidate training and became an astronaut in August 1988.

From September 12 – 18, 1991, he was the pilot on the crew of STS-48. This was the first Space Shuttle flight in support of "Mission to Planet Earth." During the five-day mission, the crew aboard the Space Shuttle Discovery successfully deployed the Upper Atmosphere Research Satellite (UARS), designed to provide scientists with their first complete data set on the upper atmosphere's chemistry, winds and energy inputs. The crew also conducted numerous secondary experiments ranging from growing protein crystals, to studying how fluids and structures react in weightlessness. After 81 orbits of the Earth, Discovery landed at Edwards Air Force Base, California.

More recently, Reightler served as pilot on STS-60, the first joint U.S./Russian Space Shuttle Mission. Launching from the Kennedy Space Center on February 3, 1994, STS-60 was the first flight of the Wake Shield Facility (WSF-1) and the second flight of the SpaceHab (Spacehab-2). During the eight-day flight, the crew of Discovery, including Russian cosmonaut Sergei Krikalev, conducted a wide variety of biological, materials science, earth observation, and life science experiments. Following 130 orbits of the Earth, STS-60 landed at Kennedy Space Center on February 11, 1994.

With the completion of his second mission, Reightler has logged over 327 hours in space.

His technical assignments to date have included: Chief of the Astronaut Office Space Station Branch; Chief of the Astronaut Office Mission Support Branch; Lead Spacecraft Communicator (CAPCOM); Lead Astronaut for flight software development and computer systems; Flight Crew Operations Directorate representative to the Program Requirements Control Board; weather coordinator for Space Shuttle launches and landings; Astronaut Office representative in the areas of ascent, entry, and aborts.

== Corporate experience ==
In 1995, Reightler left NASA and retired from the U.S. Navy with the rank of Captain. He joined Lockheed Martin as the Program Manager for the Engineering, Test, and Analysis contract at the Johnson Space Center. He was then promoted to Vice President of the Science, Engineering, Analysis, and Test (SEAT) Operation providing engineering and science services to NASA and other government and foreign customers, including the prime engineering and science contract at the Johnson Space Center. In 2001, he was promoted to Senior Vice President (COO) of Lockheed Martin Space Operations, the corporation's organization responsible for providing technical services (engineering, science, and operations) to the Civil Space business sector and related government and foreign customers. He held a dual assignment as Vice President and Program Manager for NASA's Consolidated Space Operations Contract (CSOC) for the final year and one half of the contract. CSOC was responsible for managing all of NASA's communication and data services including the Deep Space Network, Space Network, Ground Network and Mission Control Centers. Reightler was promoted to President of Lockheed Martin Space Operations in 2004. During this period, he was successful in creating internal partnerships within Lockheed Martin that resulted in winning several important NASA competitions including the NASA Crew Exploration Vehicle (Orion) contract. With this win, he took the opportunity to transfer within Lockheed Martin from technical services to development. In December 2006, Reightler became the Vice President, NASA Program Integration for the Lockheed Martin Space Systems Co., Human Space Flight. Reightler left Lockheed Martin in February 2011 to become the Vice President, Engineering Services for ATK Space Systems Division. In August 2012 he left ATK to join the faculty of the U.S. Naval Academy. He continues to be an independent aerospace and business consultant to government and commercial organizations.

== Academic experience ==
In 2012, Reightler was selected as the Robert A. Heinlein Distinguished Professor of Aerospace Engineering at the U.S. Naval Academy. Reightler became the inaugural Tig H. Krekel, Class of '75, Distinguished Chair in Space Science at the U.S. Naval Academy in 2017. He serves as a volunteer coach for the Naval Academy's Varsity Offshore Sailing Team and an Instructor-skipper and Officer in Tactical Command for the Offshore Sail Training Squadron.

== Organizations ==
Associate Fellow, American Institute of Aeronautics and Astronautics; Associate Fellow, Society of Experimental Test Pilots (SETP); Association of Space Explorers (ASE); U.S. Naval Academy Alumni Association; American Astronautical Society.

== Special honors ==
Defense Superior Service Medal; Legion of Merit; Defense Meritorious Service Medal; Navy Commendation Medal; Navy Unit Commendation; Meritorious Unit Commendation; Armed Forces Expeditionary Medal; National Defense Service Medal; NASA Exceptional Service Medal; two NASA Space Flight Medals; Johnson Space Center Certificate of Commendation; NASA Group Achievement Award; Intelsat EVA Recovery Team Award. Distinguished graduate, U.S. Naval Academy and U.S. Naval Test Pilot School. Absolute world altitude record for Class P aero-spacecraft. Mac Short Award in Aviation from U.S. Naval Academy (1973). Distinguished Alumni Award from U.S. Naval Postgraduate School. George M. Low Award. Member, Virginia Aviation Hall of Fame. Challenger Seven Award from the Challenger Center for Space Science Education. Reightler is an Eagle Scout. He also appeared on the Barney & Friends home video "Barney In Outer Space", and the film, "To Be an Astronaut". He was a technical advisor for the film Apollo 13.
