= STS-69 =

1995 American crewed spaceflight

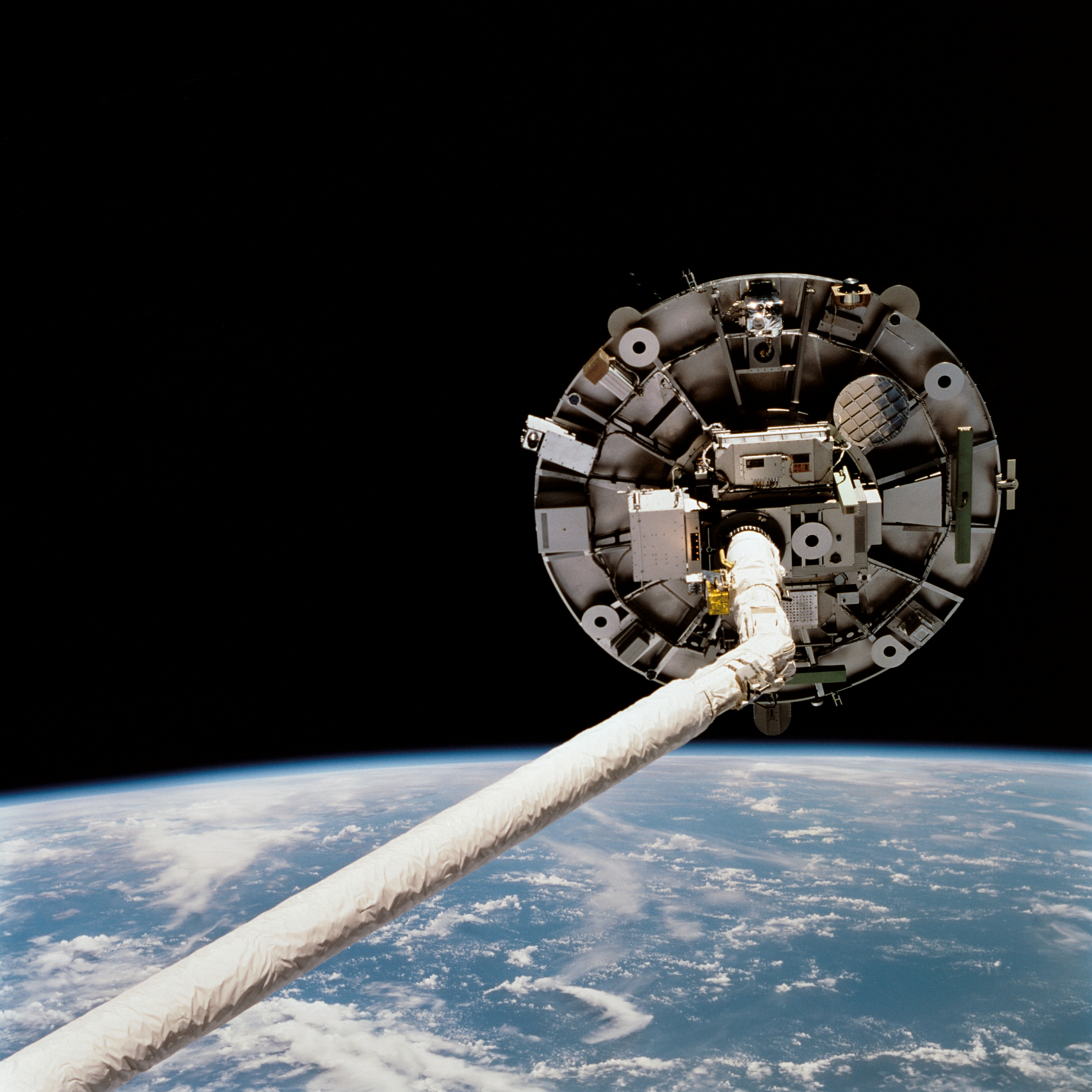
- Endeavour's Canadarm grapples the Wake Shield Facility, prior to its deployment
- Names: Space Transportation System-69
- Mission type: Research
- Operator: NASA
- COSPAR ID: 1995-048A
- SATCAT no.: 23667
- Mission duration: 10 days, 20 hours, 29 minutes, 56 seconds
- Distance travelled: 7,200,000 kilometres (4,500,000 mi)
- Orbits completed: 171

Spacecraft properties
- Spacecraft: Space Shuttle Endeavour
- Payload mass: 11,499 kg (25,351 lb)

Crew
- Crew size: 5
- Members: David M. Walker; Kenneth Cockrell; James S. Voss; James H. Newman; Michael L. Gernhardt

Start of mission
- Launch date: 7 September 1995, 15:09:00 UTC
- Launch site: Kennedy, LC-39A

End of mission
- Landing date: 18 September 1995, 11:38:56 UTC
- Landing site: Kennedy, SLF Runway 33

Orbital parameters
- Reference system: Geocentric
- Regime: Low Earth
- Perigee altitude: 321 kilometres (199 mi)
- Apogee altitude: 321 kilometres (199 mi)
- Inclination: 28.4 degrees
- Period: 91.4 min
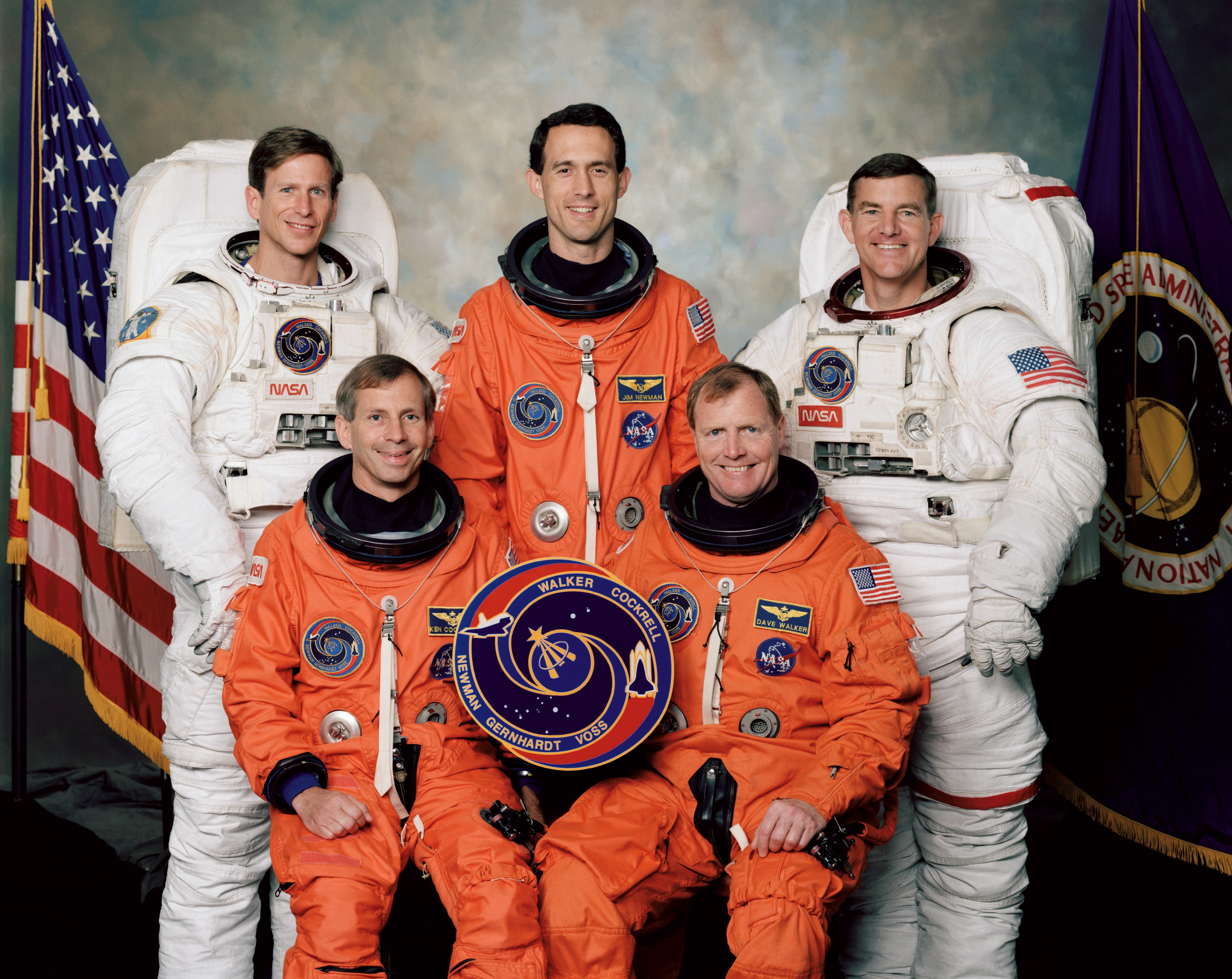
- STS-69 mission patch Left to right – Seated: Cockrell, Walker; Standing: Gernhardt, Newman, Voss Space Shuttle program

STS-69 was a Space Shuttle Endeavour mission, and the second flight of the Wake Shield Facility (WSF). The mission launched from Kennedy Space Center, Florida on 7 September 1995.

== Crew ==
Position	Astronaut
Commander	David M. Walker; Fourth and last spaceflight
Pilot	Kenneth Cockrell; Second spaceflight
Mission Specialist 1	James S. Voss; Third spaceflight
Mission Specialist 2 Flight Engineer	James H. Newman; Second spaceflight
Mission Specialist 3	Michael L. Gernhardt; First spaceflight

=== Spacewalks ===
EVA 1 – Voss and Gernhardt

- EVA 1 Start: 16 September 1995 – 08:20 UTC
- EVA 1 End: 16 September 1995 – 15:06 UTC
- Duration: 6 hours, 46 minutes

=== Crew seat assignments ===
Seat	Launch	Landing	Seats 1–4 are on the flight deck. Seats 5–7 are on the mid-deck.
1	Walker		Seats 1–4 are on the flight deck. Seats 5–7 are on the mid-deck.
2	Cockrell		Seats 1–4 are on the flight deck. Seats 5–7 are on the mid-deck.
3	Voss	Gernhardt	Seats 1–4 are on the flight deck. Seats 5–7 are on the mid-deck.
4	Newman		Seats 1–4 are on the flight deck. Seats 5–7 are on the mid-deck.
5	Gernhardt	Voss	Seats 1–4 are on the flight deck. Seats 5–7 are on the mid-deck.
6	Unused		Seats 1–4 are on the flight deck. Seats 5–7 are on the mid-deck.
7	Unused		Seats 1–4 are on the flight deck. Seats 5–7 are on the mid-deck.

== Mission highlights ==
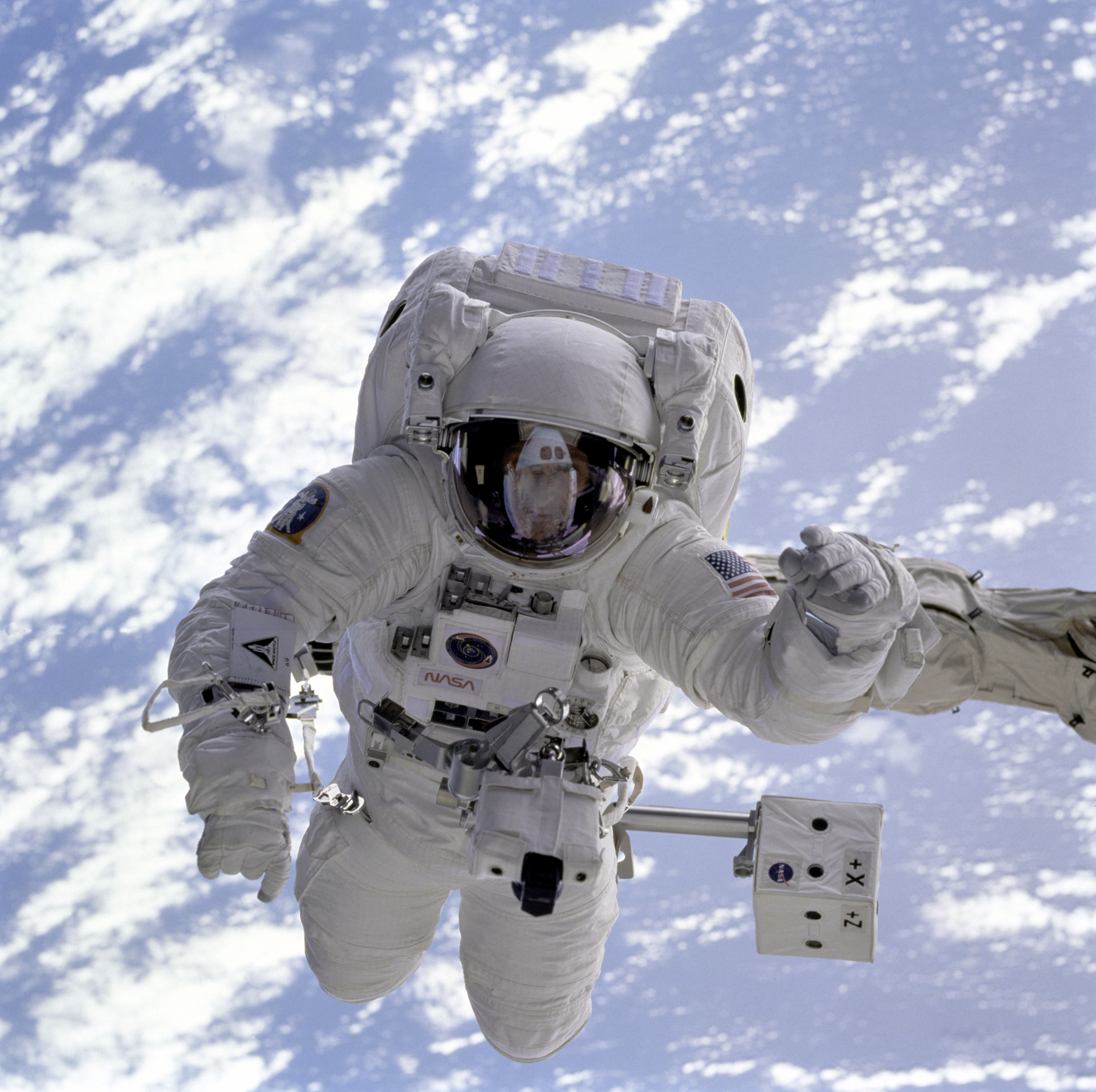
The pale blue Earth serves as a backdrop for astronaut Michael Gernhardt, who is attached to the Shuttle Endeavour's robot arm during a spacewalk on the STS-69 mission in 1995. Unlike earlier spacewalking astronauts, Gernhardt was able to use an electronic cuff checklist, a prototype developed for the assembly of the International Space Station.

Attempt	Planned	Result	Turnaround	Reason	Decision point	Weather go (%)	Notes
1	31 Aug 1995, 11:04:00 am	Scrubbed	—	Technical	31 Aug 1995, 3:30 am (T−06:00:00 hold)		High condenser exit temperature in fuel cell #2.
2	7 Sep 1995, 11:09:00 am	Success	7 days 0 hours 5 minutes				

The 11-day mission was the second flight of the Wake Shield Facility (WSF), a saucer-shaped satellite that was to fly free of the Shuttle for several days. The purpose of the WSF was to grow thin films in a near perfect vacuum created by the wake of the satellite as it moved through space. The crew also deployed and retrieved the Spartan 201 astronomy satellite, performed a six-hour spacewalk to test assembly techniques for the international Space Station and tested thermal improvements made to spacesuits used during space walks.

The Spartan 201 free-flyer made its third flight aboard the Shuttle. The Spartan 201 mission was a scientific research effort aimed at the investigation of the interaction between the Sun and its outflowing wind of charged particles. Spartan's goal was to study the outer atmosphere of the Sun and its transition into the solar wind that constantly flows past the Earth.

STS-69 saw the first flight of the International Extreme Ultraviolet Hitchhiker (IEH-1), the first of five planned flights to measure and monitor long-term variations in the magnitude of absolute extreme ultraviolet (EUV) flux coming from the Sun, and to study EUV emissions from the plasma torus system around Jupiter originating from its moon Io.

Also aboard Endeavour were the combined Capillary Pumped Loop-2/Gas Bridge Assembly (CAPL-2/GBA) payload. This experiment consisted of the CAPL-2 Hitchhiker payload designed as an in-orbit microgravity demonstration of a cooling system planned for the Earth Observing System Program and the Thermal Energy Storage-2 payload, part of an effort to develop advanced energy generation techniques. Also a part of this payload were several Getaway Special (GAS) experiments which investigated areas such as the interaction of spacecraft attitude and orbit control systems with spacecraft structures, fluid-filled beams as structural dampers in space and the effects of smoldering combustion in a long-term microgravity environment.

Another payload flown with a connection to the development of the Space Station was the Electrolysis Performance Improvement Concept Study (EPICS). Supply of oxygen and hydrogen by electrolyzing water in space plays an important role in meeting NASA's needs and goals for future space missions. On-board generation of oxygen was expected to reduce the annual resupply requirement for the Space Station by approximately 5,400 kilograms (11,900 lb).

Other payloads aboard were the National Institutes of Health- Cells-4 (NIH-C4) experiment that investigates bone loss during space flight; the Biological Research in Canister-6 (BRIC-6) that studies the gravity-sensing mechanism within mammalian cells. Also flying were two commercial experiments. (CMIX-4) whose objectives included analysis of cell change in microgravity along with studies of neuro-muscular development disorders and the Commercial Generic Bioprocessing Apparatus-7 (CGBA-7). CGBA was a secondary payload that served as an incubator and data collection point for experiments in pharmaceuticals testing and biomedicine, bioprocessing and biotechnology, agriculture and the environment.

The Thermal Energy Storage (TES-2) experiment was also part of the CAPL-2/GBA-6. The TES-2 payload was designed to provide data for understanding the long-duration behavior of thermal energy storage fluoride salts that undergo repeated melting and freezing in microgravity. The TES-2 payload was designed to study the microgravity behavior of voids in lithium fluoride–calcium fluoride eutectic, a thermal energy storage salt. Data from this experiment would validate a computer code called TESSIM, useful for the analysis of heat receivers in advanced solar dynamic power system designs.

== See also ==
- List of human spaceflights
- List of Space Shuttle missions
- Outline of space science
- Space Shuttle
