= STS-60 =

1994 American crewed spaceflight

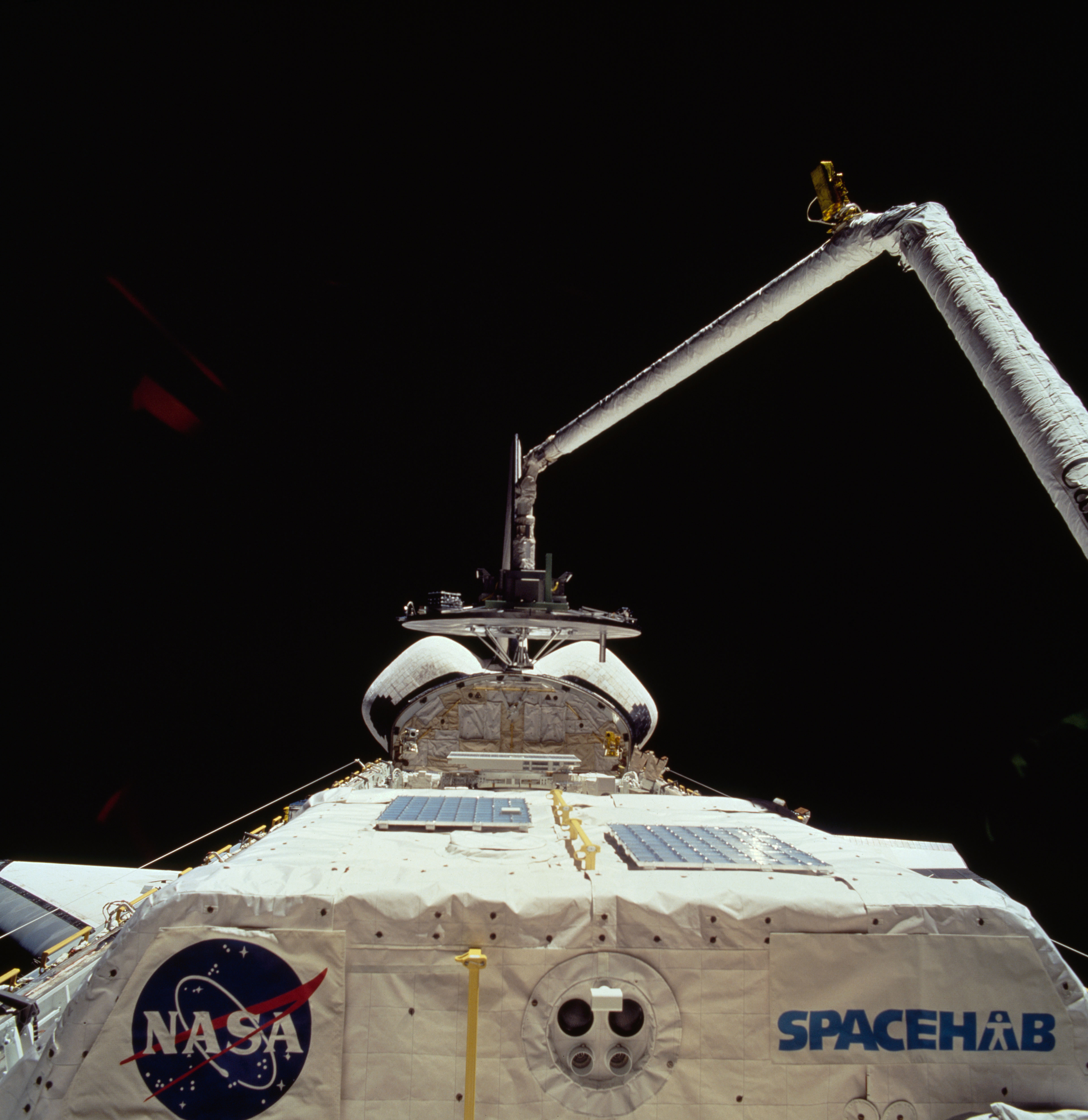
- The SPACEHAB-2 in Discovery's payload bay, as Canadarm grapples the Wake Shield Facility (WSF-1).
- Names: Space Transportation System-60
- Mission type: Microgravity research
- Operator: NASA
- COSPAR ID: 1994-006A
- SATCAT no.: 22977
- Mission duration: 8 days, 7 hours, 9 minutes, 22 seconds
- Distance travelled: 5,535,667 km (3,439,704 mi)
- Orbits completed: 130

Spacecraft properties
- Spacecraft: Space Shuttle Discovery
- Landing mass: 97,448 kg (214,836 lb)
- Payload mass: 10,231 kg (22,555 lb)

Crew
- Crew size: 6
- Members: Charles F. Bolden Jr.; Kenneth S. Reightler Jr.; N. Jan Davis; Ronald M. Sega; Franklin R. Chang-Díaz; Sergei K. Krikalev

Start of mission
- Launch date: February 3, 1994, 12:10:00 UTC
- Launch site: Kennedy, LC-39A
- Contractor: Rockwell International

End of mission
- Landing date: February 11, 1994, 19:19:22 UTC
- Landing site: Kennedy, SLF Runway 15

Orbital parameters
- Reference system: Geocentric orbit
- Regime: Low Earth orbit
- Perigee altitude: 348 km (216 mi)
- Apogee altitude: 351 km (218 mi)
- Inclination: 56.40°
- Period: 91.50 minutes

Instruments
- Astroculture (ASC-3); Bioserve Pilot Lab (BPL); Commercial Generic Bioprocessing Apparatus (CGBA); Commercial Protein Crystal Growth (CPCG); Controlled Liquid Phase Sintering Experiment (ECLiPSE-Hab); Getaway Special (GAS); Immune Response Studies Experiment (IMMUNE-01); Organic Separation (ORSEP); Space Acceleration Measurement System (SAMS); Space Experiment Facility (SEF); Three-Dimensional Microgravity Accelerometer (3-DMA)
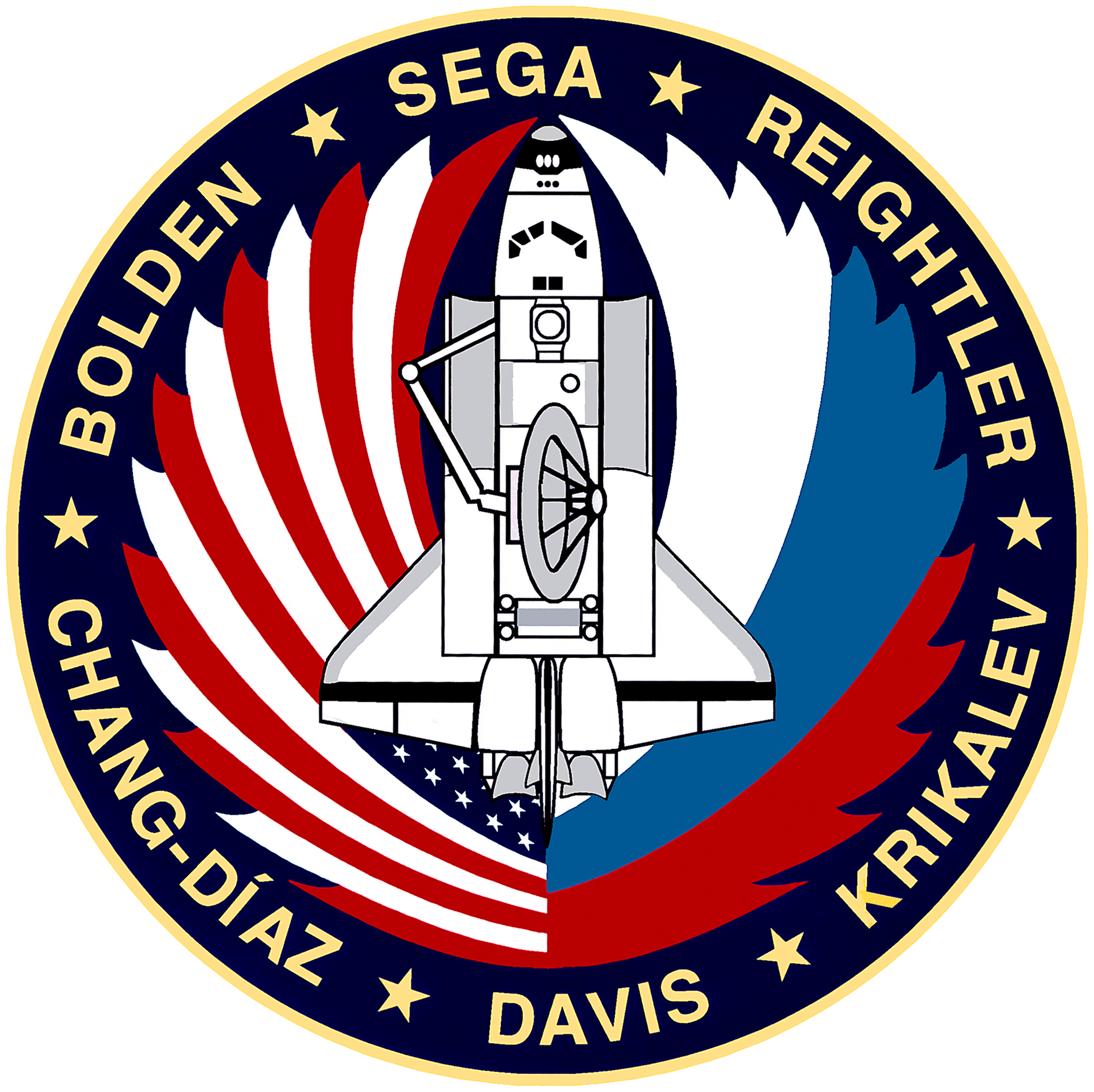
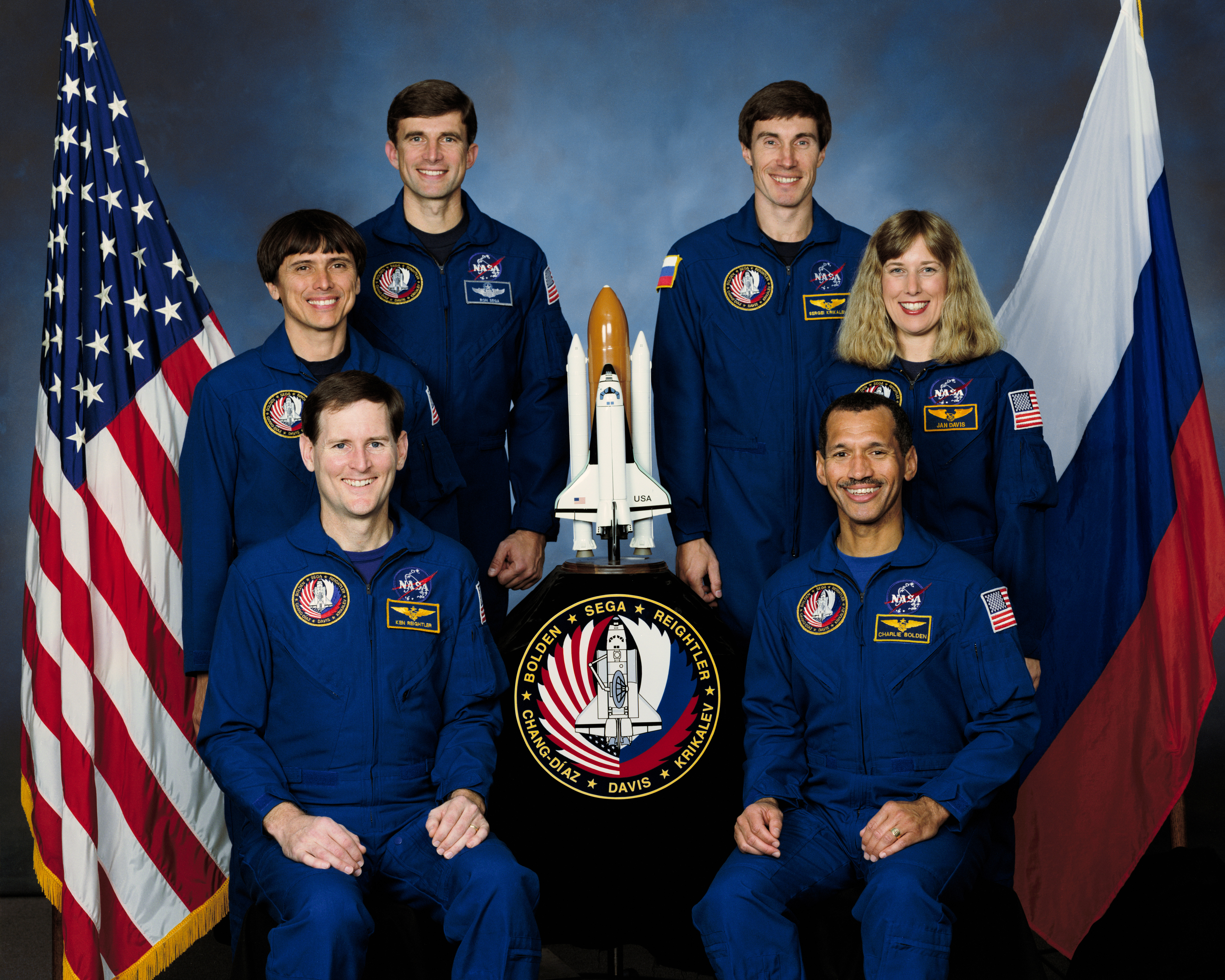
- STS-60 mission patch Clockwise from bottom left: Reightler, Chang-Díaz, Sega, Krikalev, Davis and Bolden Space Shuttle program

STS-60 was the first mission of the U.S./Russian Shuttle-Mir Program, and the 18th flight of Discovery, in which Sergei K. Krikalev became the first Russian cosmonaut to fly aboard a Space Shuttle. The mission used NASA Space Shuttle Discovery, which lifted off from Launch Pad 39A on February 3, 1994, from Kennedy Space Center, Florida. The mission carried the Wake Shield Facility experiment and a SPACEHAB module, developed by SPACEHAB Inc., into orbit, and carried out a live bi-directional audio and downlink link-up with the cosmonauts aboard the Russian space station Mir.

== Crew ==
| Position | Astronaut |
|---|---|
| Commander | (United States) Charles F. Bolden Jr. Fourth and last spaceflight |
| Pilot | (United States) Kenneth S. Reightler Jr. Second and last spaceflight |
| Mission Specialist 1 | (United States) N. Jan Davis; Second spaceflight |
| Mission Specialist 2 Flight Engineer | (United States) Ronald M. Sega; First spaceflight |
| Mission Specialist 3 | (United States) / (Costa Rica) Franklin Chang-Díaz; Fourth spaceflight |
| Mission Specialist 4 | (Russia) Sergei K. Krikalev, RKA; Third spaceflight |

=== Crew seat assignments ===
| Seat | Launch | Landing | Seats 1–4 are on the flight deck. Seats 5–7 are on the mid-deck. |
| 1 | Bolden | | Seats 1–4 are on the flight deck. Seats 5–7 are on the mid-deck. |
| 2 | Reightler | | Seats 1–4 are on the flight deck. Seats 5–7 are on the mid-deck. |
| 3 | Davis | Chang-Diaz | Seats 1–4 are on the flight deck. Seats 5–7 are on the mid-deck. |
| 4 | Sega | | Seats 1–4 are on the flight deck. Seats 5–7 are on the mid-deck. |
| 5 | Chang-Diaz | Davis | Seats 1–4 are on the flight deck. Seats 5–7 are on the mid-deck. |
| 6 | Krikalev | | Seats 1–4 are on the flight deck. Seats 5–7 are on the mid-deck. |
| 7 | Unused | | Seats 1–4 are on the flight deck. Seats 5–7 are on the mid-deck. |

== Mission highlights ==
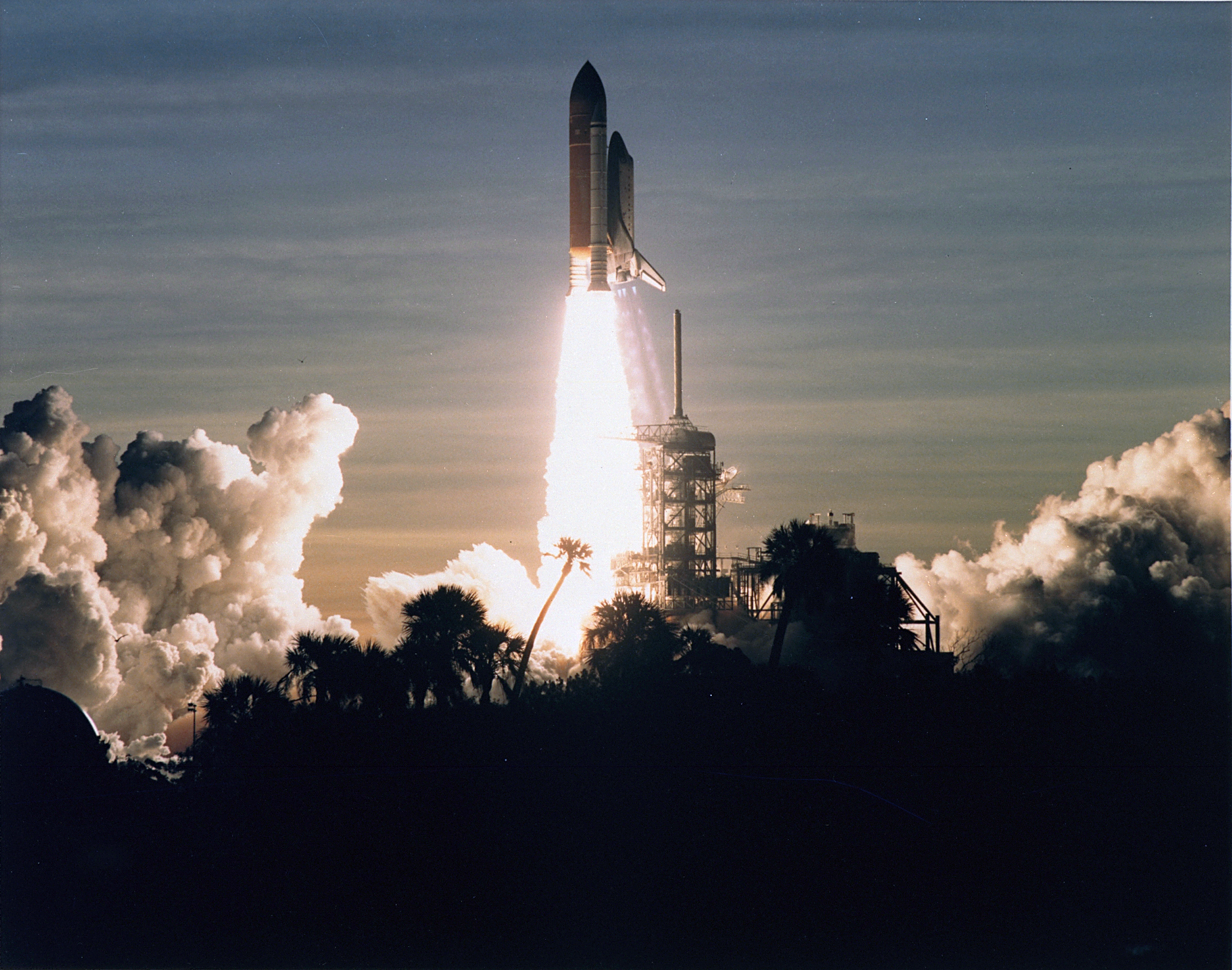
Launch of STS-60

After External Tank (ET) separation and main engine cutoff (MECO), a 2.5 minutes OMS burn was initiated at 12:52 UTC that circularized Discovery's orbit from a 74 by 352 km (46 by 219 mi) orbit to 353 by 352 km (219 by 219 mi). Shortly after liftoff, pilot Kenneth S. Reightler Jr. experienced problems with his portable headset. The problem was traced to the Headset Interface Unit (HIU) and that unit was swapped with a flight spare. The payload bay doors were opened and around 13:45 UTC the crew was given a go for on-orbit operations. Shortly after reaching orbit, the STS-60 crew began checking Discovery's systems and activating the commercially developed SPACEHAB laboratory module and several of its experiments. The crew also activated one group of the payload bay Getaway Special (GAS) canisters.

SPACEHAB module experiments that were activated included the Organic Separations payload, which is designed to investigate cell separation techniques for possible pharmaceutical and biotechnology processing, and the Equipment for Controlled Liquid Phase Sintering Experiment (ECLiPSE) package, a furnace designed to explore the possibilities of creating stronger, lighter and more durable metals for use in bearings, cutting tools and electronics. SPACEHAB middeck experiments that were activated included Immune-1, which will look at the immune systems of rats in orbit, and the Commercial Protein Crystal Growth package, which is attempting to grow large, well- ordered protein crystals so that their structures can be more easily studied. The crew sleep period then began at 6:10 pm EST.

At 11:30 UTC on February 5, 1994, Discovery inadvertently flew through a cloud of wastewater ice crystals. Flight controllers determined that approximately one tablespoon of wastewater leaked out of a waste dump nozzle.

The Wake Shield Facility deployment operation was canceled on February 5, 1994. This delay was the result of several factors, including radio interference and an inability to read the Wake Shield Facility's status lights when the orbiter's payload bay is in full sunlight. Deployment originally was scheduled for 16:00 UTC, but after grappling the free-flyer and lifting it out of the cargo bay and into the pre-deploy position, crew members and investigators on the ground were unable to tell whether power and transmitter status lights were giving the proper indications. After determining that the problem was not a systems failure, but difficulty in reading the status lights, the crew and flight controllers prepared for another release attempt. Interference between the radio transmitter on the Wake Shield Facility and the receiver on its payload bay carrier resulted in a one-day delay.

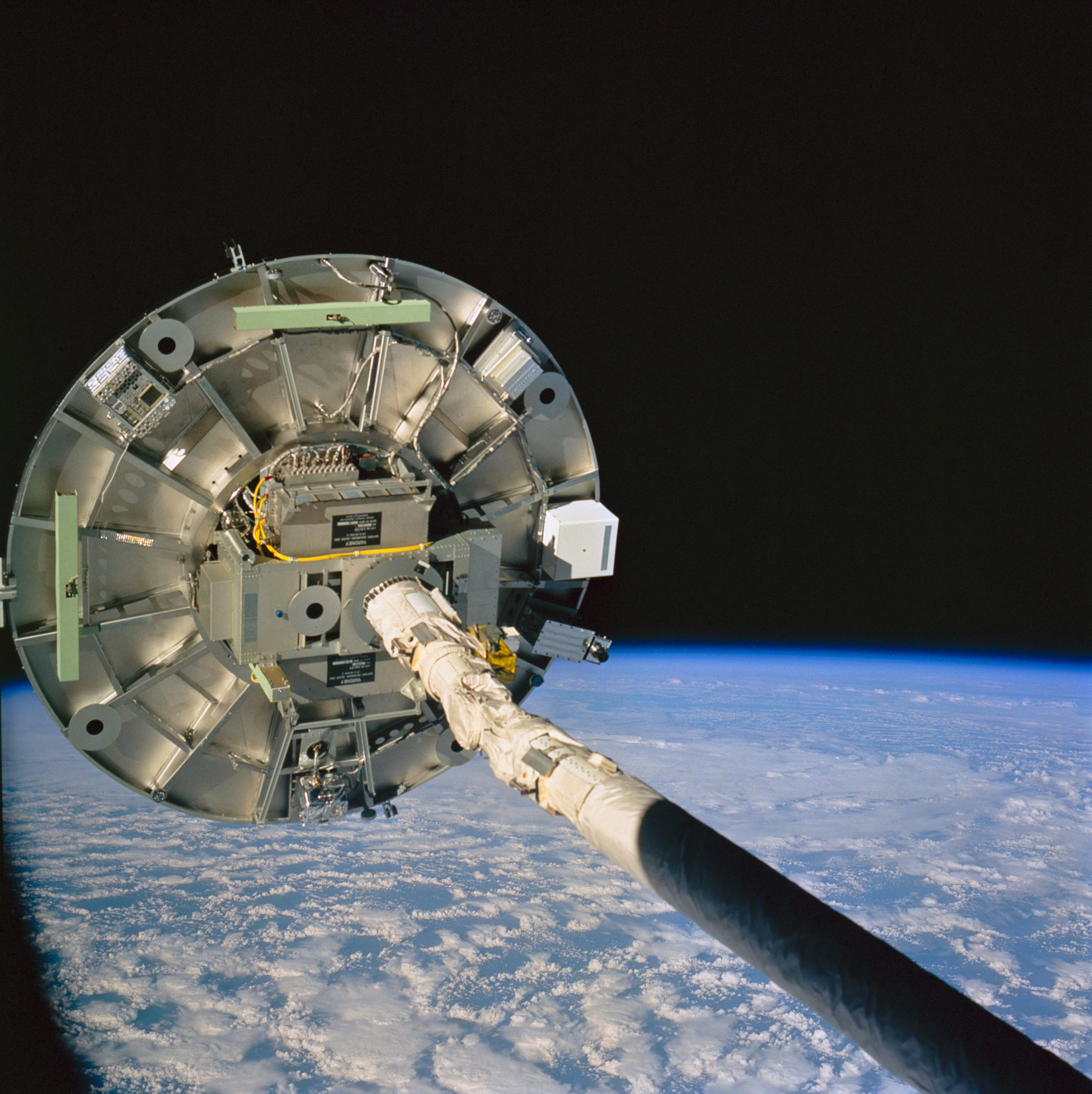
The Wake Shield Facility grappled by the Canadarm.

Wake Shield Facility deployment was also canceled on February 6, 1994, during its orbit 53 opportunity at 17:25 UTC, WSF and flight controllers worked on problems with the Pitch and Roll sensors on WSF's Attitude, Direction and Control system. Astronaut Jan Davis moved the wrist joint on the Remote Manipulator System (RMS) arm (Canadarm) to try to point WSF's Horizon Sensor into the Sun in an attempt to warm up the sensor's electronics package. The last deployment opportunity for on February 6, 1994, was a 50-minute window beginning at 19:23 UTC on orbit 54 but WSF was not ready. It was left mounted on the Canadarm during the crew sleep period while ground controllers considered their options. On its perch at the end of the RMS over night, WSF was able to grow 2 Gallium Arsenide (GaAs) thin films. The next deployment opportunity on February 7, 1994, would have been during orbit 67 but payload controllers and flight controllers determined that there would be insufficient time to safely develop contingency procedures in the event that WSF was unable to maintain stable attitude control without the use of its Horizon Sensor. It was decided that for the remainder of the mission, all WSF operations would take place at the end of the Canadarm and there would be no WSF free-flying operations on the mission.

On February 7, 1994, work had been progressing in the SPACEHAB-2 module on a number of experiments. These included the Three-Dimensional Microgravity Accelerometer (3-DMA) experiment, Astroculture experiment (ASC-3), Bioserve Pilot Lab (BPL), Commercial Generic Bioprocessing Apparatus experiment (CGBA), Commercial Protein Crystal Growth experiment (CPCG), Controlled Liquid Phase Sintering-Hab (ECLiPSE-Hab), Immune Response Studies Experiment (IMMUNE-01), Organic Separation experiment (ORSEP), Space Experiment Facility (SEF), Penn State Biomodule (PSB) and the Space Acceleration Measurement System (SAMS) Experiment. Sergei Krikalev had been operating the SAMS experiment.

At 12:38 UTC on February 8, 1994, Good Morning America performed a live bi-directional audio and downlink video hookup between astronauts on board Discovery and 3 cosmonauts on board the Russian Mir Space Station. Discovery was over the Pacific Ocean and Mir was over the southern United States. Afterwards, work progressed with SPACEHAB-2 module and middeck experiments while Wake Shield Facility continued operations at the end of the Canadarm. A slight problem developed with the status indicators on the 3-DMA experiment and the crew downlinked video to aid in troubleshooting. The astronauts ended Flight Day 6 at 00:10 UTC (February 9, 1994).

Flight Day 7 (February 9, 1994) began at 08:20 UTC. ODERACS operations were scheduled for 14:55 UTC during Orbit 97 and BREMSAT deploy was scheduled for 19:50 UTC. The WSF experiment was brought to an end and a telemetry problem with the facility prevented the growth of the 6th and final thin film on board WSF. Five other thin films were grown throughout the mission before Wake Shield Facility was berthed. WSF closeout was completed by 13:10 UTC. At 12:58 UTC, commander Charles F. Bolden reported to the ground that one of the Thermal Protection System (TPS) blankets around Discovery's forward RCS thruster below Bolden's cabin window was slightly peeled back. Jan Davis was directed to halt her power down and stowage of the Remote Manipulator System (Canadarm) and use the arm to perform a camera survey of the front left side of the orbiter. At 19:20 UTC, the BREMSAT satellite momentum wheel was spun up and BREMSAT was ejected into space at 19:23 UTC at the rate of 1 m/s (3.3 ft/s).

On Flight Day 8 (February 10, 1994), the astronauts performed a number of operations to prepare Discovery for its trip home. These included Hot-Fire tests of all 44 Reaction Control Systems jets, Flight control system checkout, SAREX stow, CPCG Stow, ASC-3 Deactivation, ORSEP Deactivation, stowage of all non-essential cabin items and Ku-Band antenna stow. Flight Day 9 (February 11, 1994) operations included the powerup of all critical orbiter entry systems (Group B powerup), SAMS deactivation, CAPL Deactivation and De-Orbit preps. Ground controllers gave Discovery a go to start SPACEHAB deactivation at 13:00 UTC and this was complete by 15:20 UTC. Landing was at KSC runway 15 at 19:18:41 UTC.

== See also ==
- List of human spaceflights
- List of Space Shuttle missions
- Outline of space science
- Space Shuttle
