= Center for Advanced Materials, University of Houston =

US research laboratory

Coordinates: 29.72266°N 95.34514°W

The Center for Advanced Materials (CAM), formerly the Space Vacuum Epitaxy Center, is a laboratory established in 1986 at the University of Houston for researching the science and application of advanced materials. It is hosted in 8,000 square feet (740 m^{2}) of space in three buildings on the Houston campus. Its facilities contain equipment dedicated to thin-film deposition, processing and characterization of III-V compound semiconductors, high-temperature superconductivity, and ferroelectric oxide material systems. The Wake Shield Facility was developed at this center.

Today, CAM’s research focuses on energy materials, nanoelectronics, and materials at the physical-biological interface, with an emphasis on sustainability and industry applications.

== Research Focus ==
CAM’s current research is focused in the following key areas:

- Energy Materials – Photovoltaics, fuel cells, and supercapacitors.
- Nanoelectronics Materials – Graphene and resistive memory.
- Materials at the Physical-Biological Interface – Biosensors and detectors.
- Advanced Oxides – High-temperature superconductors and ferroelectric oxide systems.
- Optoelectronic Materials & 2D Systems – Thin films and semiconductor systems.
- Space Materials Science – Materials designed for performance in space environments.

As of March 2025, current projects include:

- Photovoltaics & Nanostructures – Developing advanced materials for improving solar cell efficiency.
- Nanoelectronics & Nanoenergetics Materials – Researching graphene-based materials and resistive memory systems.
- Advanced Oxides – Exploring superconductivity and other properties of oxide materials.
- Optoelectronic Materials & 2D Systems – Investigating thin-film and 2D material-based optoelectronics.
- Space Materials Science – Developing materials capable of withstanding extreme space environments.

== History ==
Since its founding, CAM has focused on both fundamental science and technological applications. The center’s ability to secure funding and industry partnerships has enabled it to play a key role in advancing materials science research and its applications.

Funding and Industry Partnerships

- CAM has historically garnered over $70 million in federal funds and a total of $104 million in cash and in-kind funding since its inception. The center has developed a major intellectual property (IP) marketing strategy, securing over $6.2 million in funding directly related to industry interest in CAM's IP.

== Operations ==
CAM operates under a project-based structure, where project leaders are responsible for the scientific, technical, and financial productivity of their research. This structure allows the center to effectively transition scientific advances into commercial applications, contributing to the center’s sustainability and economic impact.

CAM’s facilities, located in three buildings at the University of Houston, are dedicated to thin-film deposition, processing, and characterization of advanced materials. The equipment supports research in superconductivity, photovoltaics, nanoelectronics, and materials science.

== See also ==
- Epitaxy
