= Wake Shield Facility =

American scientific satellite

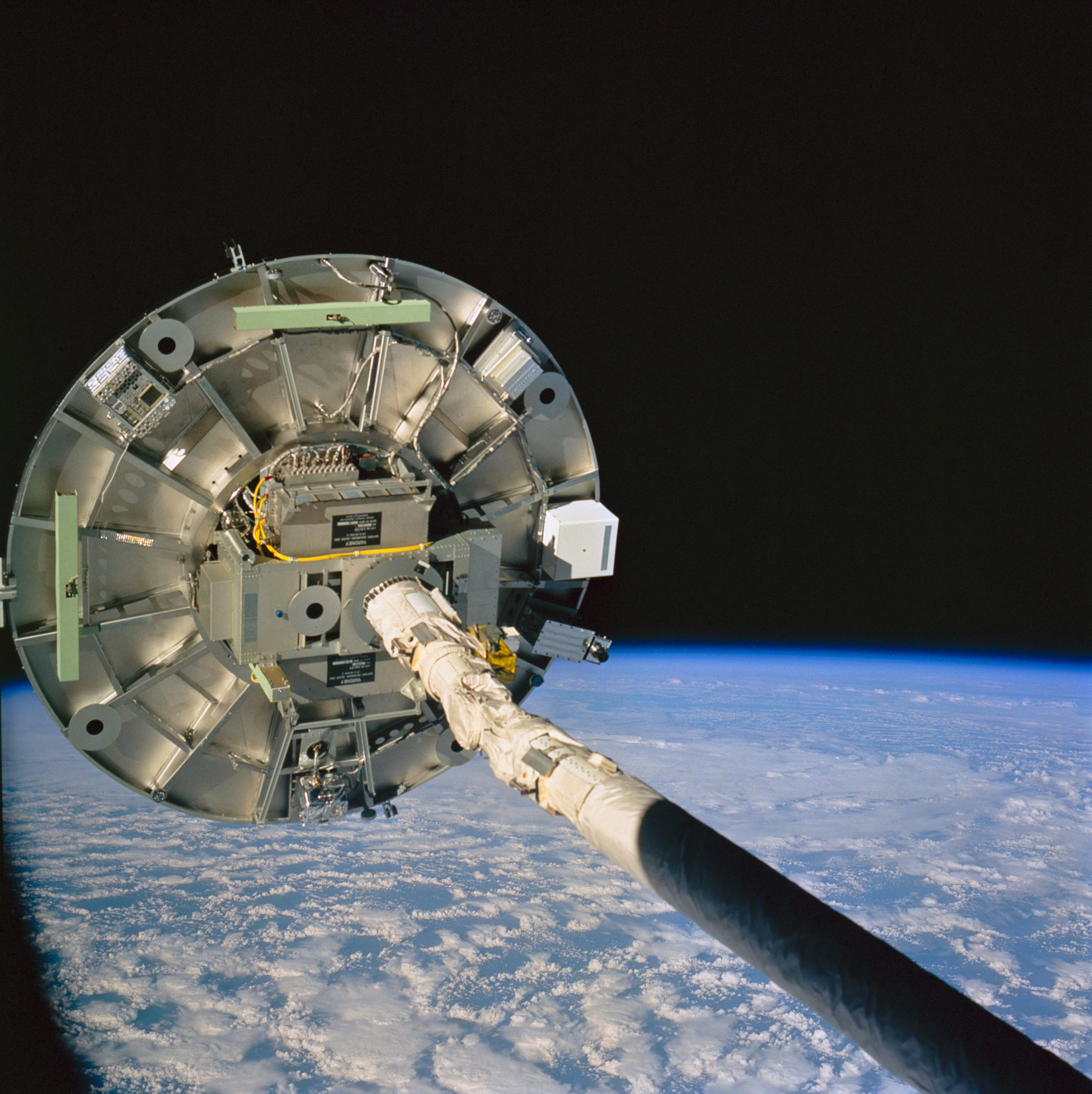
Deployment of the WSF using the Space Shuttle robotic arm, Canadarm

Wake Shield Facility (WSF) was a NASA experimental science platform that was placed in low Earth orbit by the Space Shuttle. It was a 3.7 m (12 ft) diameter, free-flying stainless steel disk.

The WSF was deployed using the Space Shuttle's Canadarm. The WSF then used nitrogen gas thrusters to position itself about 55 km (34 mi) behind the Space Shuttle, which was at an orbital altitude of over 300 km (190 mi), within the thermosphere, where the atmosphere is exceedingly tenuous. The WSF's orbital speed was at least three to four times faster than the speed of thermospheric gas molecules in the area, which resulted in a cone behind the WSF that was entirely free of gas molecules. The WSF thus created an ultrahigh vacuum in its wake. The resulting vacuum was used to study epitaxial film growth. The WSF operated at a distance from the Space Shuttle to avoid contamination from the Shuttle's rocket thrusters and water dumped overboard from the Shuttle's Waste Collection System (space toilet). After two days, the Space Shuttle would rendezvous with the WSF and again use its robotic arm to collect the WSF and to store it in the Shuttle's payload bay for return to Earth.

The WSF was flown into space three times, aboard Shuttle flights STS-60 (WSF-1), STS-69 (WSF-2) and STS-80 (WSF-3). During STS-60, some hardware issues were experienced, and, as a result, the WSF-1 was only deployed at the end of the Shuttle's Canadarm. During the later missions, the WSF was deployed as a free-flying platform in the wake of the Shuttle.

These flights proved the vacuum wake concept and realized the space epitaxy concept by growing the first-ever crystalline semiconductor thin films in the vacuum of space. These included gallium arsenide (GaAs) and aluminum gallium arsenide (AlGaAs) depositions. These experiments have been used to develop better photocells and thin films. Among the potential resulting applications are artificial retinas made from tiny ceramic detectors.

Pre-flight calculations suggested that the pressure on the wake side could be decreased by about 6 orders of magnitude over the ambient pressure in low Earth orbit (from 10^{−8} to 10^{−14} Torr). Analysis of the pressure and temperature data gathered from the two flights concluded that the decrease was about 2 orders of magnitude (4 orders of magnitude less than expected).

The WSF was sponsored by the Space Processing Division in NASA's Office of Life and Microgravity Sciences and Applications. It was designed, built and operated by the Space Vacuum Epitaxy Center, since renamed the Center for Advanced Materials, at the University of Houston, a NASA Commercial Space Center in conjunction with its industrial partner, Space Industries, Inc., also in Houston, Texas.

As of 2012, the Wake Shield Facility spacecraft is being preserved at the Center for Advanced Materials.

== See also ==
- Space manufacturing
