= Blaha =

Blaha (feminine: Blahová) and Bláha (feminine: Bláhová) are Czech and Slovak surnames. They were derived from the given names Blahoslav, Blahomil and Blažej. Notable people with the surnames include:

- Barbara Blaha (born 1983), Austrian writer
- Constantin Blaha (born 1987), Austrian diver
- Dagmar Bláhová (born 1949), Czech actress
- Eliška Bláhová (1884–1966), Czech dance educator
- František Bláha (1886–1945), Czech military leader
- George Blaha (born 1945), American broadcaster
- Gustav Blaha (1888–1961), Austrian footballer
- Inocenc Arnošt Bláha (1879–1960), Czech sociologist and philosopher
- Jana Blahová (born 1984), Czech sprint canoeist
- Jan Blaha (1938–2012), Czech Roman Catholic bishop
- John E. Blaha (born 1942), American astronaut
- Joseph C. Blaha (1877–1944), American businessman and politician
- Julie Blaha (born 1970), American politician and teacher
- Karel Bláha (born 1975), Czech sprinter
- Karel Bláha (singer) (1947–2025), Czech singer and actor
- Klára Bláhová (born 1973), Czech tennis player
- Kristýna Bláhová (born 2000), Czech ice hockey player
- Lubomír Blaha (born 1978), Czech footballer
- Ľuboš Blaha (born 1979), Slovak politician
- Lujza Blaha (1850–1926), Hungarian actress and singer
- Martin Bláha (born 1977), Czech cyclist
- Martin Blaha (footballer) (born 1985), Czech footballer
- Natália Blahová (born 1974), Slovak politician

== See also ==
- Blahová, a municipality and village in Slovakia
