= NASA Astronaut Group 13 =

1990 human spaceflight selection of 23 candidates; "The Hairballs"

The Hairballs
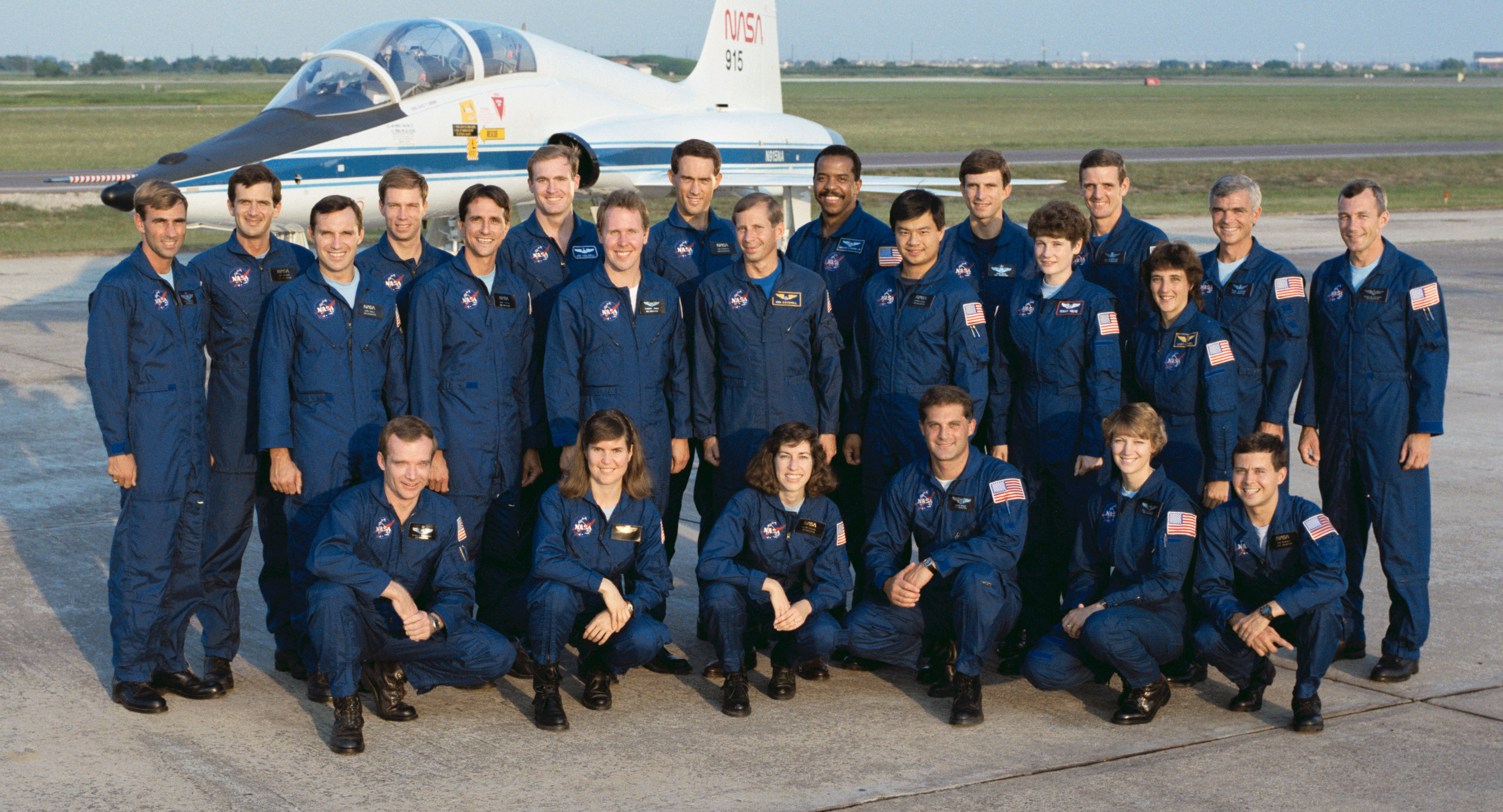
- The Astronauts of Group 13
- Year selected: 1990
- Number selected: 23

NASA Astronaut Group 13 (nicknamed "The Hairballs") was a group of 23 astronauts announced by NASA on 17 January 1990. The group name came from its selection of a black cat as a mascot, to play against the traditional unlucky connotations of the number 13.

== Pilots ==
- Kenneth Cockrell (born 1950), U.S. Navy (5 flights)

STS-56 Discovery (Science Mission; Flew as a Mission specialist)
STS-69 Endeavour (2nd flight of the Wake Shield Facility)
STS-80 Columbia (3rd flight of the Wake Shield Facility)
STS-98 Atlantis (ISS Assembly Mission - Launched the Destiny Laboratory Module)
STS-111 Endeavour (ISS Resupply Mission; Launched Expedition 5)

- Eileen Collins (born 1956), U.S. Air Force (4 flights)

STS-63 Discovery (Shuttle-Mir Mission; became the first female pilot of a U.S. Spacecraft)
STS-84 Atlantis (Shuttle-Mir Mission)
STS-93 Columbia (Deployed Chandra X-Ray Observatory; became the first female commander of a U.S. Spacecraft)
STS-114 Discovery (Return to Flight)

- William G. Gregory (born 1957), U.S. Air Force (1 flight)

STS-67 Endeavour (2nd flight of the ASTRO telescope)

- James D. Halsell (born 1956), U.S. Air Force (5 flights)

STS-65 Columbia (Science Mission)
STS-74 Atlantis (Shuttle-Mir Mission)
STS-83 Columbia (Intended to be a Science Mission; Mission cut short due to fuel cell problems)
STS-94 Columbia (Science Mission using experiments intended to be conducted on STS-83)
STS-101 Atlantis (ISS Supply Mission)

- Charles J. Precourt (born 1955), U.S. Air Force (4 flights)

STS-55 Columbia (German Spacelab Mission)
STS-71 Atlantis (Shuttle-Mir Mission)
STS-84 Atlantis (Shuttle-Mir Mission)
STS-91 Discovery (Shuttle-Mir Mission)

- Richard A. Searfoss (1956–2018), U.S. Air Force (3 flights)

STS-58 Columbia (Science Mission)
STS-76 Atlantis (Shuttle-Mir Mission)
STS-90 Columbia (Science Mission)

- Terrence W. Wilcutt (born 1949), U.S. Marine Corps (4 flights)

STS-68 Endeavour (Science Mission)
STS-79 Atlantis (Shuttle-Mir Mission)
STS-89 Endeavour (Shuttle-Mir Mission)
STS-106 Atlantis (ISS Supply Mission)

== Mission specialists ==
- Daniel W. Bursch (born 1957), U.S. Navy (4 flights)

STS-51 Discovery (Launched the ACTS satellite)
STS-68 Endeavour (Science Mission)
STS-77 Endeavour (Spartan-207)
STS-108 Endeavour (ISS Resupply Mission)
ISS Expedition 4 (6 month mission to the ISS)
STS-111 Endeavour (The mission landed Expedition 4)

- Leroy Chiao (born 1960), Engineer (4 flights)

STS-65 Columbia (Science Mission)
STS-72 Endeavour (Returned Japan's Space Flyer Unit)
STS-92 Discovery (ISS Assembly Mission - Launched the Z1 Truss Segment and PMA-3)
Soyuz TMA-5 (The launch and landing vehicle of Expedition 10)
ISS Expedition 10 (6 month mission to the ISS)

- Michael R. Clifford (1952–2021), U.S. Army (3 flights)

STS-53 Discovery (Classified DoD Mission)
STS-59 Endeavour (Science Mission)
STS-76 Atlantis (Shuttle-Mir Mission)

- Nancy J. Currie (born 1958), U.S. Army (4 flights)

STS-57 Endeavour (Science Mission)
STS-70 Discovery (Launched TDRS 7)
STS-88 Endeavour (ISS Assembly Mission - Launched Unity (Node 1), PMA-1, and PMA-2)
STS-109 Columbia (Hubble Space Telescope Servicing Mission; Columbia's last successful flight)

- Bernard A. Harris, Jr. (born 1956), Physician (2 flights)

STS-55 Columbia (German Spacelab Mission)
STS-63 Discovery (Shuttle-Mir Mission)

- Susan J. Helms (born 1958), U.S. Air Force (5 flights)

STS-54 Endeavour (Launched TDRS 6)
STS-64 Discovery (Science Mission)
STS-78 Columbia (Science Mission)
STS-101 Atlantis (ISS Supply Mission)
STS-102 Discovery (The mission launched Expedition 2)
ISS Expedition 2 (6 month mission to the ISS)
STS-105 Discovery (The mission landed Expedition 2)

- Thomas D. Jones (born 1955), U.S. Air Force (4 flights)

STS-59 Endeavour (Science Mission)
STS-68 Endeavour (Science Mission)
STS-80 Columbia (3rd flight of the Wake Shield Facility)
STS-98 Atlantis (ISS Assembly Mission - Launched the Destiny Laboratory Module)

- William S. McArthur (born 1951), U.S. Army (4 flights)

STS-58 Columbia (Science Mission)
STS-74 Atlantis (Shuttle-Mir Mission)
STS-92 Discovery (ISS Assembly Mission - Launched the Z1 Truss Segment and PMA-3)
Soyuz TMA-7 (The launch and landing vehicle of Expedition 12)
ISS Expedition 12 (6 month mission to the ISS; was the Expedition 12 CDR)

- James H. Newman (born 1956), Physicist (4 flights)

STS-51 Discovery (Launched the ACTS satellite)
STS-69 Endeavour (2nd flight of the Wake Shield Facility)
STS-88 Endeavour (ISS Assembly Mission - Launched Unity (Node 1), PMA-1, and PMA-2)
STS-109 Columbia (Hubble Space Telescope Servicing Mission; Columbia's last successful flight)

- Ellen Ochoa (born 1958), Engineer (4 flights)

STS-56 Discovery (Science Mission)
STS-66 Atlantis (Science Mission - ATLAS-03)
STS-96 Discovery (ISS Supply Mission)
STS-110 Atlantis (Launched the S0 Truss Segment)

- Ronald M. Sega (born 1952), U.S. Air Force (2 flights)

STS-60 Discovery (Shuttle-Mir Mission)
STS-76 Atlantis (Shuttle-Mir Mission)

- Donald A. Thomas (born 1955), Engineer (4 flights)

STS-65 Columbia (Science Mission)
STS-70 Discovery (Launched TDRS 7)
STS-83 Columbia (Intended to be a Science Mission; Mission cut short due to fuel cell problems)
STS-94 Columbia (Science Mission using experiments intended to be conducted on STS-83)

- Janice E. Voss (1956–2012), Engineer (5 flights)

STS-57 Endeavour (Science Mission)
STS-63 Discovery (Shuttle-Mir Mission)
STS-83 Columbia (Intended to be a Science Mission; Mission cut short due to fuel cell problems)
STS-94 Columbia (Science Mission using experiments intended to be conducted on STS-83)
STS-99 Endeavour (Shuttle Radar Topography Mission)

- Carl Walz (1955), Physicist (4 flights)

STS-51 Discovery (Satellite deployment Astronomy)
STS-65 Columbia (Micro-gravity research)
STS-79 Atlantis (Shuttle-Mir Mission)
STS-108/STS-111 (Both Endeavour) (Crew rotation to and from the International Space Station/ISS)
ISS Expedition 4 (6,5 month mission to the ISS)

- Peter Wisoff (1958), Physicist (4 flights)

STS-57 Endeavour (1st flight of Spacehab - Satellite retrieval)
STS-68 Endeavour (Space Radar Lab-2 (SRL-2) )
STS-81 Atlantis (Shuttle-Mir Mission)
STS-92 Discovery (delivered the Z1 truss and Pressurized Mating Adapter 3 to the International Space Station ISS)

- David Wolf (1956), Medical Doctor, Engineer, Inventor (4 flights)

STS-58 Columbia (Spacelab Life Sciences 2)
STS-86 Atlantis/STS-89 Endeavour (Shuttle-Mir Mission)
STS-112 Atlantis (delivered the S1 truss segment to the International Space Station ISS)
STS-127 Endeavour (install the final two components of the Japanese Experiment Module)

== See also ==
- List of astronauts by year of selection
