= Terrence W. Wilcutt =

American astronaut (born 1949)

Terrence Wilcutt
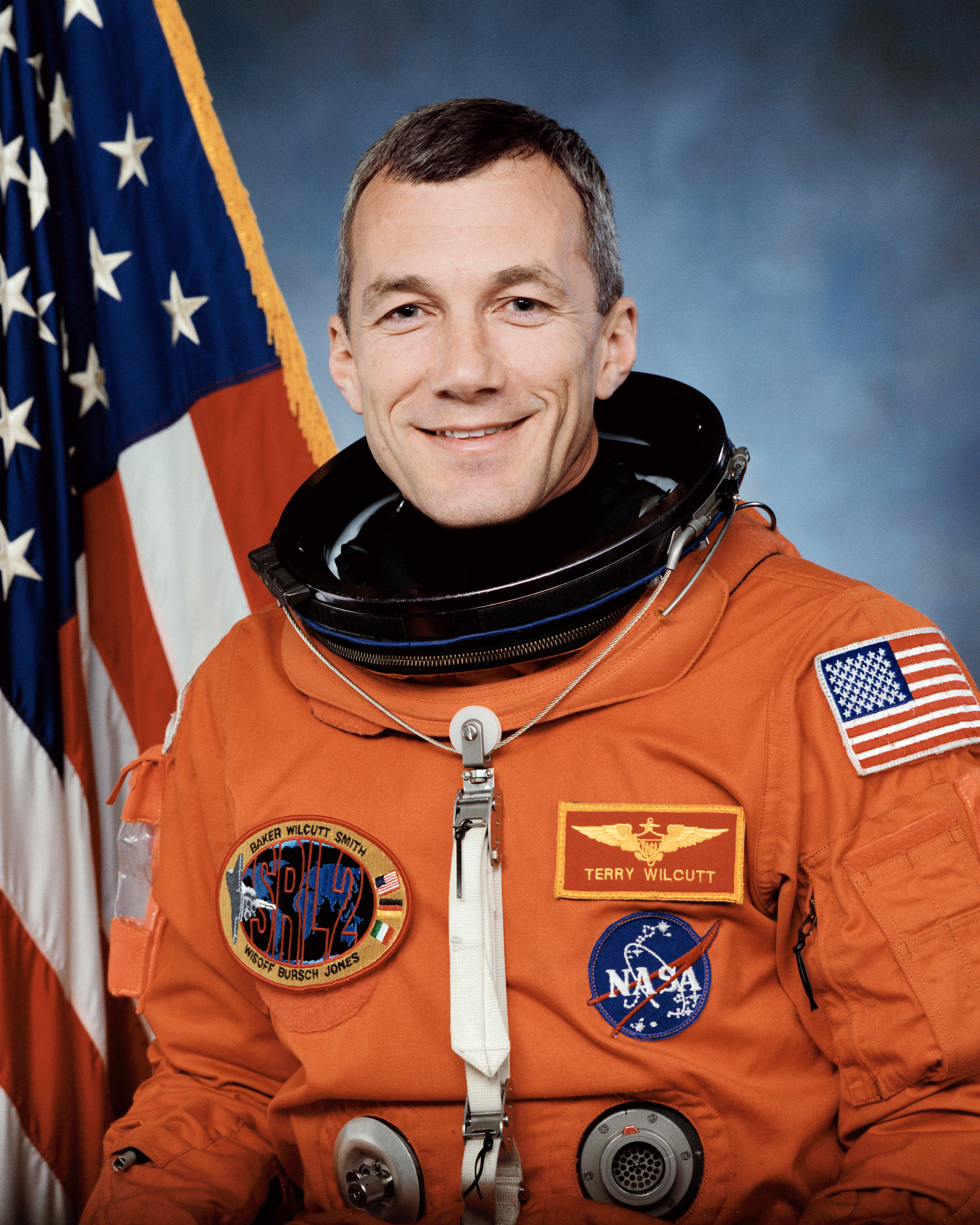
- Born: Terrence Wade Wilcutt; October 31, 1949 (age 76); Russellville, Kentucky, U.S.
- Education: Western Kentucky University (BA)
- Space career

NASA astronaut
- Rank: Colonel, USMC
- Time in space: 42d 0h 5m
- Selection: NASA Group 13 (1990)
- Missions: STS-68; STS-79; STS-89; STS-106
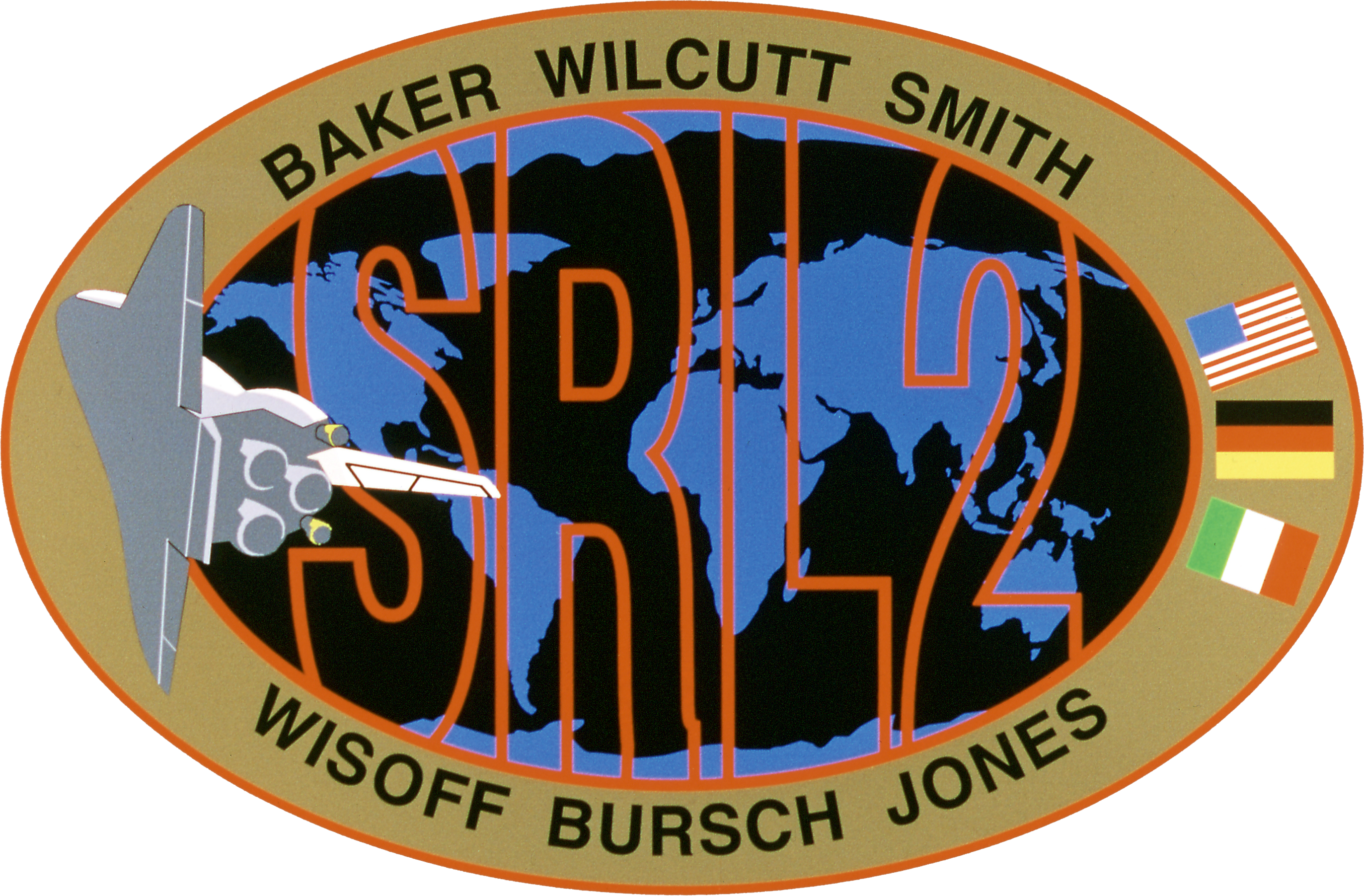
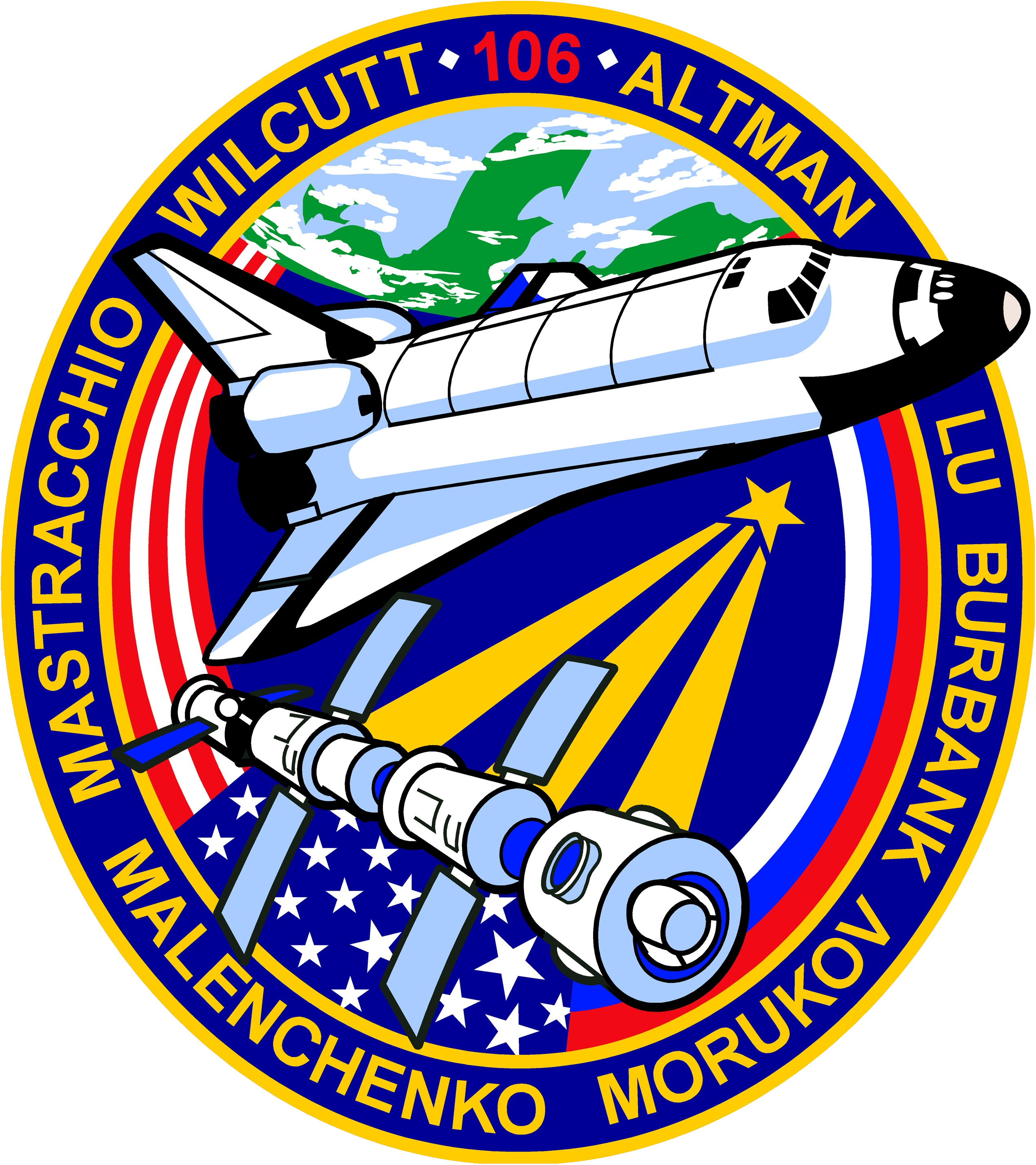
- Mission insignia

Terrence Wade Wilcutt (born October 31, 1949) is a United States Marine Corps officer and a former NASA astronaut. He is a veteran of four Space Shuttle missions. Wilcutt was NASA's Chief of Safety and Mission Assurance, until his retirement from NASA in December 2020.

== Personal ==
Born October 31, 1949, in Russellville, Kentucky, but raised in Louisville, Kentucky, Wilcutt graduated from Southern High School in 1967; and earned a Bachelor of Arts degree in mathematics in 1974 from Western Kentucky University where he was a member of the Lambda Chi Alpha fraternity. He then taught high school math for two years before entering the United States Marine Corps.

He was commissioned in 1976 and earned his aviator wings in 1978. Following initial F-4 Phantom training with squadron VMFAT-101, he reported to VMFA-235 at Marine Corps Air Station Kaneohe Bay, Hawaii. While assigned to VMFA-235, Wilcutt attended the U.S. Navy Fighter Weapons School ("TOPGUN"), and made two overseas deployments to Japan, Korea, and the Philippines. In 1983 he was selected for F/A-18 conversion training, and served as an F/A-18 Fighter Weapons and Air Combat Maneuvering Instructor with VFA-125, Naval Air Station Lemoore, California. In 1986, Wilcutt was selected to attend the U.S. Naval Test Pilot School. Following graduation, he was assigned as a test pilot/project officer for Strike Aircraft Test Directorate (SATD) at the Naval Air Test Center, NAS Patuxent River, Maryland. While assigned to SATD, Wilcutt flew the F/A-18 Hornet, the A-7 Corsair II, the F-4 Phantom, and various other aircraft while serving in a wide variety of projects and classified programs.

He has over 6,600 flight hours in more than 30 different aircraft.

== NASA career ==
Wilcutt was selected as an astronaut candidate in 1990; he piloted missions STS-68 (1994) and STS-79 (1996). Wilcutt commanded mission STS-89 (1998) to the Mir space station and STS-106 (2000) to the International Space Station.

Wilcutt served as director of safety and mission assurance at NASA's Johnson Space Center in Houston where he was tasked with the Safety Technical Authority of the programs and projects at JSC as well as JSC's Institutional Safety program. Since Sept 1, 2011, Wilcutt has served as NASA's chief of safety and mission assurance. He was responsible for the development, implementation and oversight of all safety and mission assurance policies and procedures for all NASA programs. He retired from NASA on December 31, 2020.

== Spaceflight experience ==
STS-68 Endeavour (September 30 to October 11, 1994) was part of NASA's Mission to Planet Earth. STS-68, Space Radar Lab-2 (SRL-2), was the second flight of three advanced radars called SIR-C/X-SAR (Spaceborne Imaging Radar-C/X-Band Synthetic Aperture Radar), and a carbon-monoxide pollution sensor, MAPS (Measurement of Air Pollution from Satellites). SIR-C/X-SAR and MAPS operated together in Endeavour's cargo bay to study Earth's surface and atmosphere, creating radar images of Earth's surface environment and mapping global production and transport of carbon monoxide pollution. Real-time crew observations of environmental conditions, along with over 14,000 photographs, aided the science team in interpreting the SRL data. The SRL-2 mission was a highly successful test of technology intended for long-term environmental and geological monitoring of planet Earth. STS-68 launched from Kennedy Space Center, Florida, and landed at Edwards Air Force Base, California. Mission duration was 11 days, 5 hours, 46 minutes, traveling 4.7 million miles in 183 orbits of the Earth.

STS-79 Atlantis (September 16–26, 1996), the fourth in the joint American-Russian Shuttle-Mir series of missions, launched from and returned to land at Kennedy Space Center, Florida. STS-79 rendezvoused with the Russian Mir space station and ferried supplies, personnel, and scientific equipment to this base 240 miles above the Earth. The crew transferred over 3.5 tons of supplies to and from the Mir and exchanged U.S. astronauts on Mir for the first time – leaving John Blaha and bringing Shannon Lucid home after her record six months stay aboard Mir. Mission duration was 10 days, 3 hours, 18 minutes, traveling 3.9 million miles in 159 orbits of the Earth.

STS-89 Endeavour (January 22–31, 1998), was the eighth Shuttle-Mir docking mission during which the crew transferred more than 9,000 pounds of scientific equipment, logistical hardware and water from Space Shuttle Endeavour to Mir. In the fifth and last exchange of a U.S. astronaut, STS-89 delivered Andy Thomas to Mir and returned with David Wolf. Mission duration was 8 days, 19 hours and 47 seconds, traveling 3.6 million miles in 138 orbits of the Earth.

STS-106 Atlantis (September 8–20, 2000) was a 12-day mission during which the crew successfully prepared the International Space Station for the arrival of the first permanent crew. The five astronauts and two cosmonauts delivered more than 6,600 pounds of supplies and installed batteries, power converters, life support, and exercise equipment on the Space Station. Two crew members performed a space walk in order to connect power, data and communications cables to the newly arrived Zvezda Service Module and the Space Station. STS-106 orbited the Earth 185 times, and covered 4.9 million miles in 11 days, 19 hours, and 10 minutes.

== Special honors ==
- Defense Superior Service Medal (1995)
- Distinguished Flying Cross (1998)
- Defense Meritorious Service Medal (1997)
- Navy Commendation Medal (1990)
- Sea Service Deployment Ribbon
- NASA Distinguished Service Medal (2001)
- NASA Outstanding Leadership Medal (2000)
- NASA Exceptional Service Medal (1998)
- NASA Space Flight Medals (4), (1994, 1996, 1998, 2000)
- American Astronautical Society Flight Achievement Award (1997)
- V.M. Komarov Diploma, Federation Aeronautique Internationale (FAI) space award for outstanding achievements in the field of exploration of outer space.
- Distinguished Alumnus, Western Kentucky University
- Honorary Ph.D. of Science, Western Kentucky University (2000).
