= List of Space Shuttle rollbacks =

This is a list of Space Shuttle rollbacks. "Rollback" is the term NASA uses when the Space Shuttle was rolled back from the launch pad atop the mobile launcher platform and Crawler-transporter to the Vehicle Assembly Building (VAB). A variety of factors could require a rollback, from severe weather to the need for repairs that could not be performed at the launch pad. Shuttle rollbacks are listed in chronological order:

No.	Date	Orbiter	Mission	Reason	Description
1	1983-10-19	Columbia	STS-9	Inspection failure	Suspect exhaust nozzle on right solid rocket booster. Columbia was de-stacked and moved back to the Orbiter Processing Facility (OPF).
2	1984-07-11	Discovery	STS-41-D	Abort	Space shuttle main engine (SSME) #3 replaced after a launch abort.
3	1985-03-05	Challenger	STS-51-E STS-51-B	Payload	Challenger was rolled back from Pad 39A due to a timing problem with the primary payload, the Tracking and Data Relay Satellite-B (TDRS-B). The vehicle was de-stacked in the VAB and the orbiter returned to Orbiter Processing Facility. The mission, STS-51E, was canceled and the orbiter was re-manifested with 51-B payloads.
4	1990-06-12	Columbia	STS-35	Inspection failure	A hydrogen leak was detected in External tank (ET) umbilical.
5	1990-08-09	Atlantis	STS-38	Fuel leak	Atlantis was rolled back after tests confirmed a hydrogen fuel leak on the external tank side of the external tank/orbiter quick-disconnect umbilical.
6	1990-10-09	Columbia	STS-35	Weather	Weather threat from Tropical Storm Klaus.
7	1991-03-07	Discovery	STS-39	Inspection failure	Discovery was rolled back to the VAB after significant cracks were found on all four lug hinges on the two external tank umbilical door drive mechanisms.
8	1994-08-24	Endeavour	STS-68	Abort	Pad abort due to a high discharge temperature in a pump on main engine number three. All three engines were replaced in the VAB.
9	1995-06-08	Discovery	STS-70	Inspection failure	Yellow flicker woodpeckers drilled approximately 71 holes on the external tank foam insulation, many of which were too high up on the tank to be accessed at the pad for repairs.
10	1995-08-01	Endeavour	STS-69	Weather	Endeavour was moved back to the VAB due to threat of severe weather from Hurricane Erin.
11	1996-07-10	Atlantis	STS-79	Weather	Atlantis was moved back to the VAB due to threat of severe weather from Hurricane Bertha.
12	1996-09-04	Atlantis	STS-79	Weather	Atlantis was moved back to the VAB due to threat of severe weather from Hurricane Fran.
13	1999-05-16	Discovery	STS-96	Inspection failure	Discovery was moved back to the VAB to repair hail damage to the external tank foam insulation.
14	2001-01-02	Atlantis	STS-98	Crawler failure	Atlantis began rollout to Launch Pad 39A, but an hour later stopped on the crawler path so engineers could troubleshoot a failed computer processor on the crawler transporter. Troubleshooting efforts were unsuccessful, the shuttle was returned to the VAB using a secondary computer processor.
15	2001-01-19	Atlantis	STS-98	Inspection failure	Atlantis was returned to the VAB due to uncertainty involving the integrity of the SRB cables.
16	2005-05-26	Discovery	STS-114	Component upgrade	Discovery was returned to the VAB in order to get a new, modified external fuel tank in preparation for the first Return to Flight mission following the Columbia accident.
17	2006-08-29	Atlantis	STS-115	Weather	Atlantis was moved back towards the VAB due to threat of severe weather from Tropical Storm Ernesto. However halfway through rollback, they elected to return Atlantis to the Pad due to improvement in the weather forecast.
18	2007-03-04	Atlantis	STS-117	Inspection failure	Atlantis was moved back to the VAB after a hail storm damaged the foam insulation on the orbiter's external tank, necessitating repairs. Atlantis was then successfully launched on June 8, 2007.
19	2008-10-20	Atlantis	STS-125	Payload	Atlantis was moved back to the VAB to allow time to troubleshoot a problem with the Hubble Space Telescope on orbit. Hardware to correct the problem was added to the STS-125 mission payload. Atlantis was then successfully launched on May 11, 2009.
20	2010-12-17	Discovery	STS-133	External tank repairs	Discovery rolled off the launch pad after insulating foam and two structural stringers on the external tank cracked during a launch attempt on November 5, 2010. The repair effort lasted two months as engineers beefed up the structural integrity of the structural members in question and replaced the foam that was removed to facilitate those repairs. The mission lifted off on February 24, 2011. The external tank performed flawlessly during fueling and launch.
