= Blažej =

Blažej is a Czech and Slovak name. Błażej is a Polish name. It is a masculine given name derived from Latin Blasius (known in English as Blaise), but it also appears as a surname (Czech and Slovak feminine: Blažejová). Notable people with the surname include:

== Given name ==
=== Blažej ===
- Blažej Baláž (born 1958), Slovak artist
- Blažej Vaščák (born 1983), Slovak footballer
- Jan Blažej Santini-Aichel (1677–1723), Czech-Italian architect
- Karel Blažej Kopřiva (1756–1785), Czech organist and composer

=== Błażej ===
- Błażej Augustyn (born 1988), Polish footballer
- Błażej Janiaczyk (born 1983), Polish racing cyclist
- Błażej Koniusz (born 1988), Polish tennis player
- Bernard of Wąbrzeźno, born Błażej Pęcharek (1575–1603), Catholic priest and a Benedictine monk
- Błażej Radler (born 1982), Polish footballer
- Błażej Telichowski (born 1984), Polish footballer

== Surname ==
- Drahomír Blažej (born 1962), Czech politician
- Franciszek Błażej (1907–1951), Polish military commander

== Fictional characters ==
- Arnošt Blažej, main character in Hospital at the End of the City

== See also ==
- Blažek
- Blaha
