= Blažek =

Blažek (Czech pronunciation: [ˈblaʒɛk]; feminine: Blažková) is a Czech surname which originates from the Czech given name Blažej (in English known as Blaise). Notable people with the surname include:

== Sports ==
- Barbora Blažková (born 1997), Czech ski jumper
- Filip Blažek (born 1998), Slovak footballer
- Jakub Blažek (born 1989), Czech footballer
- Jan Blažek (born 1988), Czech footballer
- Jaromír Blažek (born 1972), Czech footballer
- Jindřich Blažek (1933–1997), Czech rower
- Lubor Blažek (born 1954), Czech basketball coach
- Michal Blažek (1955–2025), Czech sculptor
- Michael Blazek (born 1989), American baseball player
- Milada Blažková (born 1958), Czech field hockey player
- Miloslav Blažek (1922–1985), Czech ice hockey player
- Pavol Blažek (born 1958), Slovak athlete
- Petr Blažek (born 1961), Czech modern pentathlete
- Petra Blazek (born 1987), Austrian handballer

== Other ==
- Allan Blazek (1950–2021), American record producer
- Douglas Blazek (born 1941), Polish-American poet
- František Blažek (1863–1944), Czech architect
- Jaroslav Blažek (1896–1976), Czech cinematographer
- Jaroslava Blažková (1933–2017), Slovak writer
- Matthias Blazek (born 1966), German historian and journalist
- Pavel Blažek (born 1969), Czech politician
- Václav Blažek (born 1959), Czech linguist

== See also ==
- Błażek, a village in Poland
