= František Bláha =

Czechoslovak legioneer and general

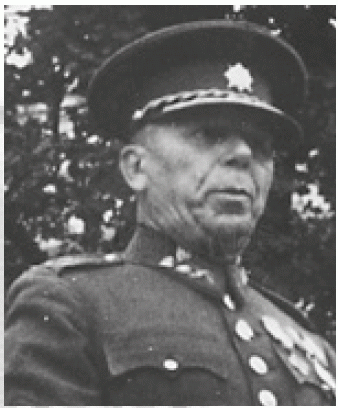

František Bláha (26 February 1886 – 21 May 1945) was a Czech soldier, general of the Czechoslovak Army and one of the senior commanders of the Defense of the Nation.

== Early life and education ==
Bláha was born on 26 February 1886 in Poděbrady. His father, František Bláha, was a butcher; his mother was named Anna, née Effenbergrová.

He graduated from lower grammar school in Hradec Králové. In 1907–1908 he performed military service at the Landgran Regiment in Prague. On 23 November 1914, after the outbreak of World War I, he was sent to the Russian front, only to be captured after six days. He joined the Czechoslovak legions on 6 January 1916, in Tyumen.

After graduating from the officer school in Kyiv and given the rank of lieutenant, he worked on the recruitment committee of the 6th MS. Rifle Regiment. After completing a course in Iași in 1917–1918, again, he took part in battles at Marianivka and Yekaterinburg. He returned to the newly established nation of Czechoslovakia on 1 June 1921.

== Military career ==
After spending a year on the general staff, he was transferred to the 45th Infantry Regiment in Khust in Carpathian Ruthenia. In March 1923 he took command of the 1st Battalion of the regiment, and shortly afterwards became the regiment's deputy commander; in December he became commander of the regiment. After completing a series of courses in November 1932 he was appointed commander of the 21st Infantry Brigade in Košice. After a year he was appointed commander of the Command School in Prague.

Between 1935 and 1938 he commanded the 7th Infantry Brigade in Josefov, and on 1 January 1938, he became Deputy Commander of the 4th Infantry Division, a post he held during the mobilization from 21 June to 15 October 1938.

=== German occupation ===
After the occupation of Czechoslovakia by the Nazi Germany, he volunteered into the ranks of the Defense of the nation and took command of the resistance movement in June 1944 when its first commander, Zdeněk Novák, was arrested. In collaboration with the Barium landing team, he built a mobilization network in Eastern Bohemia, counting on the creation of four divisions and their deployment after approaching the front.

On 17 November 1944 he was arrested by the Gestapo and imprisoned in the small fortress in Terezín. He lived to see the liberation of Czechoslovakia, but died in Terezín in a typhus epidemic on 21 May 1945. He was posthumously promoted to the rank of divisional general in 1946.

== Monument ==
On 22 April 2015, a memorial plaque was unveiled at the site of František Bláha's birthplace.

== Honors ==
- 1919 Order of the Falcon with swords
- 1919 Order of St. Stanislava II. degree with swords
- 1921 Czechoslovak War Cross 1914–1918
- 1921 Czechoslovak Revolutionary Medal
- 1921 Czechoslovak Victory Medal
- 1930 Romanian Order of the Star
- 1946 Czechoslovak War Cross 1939 (posthumous)
