= STS-68 =

1994 American crewed spaceflight

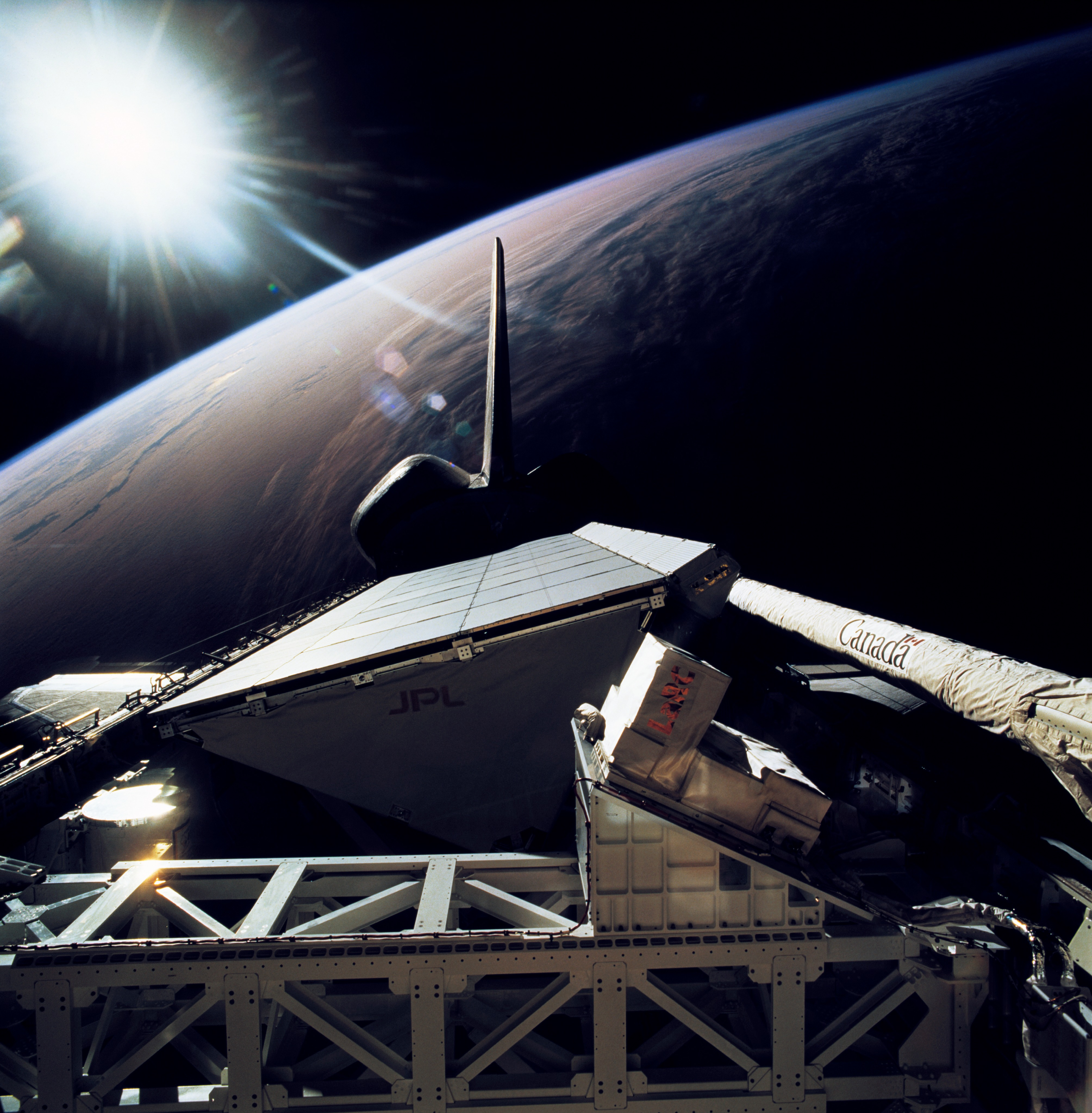
- SIR-C in Endeavour's payload bay
- Names: Space Transportation System-68
- Mission type: Radar imaging
- Operator: NASA
- COSPAR ID: 1994-062A
- SATCAT no.: 23285
- Mission duration: 11 days, 05 hours, 46 minutes, 08 seconds
- Distance travelled: 7,569,092 kilometres (4,703,216 mi)
- Orbits completed: 182

Spacecraft properties
- Spacecraft: Space Shuttle Endeavour

Crew
- Crew size: 6
- Members: Michael A. Baker; Terrence W. Wilcutt; Steven L. Smith; Daniel W. Bursch; Peter J. K. Wisoff; Thomas Jones

Start of mission
- Launch date: September 30, 1994, 11:16:01 UTC
- Launch site: Kennedy, LC-39A

End of mission
- Landing date: October 11, 1994, 17:02:09 UTC
- Landing site: Edwards, Runway 22

Orbital parameters
- Reference system: Geocentric
- Regime: Low Earth
- Perigee altitude: 212 kilometres (132 mi)
- Apogee altitude: 224 kilometres (139 mi)
- Inclination: 57.0 degrees
- Period: 88.85 minutes
- Epoch: October 2, 1994
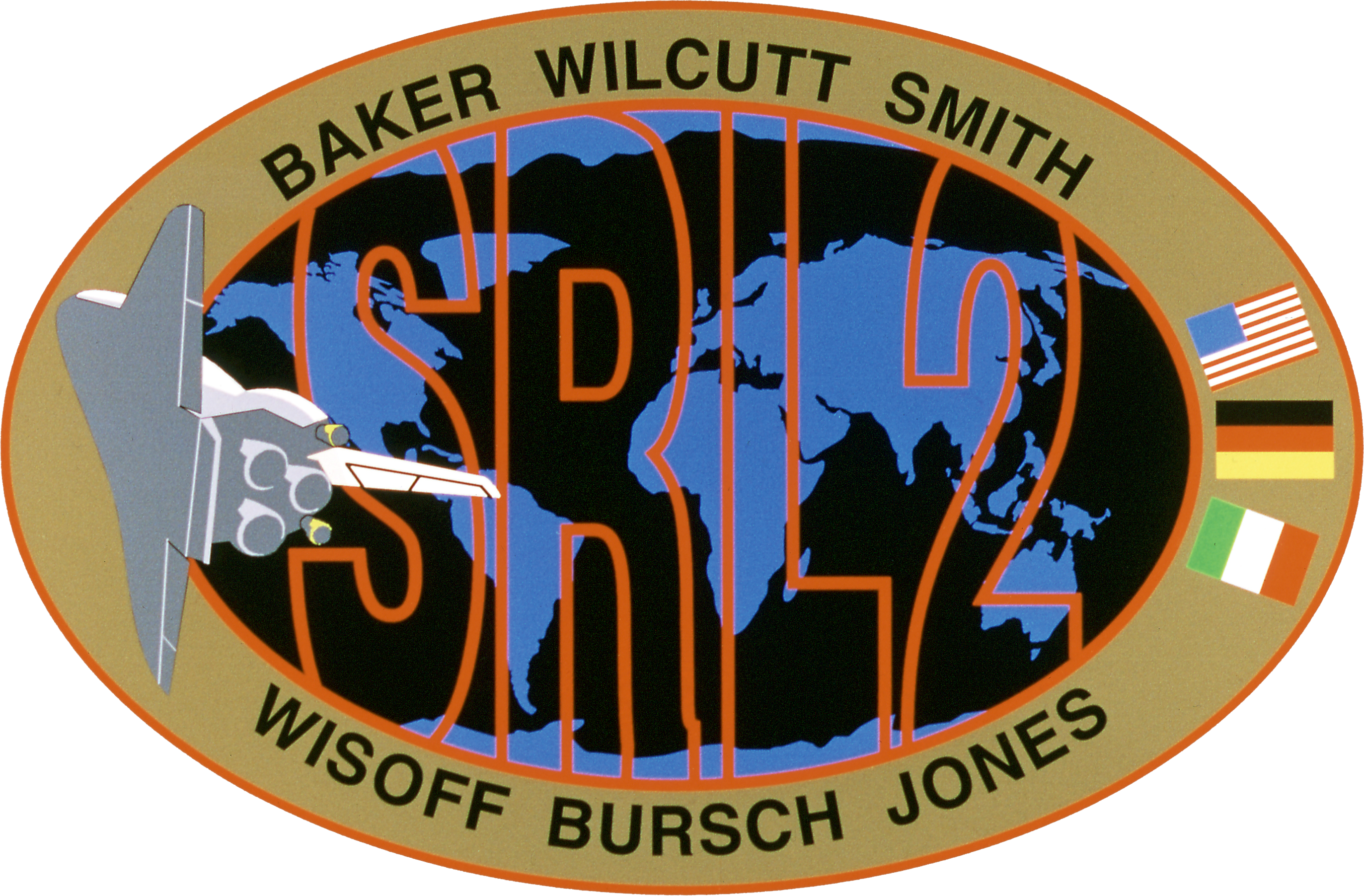
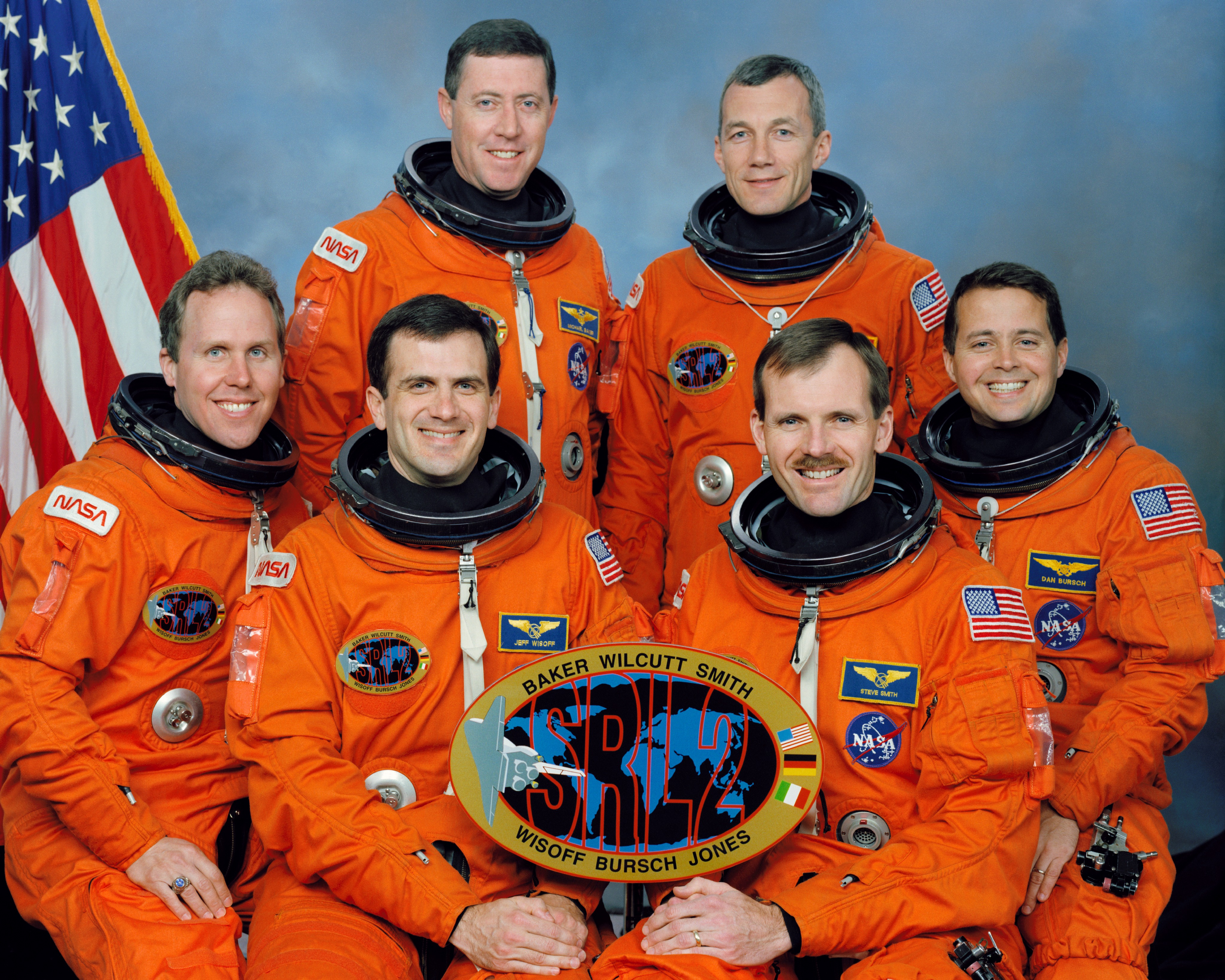
- STS-68 mission patch Left to right – Back row: Baker, Wilcutt; Front row: Jones, Wisoff, Smith, Bursch Space Shuttle program

STS-68 was a human spaceflight mission using Space Shuttle Endeavour that launched from Kennedy Space Center, Florida on September 30, 1994.

== Crew ==
Position	Astronaut
Commander	Michael A. Baker; Third spaceflight
Pilot	Terrence W. Wilcutt; First spaceflight
Mission Specialist 1	Steven L. Smith; First spaceflight
Mission Specialist 2 Flight Engineer	Daniel W. Bursch; Second spaceflight
Mission Specialist 3	Peter J. K. Wisoff; Second spaceflight
Mission Specialist 4	Thomas D. Jones; Second spaceflight

== Launch ==
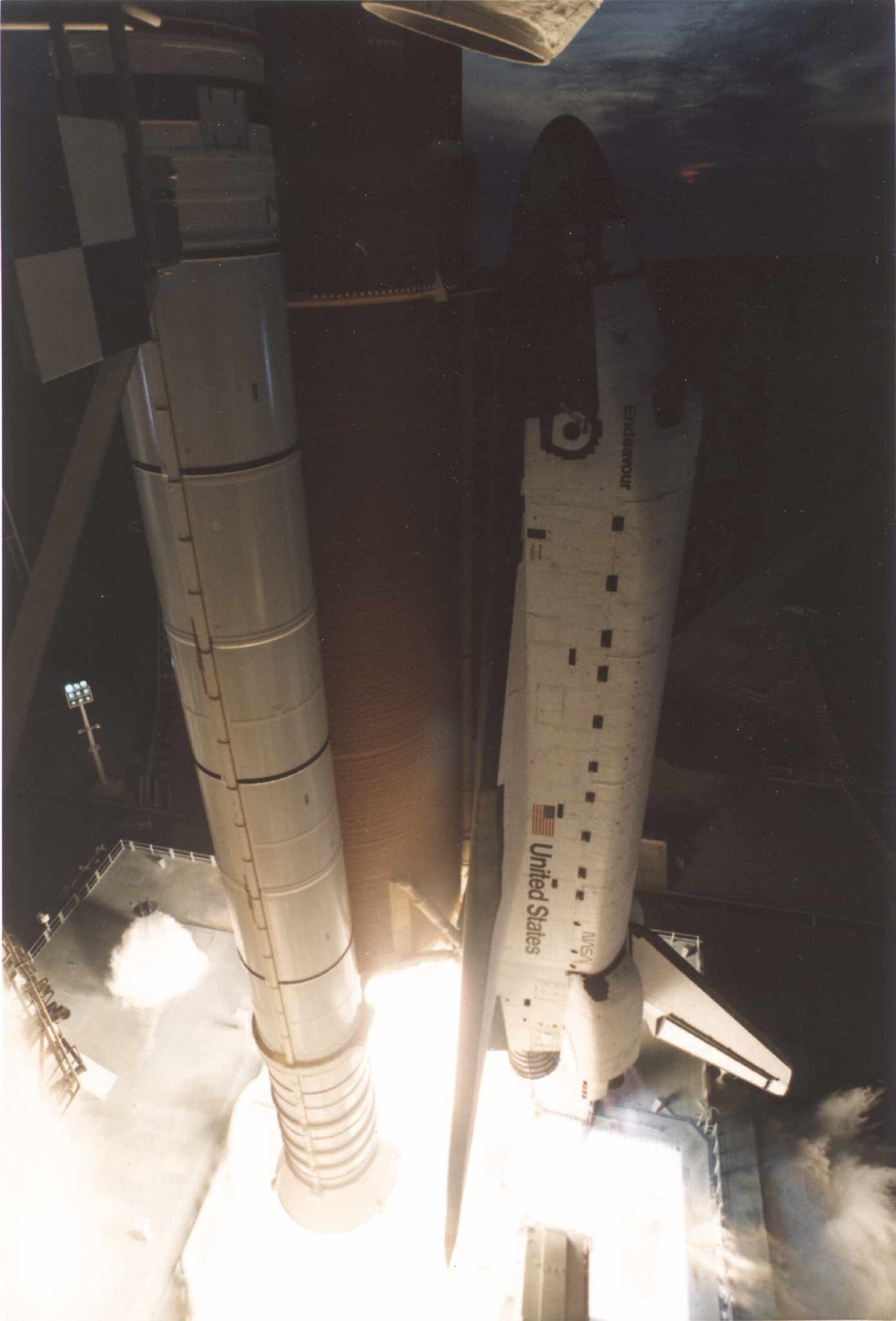
STS-68 Launch

Attempt	Planned	Result	Turnaround	Reason	Decision point	Weather go (%)	Notes
1	18 Aug 1994, 6:54:00 am	Scrubbed	—	Technical	18 Aug 1994, 6:53 am (T−00:00:01)		High pressure in a liquid oxygen turbopump caused all three engines to shut down. Endeavour was rolled back to VAB for engine replacement and STS-64 was moved ahead of STS-68.
2	30 Sep 1994, 7:16:01 am	Success	43 days 0 hours 22 minutes				

The launch was originally scheduled August 18, 1994, but there was an RSLS abort at T−1.9 s, after all three main engines ignited – the fifth (and final) time in the shuttle program where an RSLS abort occurred after main engine ignition. Previous aborts occurred on STS-41-D, STS-51-F, STS-55 and STS-51. The automatic abort was initiated by the onboard General Purpose Computers (GPC) when the discharge temperature on MPS Main Engine #3 High Pressure Oxidizer Turbopump (HPOT) exceeded its redline value. The HPOT typically operates at 28,120 rpm and boosts the liquid oxygen pressure from 422 to 4,300 psi (2.91 to 29.6 MPa). There are 2 sensor channels measuring temperature on the HPOT. The B channel indicated a redline condition while the other was near redline conditions. The redline limit to initiate a shutdown is at 867 K. This limit increases to 980 K at T−1.3 s (5.3 s after Main Engine Start). Main Engine #3 (SN 2032) has been used on two previous flights with 2,412 seconds (40 min) of hot-fire time and a total of eight starts. This was the first flight for the HPOT on Main Engine (SSME) #3. Mission specialist Dan Bursch became the only astronaut to experience two RSLS aborts, having previously experienced one on STS-51.

A new launch date was set for early October and then moved up to late September. The procedure that has been used on previous aborts treats an RSLS abort after SSME ignition as a launch and to require a complete engine reinspection. A rollback of Endeavour to the VAB was done on August 24, 1994. Afterwards, Endeavour's SSMEs were removed and inspected. Three flight certified SSMEs (removed from the Atlantis STS-66 mission) were installed on the orbiter and Endeavour was rolled back to the launch pad on September 13, 1994. SSME #3 was shipped to the Stennis Space Center in Mississippi for test stand firing over the Labor day weekend (September 5, 1994). The engine was later flown on STS-70 in 1995.

Lift-off occurred on September 30, 1994, at 7:16:00.068 am EDT from Kennedy Space Center Launch Pad 39-A, at the start of a 2-hour-30-minute launch window. Orbiter mass at liftoff was 247,129 pounds (112,096 kg) including payload. Total vehicle liftoff mass was 2,045,879 kilograms (4,510,391 lb); payload liftoff mass was 12,511 kilograms (27,582 lb). At Main Engine Cutoff (MECO) at MET+8:35, Endeavour was in an orbit with an apogee of 115 nautical miles (213 km; 132 mi) and a perigee of 28 nmi (52 km; 32 mi), traveling at 25,779 ft/s (7,857 m/s). No OMS-1 burn was required. OMS-2 burn was 1 min 42 s (164 ft/s or 50 m/s) at MET+33 min.

Transatlantic Abort Landing (TAL) sites for the initial launch attempt were Zaragoza, Spain, Moron, Spain and Ben Guerir, Morocco. Abort Once Around landing site was White Sands Space Harbor, New Mexico, USA.

== Landing ==
Landing took place at Runway 22 at Edwards Air Force Base on October 11, 1994. Endeavour was originally scheduled to land at the KSC at 11:36 am EDT; however, KSC landing attempts on that date were waved off due to cloud cover over the Shuttle Landing Facility.

Endeavour performed an OMS deorbit burn at 12:09 pm EDT about 4,600 miles (7,400 km) from the landing strip at Edwards Air Force Base. The burn lasted 2 minutes 17 seconds, which lowered Endeavour's velocity by 232 ft/s (71 m/s). Astronaut John Casper flew the shuttle training aircraft at Edwards and said the weather was clear with light winds. Approach was from the southwest of the landing site with a right overhead turn of 280 degrees. Nose wheel touched down at 1:02:21 pm EDT, with wheel stop at 1:03:08 pm EDT. Rollout was approximately 8,495 feet (2,589 m) down the runway. Landing speed at main gear touchdown was approximately 265 mph (426 km/h). Orbiter landing mass was 100,709 kilograms (222,025 lb). Payload landing mass was 12,511 kilograms (27,582 lb).

=== Crew seat assignments ===
Seat	Launch	Landing	Seats 1–4 are on the flight deck. Seats 5–7 are on the mid-deck.
1	Baker		Seats 1–4 are on the flight deck. Seats 5–7 are on the mid-deck.
2	Wilcutt		Seats 1–4 are on the flight deck. Seats 5–7 are on the mid-deck.
3	Smith	Wisoff	Seats 1–4 are on the flight deck. Seats 5–7 are on the mid-deck.
4	Bursch		Seats 1–4 are on the flight deck. Seats 5–7 are on the mid-deck.
5	Wisoff	Smith	Seats 1–4 are on the flight deck. Seats 5–7 are on the mid-deck.
6	Jones		Seats 1–4 are on the flight deck. Seats 5–7 are on the mid-deck.
7	Unused		Seats 1–4 are on the flight deck. Seats 5–7 are on the mid-deck.

== Mission highlights ==
=== September 30, 1994 (Flight Day 1) ===
On Friday, September 30, 1994, at 9 am CST, STS-68 MCC Status Report #1 reported:

The Flight Control team in Houston gave the "Go for Orbit Operations" just before 8 am. The crew then began setting up the experiment and systems hardware aboard Endeavour. The primary payload on this flight is the Space Radar Laboratory (SRL-2), making its second flight to study the Earth's environment. Experiment operations will be conducted around the clock on this flight, with the astronauts divided into two teams. Commander Michael A. Baker, pilot Terrence W. Wilcutt and mission specialist Peter J. K. Wisoff are the "red team". Mission specialists Daniel W. Bursch, Thomas D. Jones and Steven L. Smith are the "blue team".

— NASA, STS-68 Mission Control Center Status Report #1, September 30, 1994

On Friday, September 30, 1994, at 5 pm CDT, STS-68 MCC Status Report #2 reported:

Shortly after 4 pm that day, flight controllers reported that the on-orbit checkout of the Spaceborne Imaging Radar-C (SIR-C) and the Synthetic Aperture Radar (X-SAR) had been completed, and that the primary SRL-2 instruments were ready for operation. Throughout the checkout, data takes were recorded over a number of sites, including Raco, Michigan; Bermuda; Bebedouro, Brazil; the Northeast Pacific Ocean and the Juan de Fuca Strait, between the United States and Canada. In addition to the prime payload, Wilcutt also activated the Commercial Protein Crystal Growth Experiment, the Cosmic Radiation Effects and Activation Monitor, and checked on the mouse-ear cress seedlings growing in the CHROMEX-05 experiment. The crew successfully engineered an in-flight maintenance procedure to get additional cooling air to the CPCG apparatus after higher than desired temperatures were noted by crystal growth sensors.

— NASA, STS-68 Mission Control Center Status Report #2, September 30, 1994

=== October 1, 1994 (Flight Day 2) ===
On Saturday, October 1, 1994, at 9 am CDT, STS-68 MCC Status Report #3 reported:

Environmental studies continued throughout Saturday morning aboard Endeavour as six astronauts working around the clock in two shifts assisted the Space Radar Laboratory science team on the ground with real-time observations from space.

While Commander Mike Baker and Pilot Terry Wilcutt made attitude adjustments of the orbiter to assist in precisely pointing the radar systems, Mission Specialist Jeff Wisoff provided running commentary and tape recording assistance for the many ground sites as Endeavour passed overhead at an altitude of 119 nautical miles (220 km). The STS-68 mission's three other crew members—Steve Smith, Dan Bursch and Tom Jones—perform the same duties on the opposite shift, beginning at about 4:30 this afternoon.

Late Friday night, Tom Jones sent down some video of a volcano erupting in Kamchatka. The experiment scientists reported the volcano began erupting a couple of weeks ago, but the latest "burst" from the Kliuchevskoi (pronounced clue-chev-skoy) volcano occurred about eight hours after Endeavour's 6:16 am launch Friday.

The SRL team is planning a series of data takes using the radar equipment as Endeavour moves over that area of the world. Those images will be compared with similar radar images gathered during the STS-59 mission in April, prior to the volcanic activity. Other radar data gathering of the Earth's surface today included the desert regions of Africa, both the Pacific and Atlantic Oceans and mountainous regions of the East and West coasts of the United States.

Early Saturday, Mike Baker sent down a short video tape of smudges and streaks he noticed shortly after launch on several of the forward flight deck windows. None of the streaks would hamper visual observations during entry and landing slated for Monday, October 10.

— NASA, STS-68 Mission Control Center Status Report #3, October 1, 1994

=== October 2, 1994 (Flight Day 3) ===
On Sunday, October 2, 1994, at 9 am CDT, STS-68 MCC Status Report #4 reported:

Radar data gathering today included forest areas of North Carolina, ocean current patterns in the Atlantic and Pacific Oceans, desert areas in Africa, and mountainous regions of the East and West coasts of the United States.

— NASA, STS-68 Mission Control Center Status Report #4, October 2, 1994

=== October 3, 1994 (Flight Day 4) ===
On Monday, October 3, 1994, at 10 am CDT, STS-68 MCC Status Report #5 reported:

Endeavour's Space Radar Laboratory equipment continued to search the Earth's land masses and oceans for environmental changes that have occurred since the last SRL mission in April.

The Red Team of Mike Baker, Terry Wilcutt and Jeff Wisoff will be on duty throughout much of the day while the Blue Team of Steve Smith, Dan Bursch and Tom Jones sleeps. Radar data gathering today included much of the East Coast of the United States, current patterns in the Atlantic and Pacific Oceans as well as other bodies of water, desert areas in Africa, and mountainous regions around the world.

Mission Specialist Jeff Wisoff pinpointed storms, lightning and fires and relayed the information to the SRL science team. His observations help correlate and corroborate data collected from the science instruments, including the measurement of air pollution by satellite, which measures carbon monoxide levels in the atmosphere.

Taking such measurements on this flight helps understand changes in the distribution of carbon monoxide as well as other seasonal changes in the environment that have occurred since Endeavour's last mission in April.

— NASA, STS-68 Mission Control Center Status Report #5, October 3, 1994

On Monday, October 3, 1994, at 5 pm CDT, STS-68 MCC Status Report #6 reported:

Endeavour's payload bay cameras sent to Earth dramatic video of the western coast of Oregon and the length of California and the Baja Peninsula that scientists will compare with radar images downlinked from Space Radar Laboratory-2 instruments earlier in the flight. The observations were part of a continuing effort to watch the Earth below for evidence of environmental changes that have occurred since the last SRL mission in April. The overall goal of the mission to better understand the differences in changes caused by natural processes and compare them to changes brought about by human activity. Radar data was recorded today over much of the East Coast of the United States, the Atlantic and Pacific Oceans, Manitoba, Canada, and French Guiana.

Special readings were taken with the Measurement of Air Pollution by Satellite instrument as intentionally set fires were monitored by scientists from the University of Iowa and the Canadian Forest Service. The wind field and thermal evolution of the fires will be analyzed to provide a better interpretation of carbon monoxide emissions from the burning forest and to help calibrate color infrared photography taken by the STS-68 crew. These fires were planned in advance of the mission, and would have been set for forest management purposes even if the shuttle mission were not in progress.

Astronauts relayed information about storms, lightning, fires and clear cutting to the SRL science team that will be used to help understand the radar images and MAPS data on carbon monoxide levels in the atmosphere.

— NASA, STS-68 Mission Control Center Status Report #6, October 3, 1994

=== October 4, 1994 (Flight Day 5) ===
On Tuesday, October 4, 1994, at 9 am CDT, STS-68 MCC Status Report #7 reported:

STS-68 crew members this morning performed two slight maneuvers to fine-tune Endeavour's orbit to mirror its track on the first Space Radar Laboratory mission to support a new experiment called interferometry. The trim burns adjust the orbit to within 10 metres (33 ft) of where it was in April which will allow scientists to make near identical measurements with the radar equipment to develop a three-dimensional comparison of environmental changes during the six months separating the two missions—STS-59 and STS-68.

— NASA, STS-68 Mission Control Center Status Report #7, October 4, 1994

On Tuesday, October 4, 1994, at 5 pm CDT, STS-68 MCC Status Report #8 reported:

Space Radar Laboratory-2 scientists adjusted their observation plans to take advantage of an opportunity to train their instruments on the islands of Japan following a Tuesday night earthquake there. Endeavour passed over the Sarobetsu, Japan, calibration site about 3:30 pm CDT, and the Synthetic Aperture Radar sent down real-time data of the area below, allowing scientists to look for changes in the coastline of the islands that may have been due to the large tsunami waves associated with the quake. The Spaceborne Imaging Radar also recorded data on the area.

STS-68 crew members continued to perform slight maneuvers to fine-tune Endeavour's orbit to intersect its track on the SRL-1 mission to support a new experiment called interferometry. The trim burns adjusted the orbit to within 30 feet (9.1 m) of where it was in April as it passed over the Mammoth Mountain, Calif., backup supersite. This should allow scientists to make nearly identical measurements with the radar equipment to develop a three-dimensional comparison of environmental changes during the six months separating STS-59 and STS-68.

Radar images over the Sahara desert and the North Atlantic will help scientists evaluate global changes and how they affect the climates in other areas of the world.

— NASA, STS-68 Mission Control Center Status Report #8, October 4, 1994

Also on October 4, Payload Commander Tom Jones discussed the significance of radar systems and the Earth's environment in an interview with ABC's Good Morning America. Mission Specialist Jeff Wisoff discussed the mission with CONUS Communications Syndicate affiliates WTKR-TV in his hometown of Norfolk, Va., and the All News Channel in Minneapolis.

=== October 5, 1994 (Flight Day 6) ===
On Wednesday, October 5, 1994, at 8 am CDT, STS-68 MCC Status Report #9 reported:

Space Radar Laboratory scientists received some images of Japan, near the location of Monday nights earthquake, but any evidence of the natural disaster was not immediately noticeable. Other radar observations during the night included studies of other volcanoes including Mt. Pinatubo in the Philippines, Cotopaxi in Ecuador, and Teide in the Canary Islands.

Radar images processed on the ground included images of Pasadena, California, with sufficient clarity make the Rose Bowl distinguishable, as well as images of Washington State and Yellowstone National Park, both showing scars from forest fires.

During the night, the crew reported a missing thermal tile around one of the overhead windows of the orbiter. The tile apparently came off recently since crew members look out the window often to perform the visual observations that accompany radar operations. Flight controllers report that, while the tile is missing, the underlying thermal blanket is still intact.

Astronaut Linda Godwin, who served as the payload commander on the first Space Radar Laboratory mission in April, briefed the crew from the payload control room about 4:30 am Wednesday, commemorating the tenth anniversary of Challenger's 41-G mission, which carried the Spaceborne Imaging Radar (SIR-B) and the Measurement of Air Pollution by Satellite (MAPS). She also noted the first flight aboard a Shuttle of that radar-imaging equipment on Columbia in November 1981.

— NASA, STS-68 Mission Control Center Status Report #9, October 5, 1994

On Wednesday, October 5, 1994, at 4 pm CDT, STS-68 MCC Status Report #10 reported:

Mission to Planet Earth observations by Endeavour's payload bay radar instruments were being suspended temporarily Wednesday afternoon to save fuel while flight controllers work to fix a minor problem involving the shuttle's small reaction control system jets.

One of the small rocket engines which help control the pointing of the Shuttle was turned off because of a temperature sensor problem. That caused all of the vernier jets, used for delicate pointing control, to be turned off and the larger steering jets to be used. The flight control team late Wednesday decided to allow the Shuttle's pointing to vary over a wider range to save thruster fuel while the initial problem was being addressed. A software change which will disregard the failed temperature sensor should be in place within 24 hours. Radar operations will be resumed once the update is made.

The radar instruments earlier Wednesday collected images over the Kliuchevskoi volcano in Kamchatka, Russia, which erupted about 8 hours after Endeavour's launch Friday. Images also were collected over Yellowstone National Park, Wyo.; Chickasha, Okla.; Ruiz, Columbia; Cuprito, Nevada; Colima, Mexico; the Galapagos Islands and San Juan, Argentina. Observations with the Measurement of Air Pollution from Satellite were taken, with one particular target being line fires in British Columbia, Canada.

— NASA, STS-68 Mission Control Center Status Report #10, October 5, 1994

=== October 6, 1994 (Flight Day 7) ===
On Thursday, October 6, 1994, at 8 am CDT, STS-68 MCC Status Report #11 reported:

Endeavour's small steering jets are now back in continuous operation and Space Radar Laboratory observations are continuing on schedule after Mission Control sent a software update to the shuttle about 3:30 am today.

The software patch accommodated a failed temperature sensor in one of the vernier jets and allows Endeavour's onboard computers to track the operation of the jet via a second sensor located near the failed sensor. While the patch was being developed and tested in simulators, observations by the Space Radar Laboratory continued at a reduced pace.

These small jets were used only when Mission Control had solid, stable communications with the orbiter when ground controllers could monitor the jet firings. The jets were turned off when communications with the shuttle were unavailable or intermittent, a common occurrence during standard shuttle operations.

The observations using the radar systems that were missed while the software patch was being put in place, had been performed at least once previously during the mission and are scheduled for observation again later in the flight. SRL scientists say the impact of the temporary pause is minimal on the scientific investigations under way.

One observation completed during the night was of a controlled oil spill in the North Sea designed to test the radar's ability to discern oil spills from the naturally produced film caused by fish and plankton in the water. In addition to the 106 gallons of diesel oil placed in the water, 26 gallons of algae products were placed in the water nearby for radar comparison. The ground team expected to have the oil spill cleaned up within about two hours using oil-recovery ships in the area. The experiment was conducted to prove the usefulness of radar systems to more rapidly detect spills allowing quicker cleanup.

— NASA, STS-68 Mission Control Center Status Report #11, October 6, 1994

On Thursday, October 6, 1994, at 5 pm CDT, STS-68 MCC Status Report #12 reported:

Endeavour's astronauts this afternoon sent down spectacular videotape views of the west coast of California recorded as the shuttle passed about 115 nautical miles (213 km) overhead on its 103rd orbit. The scenes covered the San Joaquin Valley, San Francisco Bay, Monterey Bay, Los Angeles, Vandenberg Air Force Base and San Diego Bay.

During the next few days, scientists will test a new technique called "interferometry" as the earth observations data collection continues. The technique is expected to yield topographic information of unprecedented clarity by using slightly different shuttle positions to provide three-dimensional images of the terrain below.

Among the Space Radar Laboratory observations today were the North Sea, where scientists intentionally released small oil and algae spills to see how well the SRL-2 instruments could track them, as well as observations of Bebedouro, Brazil; the Western and Northeast Pacific Ocean; Chickasha, Oklahoma; the Gulf of Mexico; Ruiz, Colombia; Sena Madureira, Brazil; Weddell Sea; the Kliuchevskoi Volcano in Kamchatka; Stovepipe Wells, California; and the Galapagos Islands.

Earlier today, the Mission Management Team extended STS-68 by one day to allow additional science. Endeavour is now expected to land at the Kennedy Space Center at about 10:36 am Tuesday.

The orbiter continues to perform well. The only problem reported during the day was the failure of a primary reaction control system jet. The jet problem is not expected to have any effect on the mission since the orbiter has two other jets thrusting in the same direction.

— NASA, STS-68 Mission Control Center Status Report #12, October 6, 1994

=== October 7, 1994 (Flight Day 8) ===
On Friday, October 7, 1994, at 8 am CDT, STS-68 MCC Status Report #13 reported:

Observations made during the night included the volcano Merapi on the Indonesian island of Java; Duke Forest in North Carolina; the Gulf of St. Lawrence; Sydney, Australia; and the volcano Mt. Pinatubo in the Philippines.

Tom Jones, the payload commander for this second flight of SRL, spent some time this morning explaining the importance of the radar's volcanic studies. Demonstrating with three common types of volcanic rock, Jones explained how the radar's various frequencies allow it to map lava and ash flows around volcanoes. The work one day may lead to a permanent radar platform in orbit for use in assisting predictions of impending volcanic eruptions and safeguarding people living near active volcanoes.

Late Thursday, Endeavour's astronauts sent down spectacular views of the west coast of California recorded as the shuttle passed about 115 nautical miles (213 km) overhead on its 103rd orbit. The scenes included the San Joaquin Valley, San Francisco, Monterey Bay, Los Angeles, Vandenberg Air Force Base and San Diego.

— NASA, STS-68 Mission Control Center Status Report #13, October 7, 1994

On Friday, October 7, 1994, at 5 pm CDT, STS-68 MCC Status Report #14 reported:

Astronauts aboard Endeavour and Space Radar Laboratory-2 scientists on the ground today began in earnest to test the new technique of "interferometry" to produce even richer images of the Earth's surface.

From an altitude of 111 nautical miles (206 km), the Spaceborne Imaging Radar and Synthetic Aperture Radar recorded long swaths of interferometric data over central North America, the Amazon forests of central Brazil, and the volcanoes of the Kamchatka Peninsula in Russia.

This morning, Endeavour's orbit was lowered from 117 to 112 nautical miles (217 to 207 km) to support a new technique called "interferometry." The technique is expected to yield topographic information of unprecedented clarity by using slightly different shuttle positions to provide three-dimensional images of the terrain below.

The Measurement of Air Pollution from Satellite experiment also continues to function well, and the crew's infrared film, used to provide complementary still images of fires investigated by MAPS, has been expended. Controlled "line fires" in Ontario, Canada, were set as planned and observed by the crew in an effort to help calibrate the MAPS measurements.

— NASA, STS-68 Mission Control Center Status Report #14, October 7, 1994

=== October 8, 1994 (Flight Day 9) ===
On Saturday, October 8, 1994, at 5 am CDT, STS-68 MCC Status Report #15 reported:

As Endeavour's seventh mission in space reaches the home stretch, scientific observations turn to the gathering of near three-dimensional views of various sites around the world to better understand climatic changes. The six crew members discussed the mission and the future of radar observations of the Earth during a news conference this morning.

The radar array aboard the shuttle began a series of observations above volcanoes, glaciers and other sites designed to create 3D images. These spaceborne radar images, produced regularly on a long-term basis, eventually could provide scientists with insight into movements of the Earth's surface as small as a fraction of an inch.

Such close monitoring may allow scientists to detect pre-eruptive changes in volcanoes and movements in fault lines that precede earthquakes, providing an early warning of imminent natural hazards. Other future applications could include tracking the rate of global warming by monitoring the movement of glaciers and the tracking of floods and mudslides.

Earlier this morning, Mission Specialist Dan Bursch took a break from his work to provide a television tour of the crew's orbital home office, explaining the shuttle's displays, controls, computers and cameras, as well as living accommodations.

— NASA, STS-68 Mission Control Center Status Report #15, October 8, 1994

=== October 9, 1994 (Flight Day 10) ===
On Sunday, October 9, 1994, at 9 am CDT, STS-68 MCC Status Report #16 reported:

It has seemed like deja vu on board Endeavour as the crew spent much of the last 24 hours precisely repeating many Space Radar Laboratory observations to provide scientists with duplicate images for highly accurate three-dimensional maps of volcanoes, glaciers and other phenomena.

Overnight, Mission Specialists Jeff Wisoff and Steve Smith replaced one of three payload recorders which malfunctioned yesterday. The procedure, which the two astronauts trained for prior to the mission, was completed in about an hour and a half. Although only two of the payload high data rate recorders were functioning, the planned observations by the radar lab were not interrupted. The two recorders alone were sufficient for retaining the radar data obtained during the overnight shift of astronauts Smith, Dan Bursch and Tom Jones.

Small engine firings by Endeavour late yesterday aligned the spacecraft's trajectory to within an estimated 20 metres (66 ft) of what had been planned when the spacecraft's orbit was lowered on Friday. This permits the precise repeat observations by the radar.

During the night, Bursch and Smith took a break from their environmental studies to talk with KGO Radio in San Francisco. The interview included phone-in questions from area children.

— NASA, STS-68 Mission Control Center Status Report #16, October 9, 1994

=== October 10, 1994 (Flight Day 11) ===
On Monday, October 10, 1994, at 10 am CDT, STS-68 MCC Status Report #16 reported:

In low Earth orbit, Endeavour's systems are being checked out today to ensure they are healthy and ready to support landing Tuesday. The flight control surfaces will be tested using one of the hydraulic systems called an Auxiliary Power Unit, and ground station communications checks will be done. Interferometry data gathering with the radar instruments in the orbiter's payload bay continued throughout the night and morning prior to the scheduled deactivation of the X-band Synthetic Aperture Radar. Interferometry will allow scientists to overlay radar images of the same site taken on successive days forming a three-dimensional image of the Earth's surface. These topographical images can be used to create a baseline used to understand the changes in the environmental and ecological climate around the world.

— NASA, STS-68 Mission Control Center Status Report #16, October 10, 1994

== See also ==
- List of human spaceflights
- List of Space Shuttle missions
- Mission: Earth, Voyage to the Home Planet
- Outline of space science
- Space Shuttle
