= Gustav Blaha =

Austrian footballer (1888–1961)

August "Gustav" Blaha (1 January 1888 – 25 September 1961) was an Austrian football player. He was born in Vienna. He played for the club SK Rapid Wien, and also for the Austria national football team. He competed at the 1912 Summer Olympics in Stockholm.
