= Natália Blahová =

Slovak politician

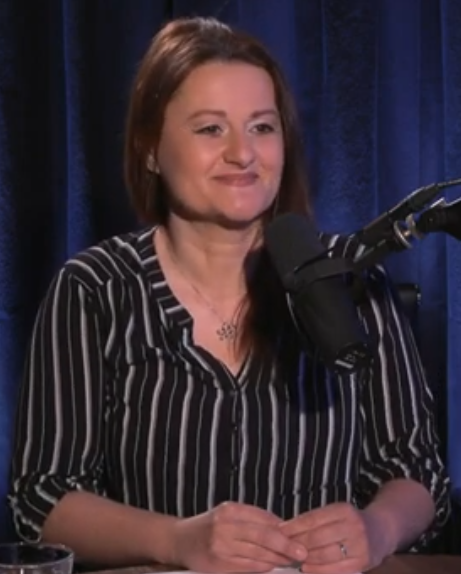
- In a 2022 interview

Member of the National Council of the Slovak Republic
- In office 2016–2020

Vice-Chairwoman of the Social Affairs Committee of the National Council of the Slovak Republic
- In office 2010–2012

Personal details
- Born: Natália Kániková; 19 February 1974 (age 52) Trnava, Czechoslovakia
- Party: Freedom and Solidarity (2009–2019); Democratic Party (from 2019)
- Education: Constantine the Philosopher University in Nitra; Comenius University
- Occupation: Politician, teacher

Natália Blahová (birth name Natália Kániková; born 19 February 1974) is a Slovak politician, who served as a Member of the National Council of the Slovak Republic for the Freedom and Solidarity (SaS) party from 2010 to 2012 and from 2016 to 2020. In 2019, she was expelled from SaS and subsequently joined the Democratic Party.

== Biography ==
Blahová was born Natália Kániková on 19 February 1974 in Trnava, Czechoslovakia. From 1989 to 1992 she studied at the Ján Hollý Gymnasium in Trnava. In 1999 she graduated from the Faculty of Education at the University of Constantine the Philosopher in Nitra. In 2009 she graduated from the Department of Social Work at the Faculty of Education of Comenius University in Bratislava.

Since 1998 she has worked as a teacher and educator. Since 2006 she has worked for the Association of Foster Families as a social counsellor for foster parenting, focusing on accompaniment, representation and legal counselling. During this period she also worked as an external collaborator of the Civic Association Návrat as a counsellor for surrogate parenthood and coordinator of the Surrogate Families Club. She is the editor of the professional journal on surrogate parenthood, Not Being Alone.

Since 2012 she has been working as a social counsellor at the Association of Surrogate Families.

As of 2021, she is working as a social counsellor.

== Political career ==
Since 2006 she has been a civil activist focusing on children's rights and civil rights.

After the 2010 elections, she became a member of the Slovak Parliament for the Freedom and Solidarity Party. She was vice-chair of the Social Affairs Committee of the National Assembly. She worked as an external advisor to the Minister of Labour, Social Affairs and Family on family policy.

She stood as a candidate for SaS in the early parliamentary elections in 2012, but did not make it to Parliament.

In 2014, she unsuccessfully stood as a candidate for SaS in the European elections.

She was the 12th candidate for the SaS party in the 2016 parliamentary elections. She received 9 226 valid preferential votes. She was the chairwoman of the SaS parliamentary caucus and the verifier of the Committee on Human Rights and National Minorities of the Slovak Parliament.

In April 2017, she initiated the dismissal of the Minister of Labour, Social Affairs and Family Ján Richter. Blaha's blog started the Clean Day case. She gave a nearly three-hour speech at the meeting where she quoted from the testimonies of alleged former clients of the facility. In the end, the minister was not recalled at the night session: 57 MPs were in favour, 68 against and two did not vote.

After she wrote that she considered SaS to be a dangerous party, she was expelled from the party by secret ballot by 83 of the 112 attendees at the party's congress in October 2019, following a motion by Michal Sklienka that she was damaging the party's reputation and thus violating the party's statutes.

She has already run as the 3rd candidate on the Democratic Party ticket in the February 2020 general election.
