= Joseph C. Blaha =

American businessman and politician

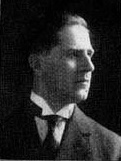
- Official portrait, 1911

Member of the Illinois House of Representatives from the 19th district
- In office 1911–1913

Chicago Alderman from the 34th Ward
- In office 1915–1917 Serving with John Toman
- Preceded by: Winfield J. Held
- Succeeded by: Joseph O. Kostner

Personal details
- Born: August 15, 1877 Chicago, Illinois
- Died: April 1, 1944 (aged 66) Chicago, Illinois
- Party: Republican
- Occupation: Businessman and merchant

Joseph C. Blaha (August 15, 1877 – April 1, 1944) was an American businessman and politician.

Blaha was born in Chicago, Illinois. He went to the Chicago parochial schools and to St. Ignatius College Prep School. Blaha was involved in the real estate and insurance business. He was also a merchant. Blaha served in the Illinois House of Representatives from 1911 through 1913, representing the 19th district as a Republican. He also served on the Chicago City Council from the 34th Ward, from 1915 through 1917. Blaha died in Chicago, Illinois.
