= STS-79 =

1996 American crewed spaceflight to Mir

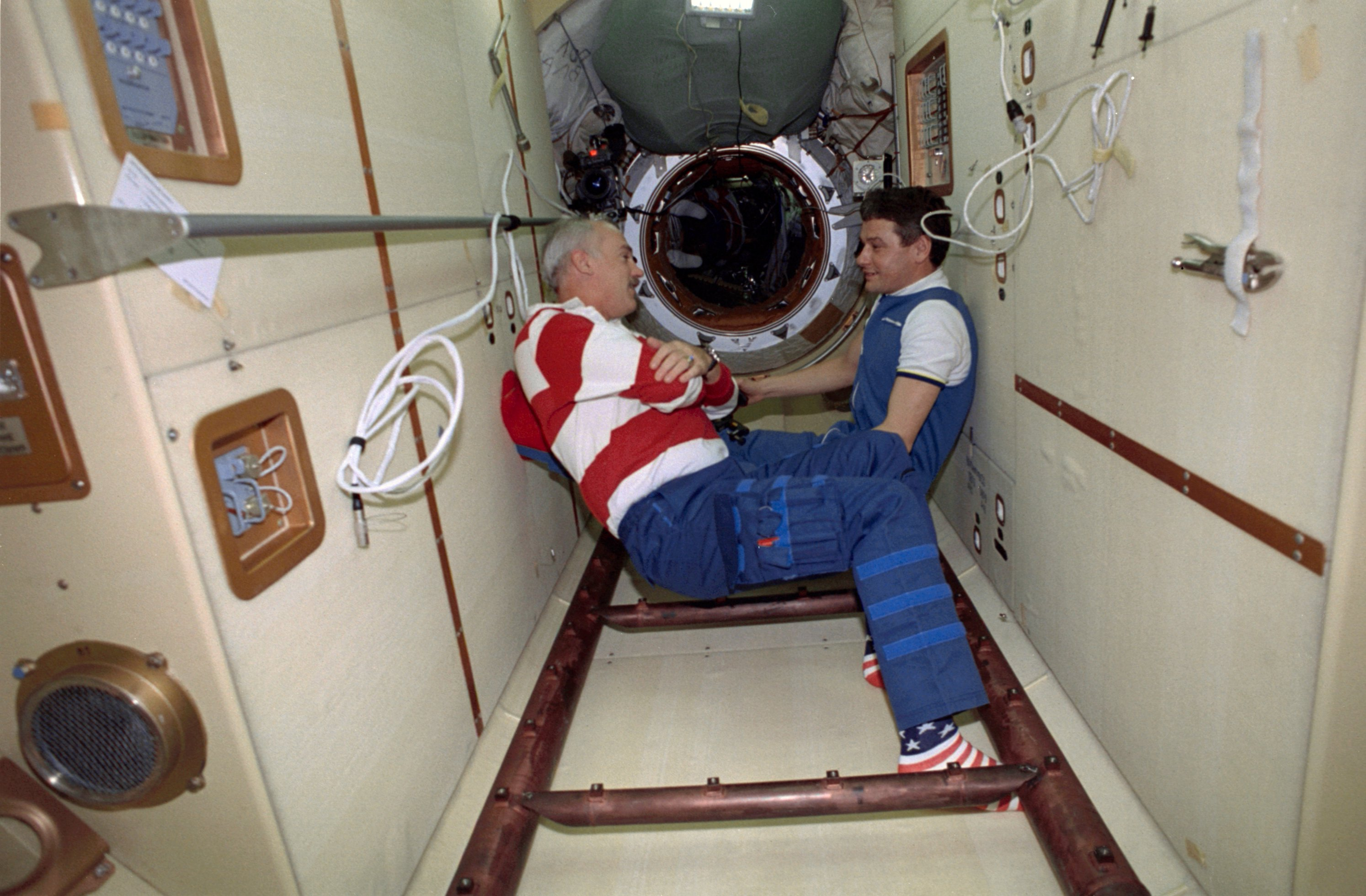
- STS-79 commander Readdy (left) and Mir EO-22 commander Korzun (right) in Mir's Docking Module
- Mission type: Shuttle–Mir program
- Operator: NASA
- COSPAR ID: 1996-057A
- SATCAT no.: 24324
- Mission duration: 10 days, 3 hours, 18 minutes and 24 seconds
- Distance travelled: 6,300,000 km (3,900,000 mi)
- Orbits completed: 160

Spacecraft properties
- Spacecraft: Space Shuttle Atlantis

Crew
- Crew size: 6
- Members: William F. Readdy; Terrence W. Wilcutt; Jerome Apt; Thomas D. Akers; Carl E. Walz
- Launching: John E. Blaha
- Landing: Shannon W. Lucid

Start of mission
- Launch date: 16 September 1996, 08:54:49 UTC (4:54:49 am EDT)
- Launch site: Kennedy, LC-39A
- Contractor: United Space Alliance

End of mission
- Landing date: 26 September 1996, 12:13:13 UTC (8:13:13 am EDT)
- Landing site: Kennedy, SLF Runway 15

Orbital parameters
- Reference system: Geocentric orbit
- Regime: Low Earth orbit
- Perigee altitude: 368 km (229 mi)
- Apogee altitude: 386 km (240 mi)
- Inclination: 51.6°
- Period: 92.1 minutes

Docking with Mir
- Docking port: SO starboard
- Docking date: 19 September 1996, 03:13:18 UTC
- Undocking date: 24 September 1996, 01:31:34 UTC
- Time docked: 4 days, 22 hours, 18 minutes and 16 seconds
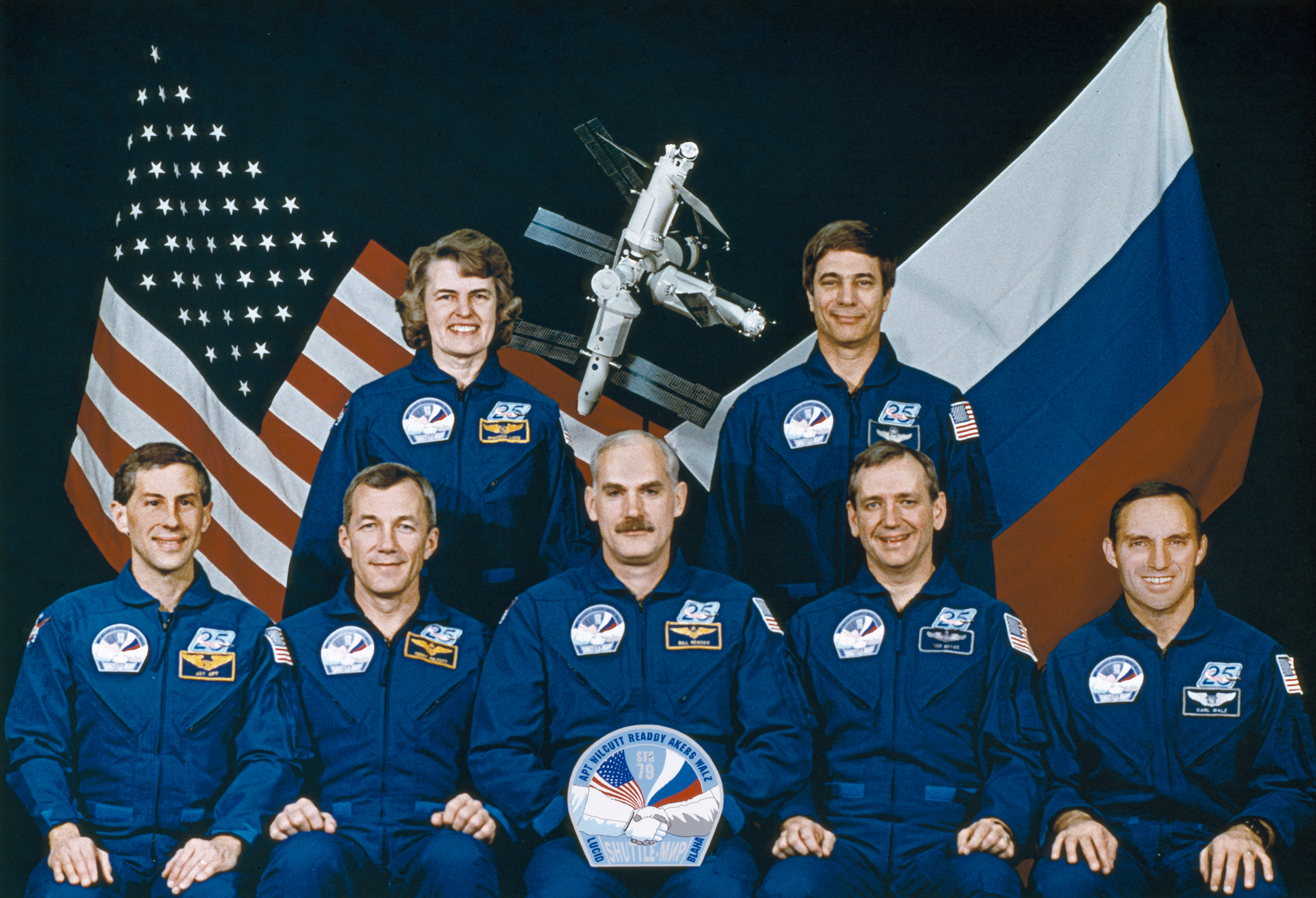
- Seated, from left: Apt, Wilcutt, Readdy, Akers and Walz; Standing: Lucid and Blaha Space Shuttle program

STS-79 was the 17th flight of Space Shuttle Atlantis, and the 79th mission of the Space Shuttle program. The flight saw Atlantis dock with the Russian space station Mir to deliver equipment, supplies and to exchange personnel participating in long-duration stays aboard the station as part of the Shuttle–Mir program. A variety of scientific experiments were also conducted aboard Atlantis by her crew. It was the first shuttle mission to rendezvous with a fully assembled Mir, and the fourth rendezvous of a shuttle to the space station.

== Crew ==
Position	Launching Astronaut	Landing Astronaut
Commander	William F. Readdy; Third and last spaceflight	
Pilot	Terrence W. Wilcutt; Second spaceflight	
Mission Specialist 1	Jay Apt; Fourth and last spaceflight	
Mission Specialist 2 Flight Engineer	Thomas D. Akers; Fourth and last spaceflight	
Mission Specialist 3	Carl E. Walz; Third spaceflight	
Mission Specialist 4	John E. Blaha; EO-22; Fifth and last spaceflight	Shannon W. Lucid; EO-22; Fifth and last spaceflight

=== Crew seat assignments ===
Seat	Launch	Landing	Seats 1–4 are on the flight deck. Seats 5–7 are on the mid-deck.
1	Readdy		Seats 1–4 are on the flight deck. Seats 5–7 are on the mid-deck.
2	Wilcutt		Seats 1–4 are on the flight deck. Seats 5–7 are on the mid-deck.
3	Apt	Walz	Seats 1–4 are on the flight deck. Seats 5–7 are on the mid-deck.
4	Akers		Seats 1–4 are on the flight deck. Seats 5–7 are on the mid-deck.
5	Walz	Apt	Seats 1–4 are on the flight deck. Seats 5–7 are on the mid-deck.
6	Blaha	Lucid	Seats 1–4 are on the flight deck. Seats 5–7 are on the mid-deck.
7	Unused		Seats 1–4 are on the flight deck. Seats 5–7 are on the mid-deck.

== Mission highlights ==
STS-79 was the first shuttle mission to a fully completed Mir space station, following the arrival of its Priroda module. Atlantis carried the 1,821-kilogram (4,015 lb) Orbiter Docking System. This spaceflight was highlighted by the collection of American astronaut Shannon Lucid after 188 days in space, the first American crewmember exchange aboard the Russian Space Station Mir, and the fourth Shuttle-Mir docking. Lucid's long-duration spaceflight set a new American record, as well as worldwide spaceflight record for a woman astronaut. She embarked to Mir March 22 on the STS-76 mission. Succeeding her on Mir for an approximately four-month stay was John Blaha, who returned in January 1997 with the STS-81 crew. American astronaut Jerry Linenger replaced him.

STS-79 also marked the second flight of the SPACEHAB module in support of a Shuttle-Mir docking and the first flight of the SPACEHAB Double Module configuration. The forward portion of the double module housed experiments conducted by the crew before, during and after Atlantis was docked to the Russian space station. The aft portion of the double module housed the logistics equipment to be transferred to Mir, which included food, clothing, experiments, supplies, and spare equipment. The mass of the module was 4,774 kilograms (10,525 lb). Among the experiments performed inside SPACEHAB was testing of the Czech microaccelerometer MACEK.

The Shuttle-Mir link-up occurred at 15:13 UTC on September 18, following R-bar approach. Hatches opened at 05:40 on September 19, and Blaha and Lucid exchanged places at 11:00. Awaiting Blaha on Mir were Valery Korzun, Mir 22 commander, and Alexander Kaleri, flight engineer.

During five days of mated operations, the two crews transferred more than 1,814 kilograms (3,999 lb) of supplies to Mir, including logistics, food, and water generated by Atlantis's fuel cells. Three experiments were also transferred: the Biotechnology System (BTS) for study of cartilage development; the Material in Devices as Superconductors (MIDAS) experiment to measure electrical properties of high-temperature superconductor materials; and the Commercial Generic Bioprocessing Apparatus (CGBA), containing several smaller experiments, including self-contained aquatic systems.

About 907 kilograms (2,000 lb) of experiment samples and equipment were transferred from Mir to Atlantis and the total logistical transfer to and from station of more than 2,722 kilograms (6,001 lb) was the most extensive to date. During her approximately six-month stay on Mir, Lucid conducted research in the following fields: advanced technology, Earth sciences, fundamental biology, human life sciences, microgravity research and space sciences. Specific experiments included: Environmental Radiation Measurements to ascertain ionizing radiation levels aboard Mir; Greenhouse-Integrated Plant Experiments, to study effect of microgravity on plants, specifically dwarf wheat; and Assessment of Humoral Immune Function During Long-Duration Space Flight, to gather data on effect of long-term spaceflight on the human immune system and involving collection of blood serum and saliva samples. Some of this research was conducted in the newest and final Mir module, Priroda, which arrived at station during Lucid's stay.

Three experiments remained on Atlantis: Extreme Temperature Translation Furnace (ETTF), a new furnace design allowing space-based processing up to 871 degrees Celsius (1,600 degrees Fahrenheit) and above; Commercial Protein Crystal Growth (CPCG) complement of 128 individual samples involving 12 different proteins; and Mechanics of Granular Materials, designed to further understanding of behavior of cohesionless granular materials, which could in turn lead to better understanding of how Earth's surface responds during earthquakes and landslides.

As with all Shuttle-Mir flights, risk-mitigation experiments were conducted to help reduce development risk for the International Space Station. Flying for first time was the Active Rack Isolation System (ARIS), an experiment rack designed to cushion payloads from vibration and other disturbances.

Conducted near the end of STS-79 was a test using Atlantis's small vernier jets to lower her orbit. A similar maneuver was made at end of second Hubble Space Telescope servicing mission, STS-82, to re-boost Hubble to a higher orbit while still in orbiter payload bay.

== Gallery ==
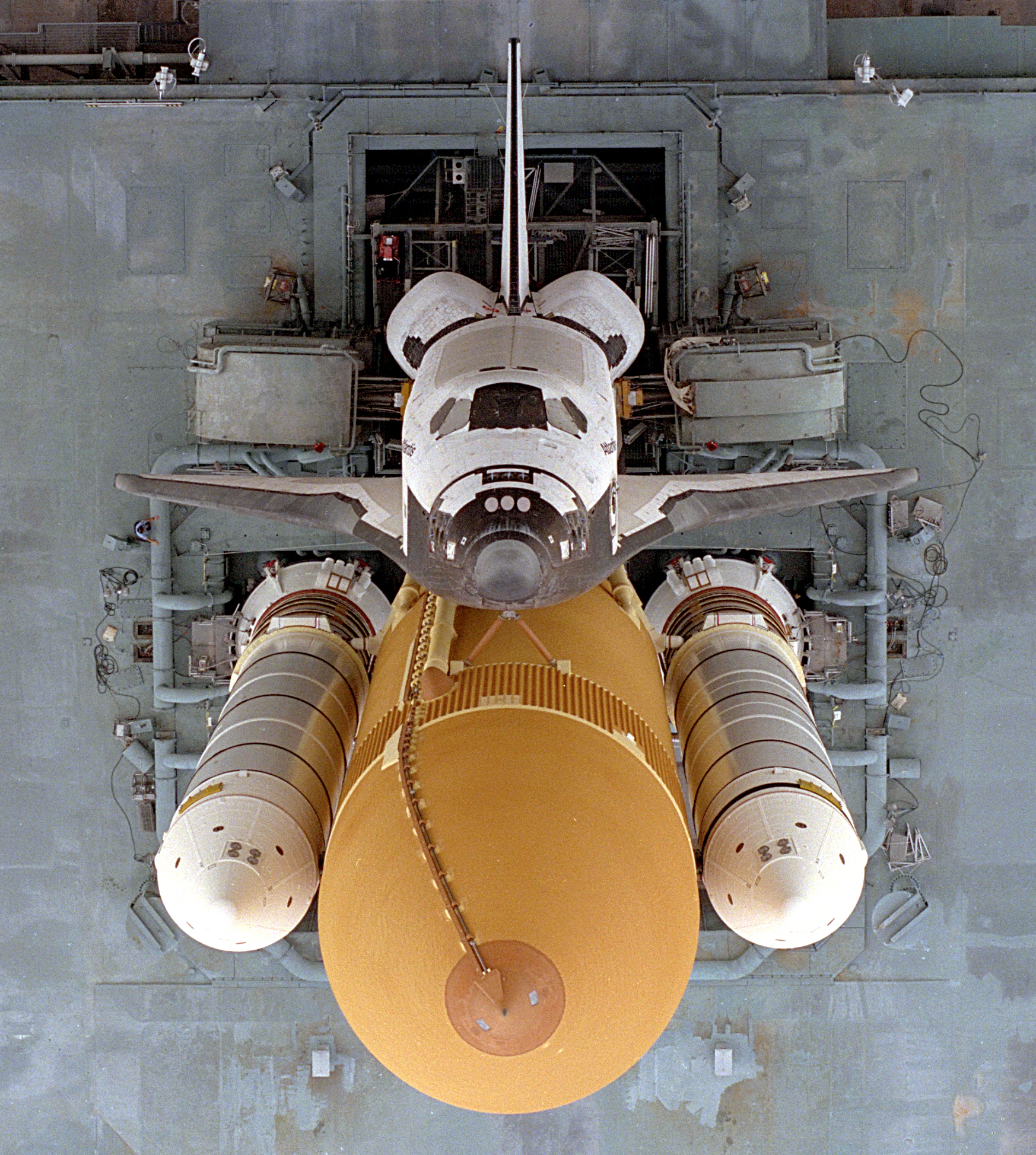
An overhead view of Atlantis as she sits atop the mobile launcher platform (MLP) before the launch of STS-79.

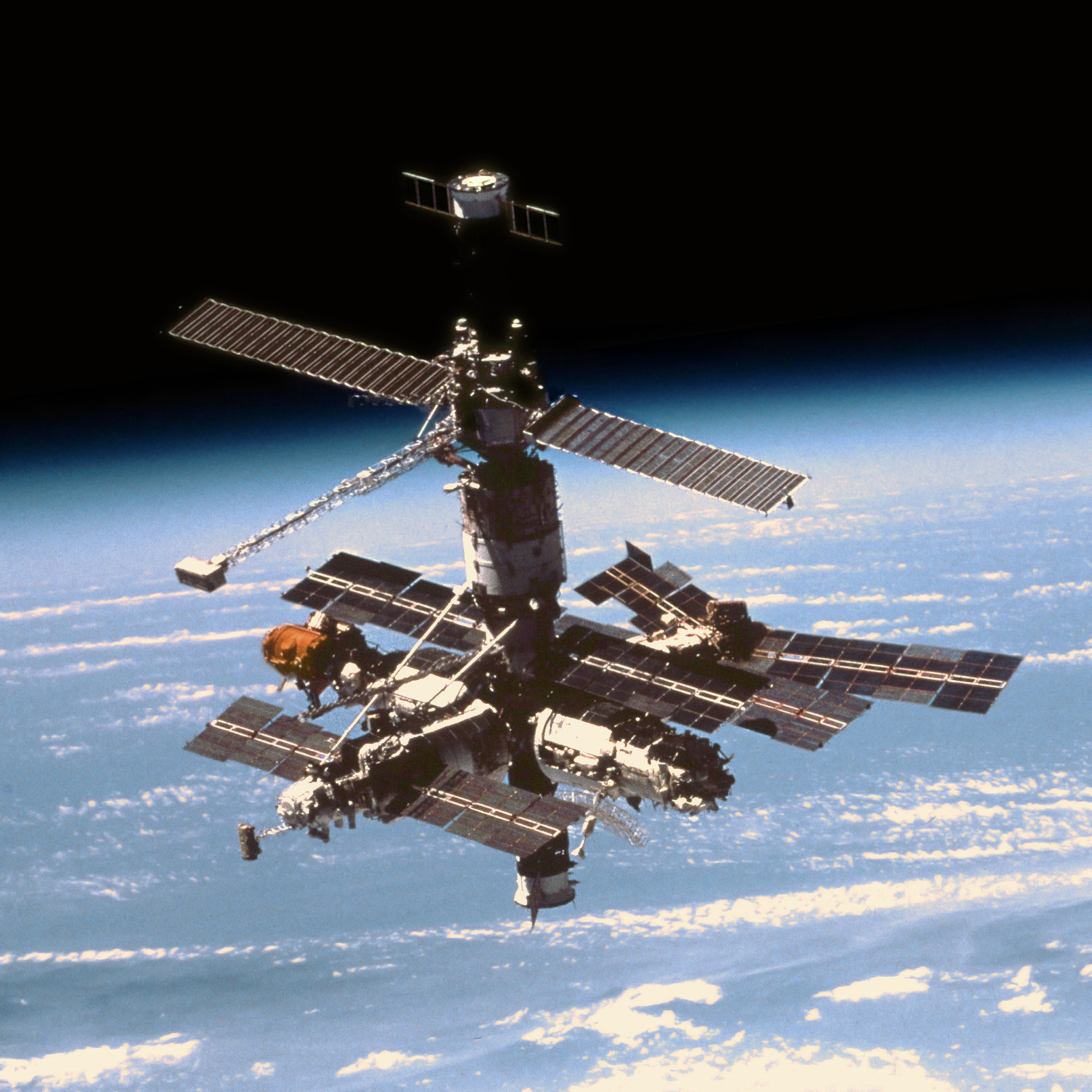
Mir as seen during the undocking of Atlantis.

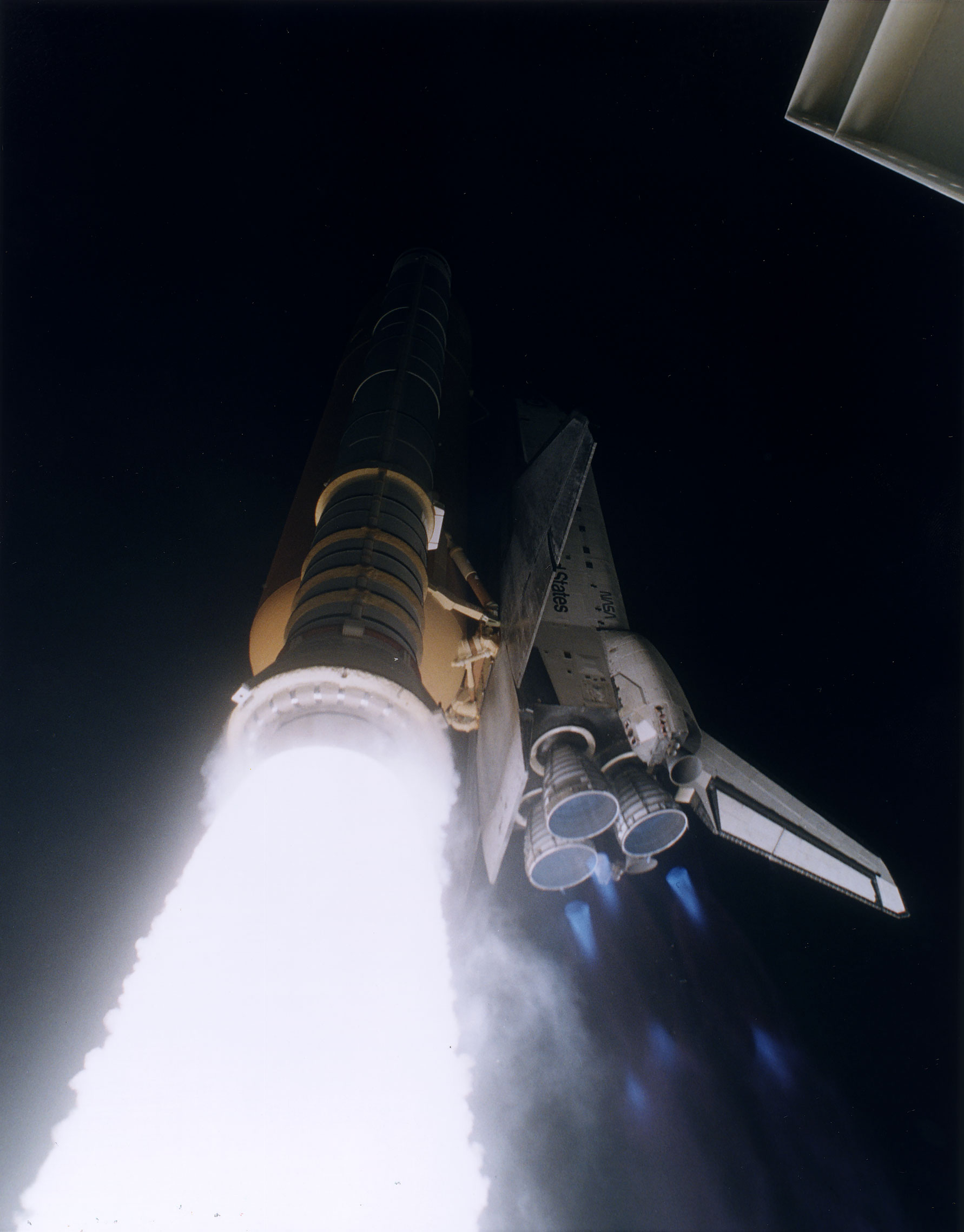
Launch of STS-79

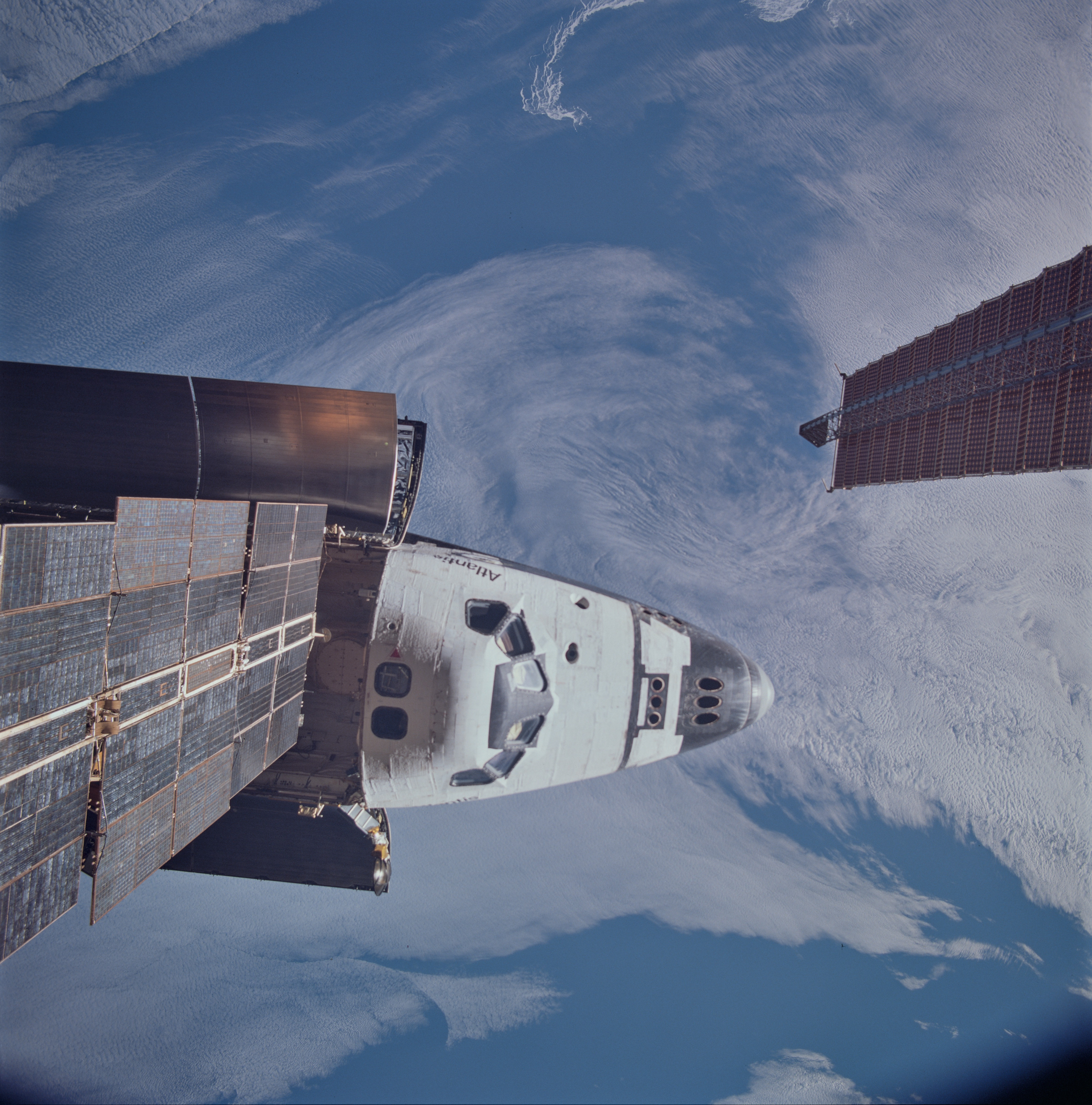
Atlantis docked to Mir over the Indian ocean

== See also ==
- List of human spaceflights
- List of Space Shuttle missions
- Outline of space science
