= John E. Blaha =

American astronaut (born 1942)

John Blaha
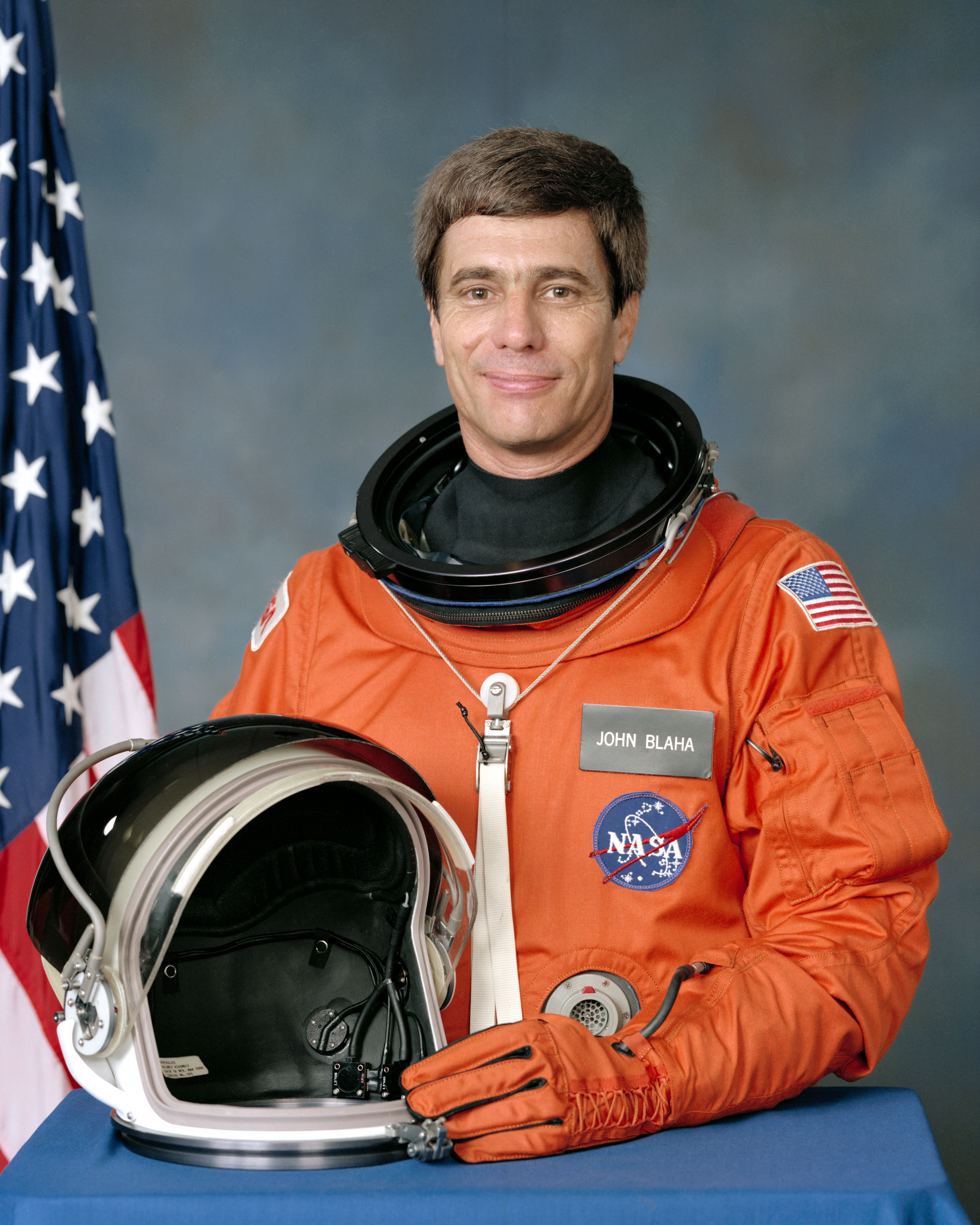
- Born: John Elmer Blaha; August 26, 1942 (age 84); San Antonio, Texas, U.S.
- Education: United States Air Force Academy (BS); Purdue University (MS)
- Space career

NASA astronaut
- Rank: Colonel, US Air Force
- Time in space: 161 days, 2 hours and 45 minutes
- Selection: NASA Group 9 (1980)
- Mission: STS-29; STS-33; STS-43; STS-58; STS-79/STS-81 (Mir EO‑22)

John Elmer Blaha (born August 26, 1942, in San Antonio, Texas) is a retired United States Air Force colonel and a former NASA astronaut. He is a veteran of five space missions aboard the Space Shuttle and Mir.

Blaha is married to the former Brenda I. Walters of St. Louis, Missouri. They have three children.

== Education ==
Blaha graduated from Granby High School in Norfolk, Virginia, in 1960; received a Bachelor of Science in engineering science from the United States Air Force Academy in 1965; and received a Master of Science in astronautical engineering from Purdue University in 1966.

== Air Force service ==
Blaha received his pilot wings at Williams Air Force Base, Arizona, in 1967. He was subsequently assigned as an operational pilot flying F-4, F-102, F-106, and A-37 aircraft (completing 361 combat missions in Vietnam). He attended the USAF Aerospace Research Pilot School at Edwards Air Force Base, California, in 1971, and piloted the NF-104 research aircraft to 104,400 feet. Following graduation, he served as an F-104 instructor pilot at the test pilot school, teaching low lift-to-drag approach, zoom, performance, stability/control, and spin flight test techniques. In 1973, he was assigned as a test pilot working with the Royal Air Force at the Aeroplane and Armament Experimental Establishment, Boscombe Down, United Kingdom. During a three-year tour, he flew stability/control, performance, spin, and weapons delivery flight tests in the SEPECAT Jaguar, Blackburn Buccaneer, BAE Hawk, and BAC Jet Provost aircraft. In 1976, he attended the U.S. Air Force Air Command and Staff College. After graduation, he was assigned to work for the Assistant Chief of Staff, Studies and Analyses, at Headquarters USAF in the Pentagon. During this tour, he presented F-15 Eagle and F-16 Fighting Falcon study results to Department of Defense, State Department, and Congressional staffs.

== NASA ==
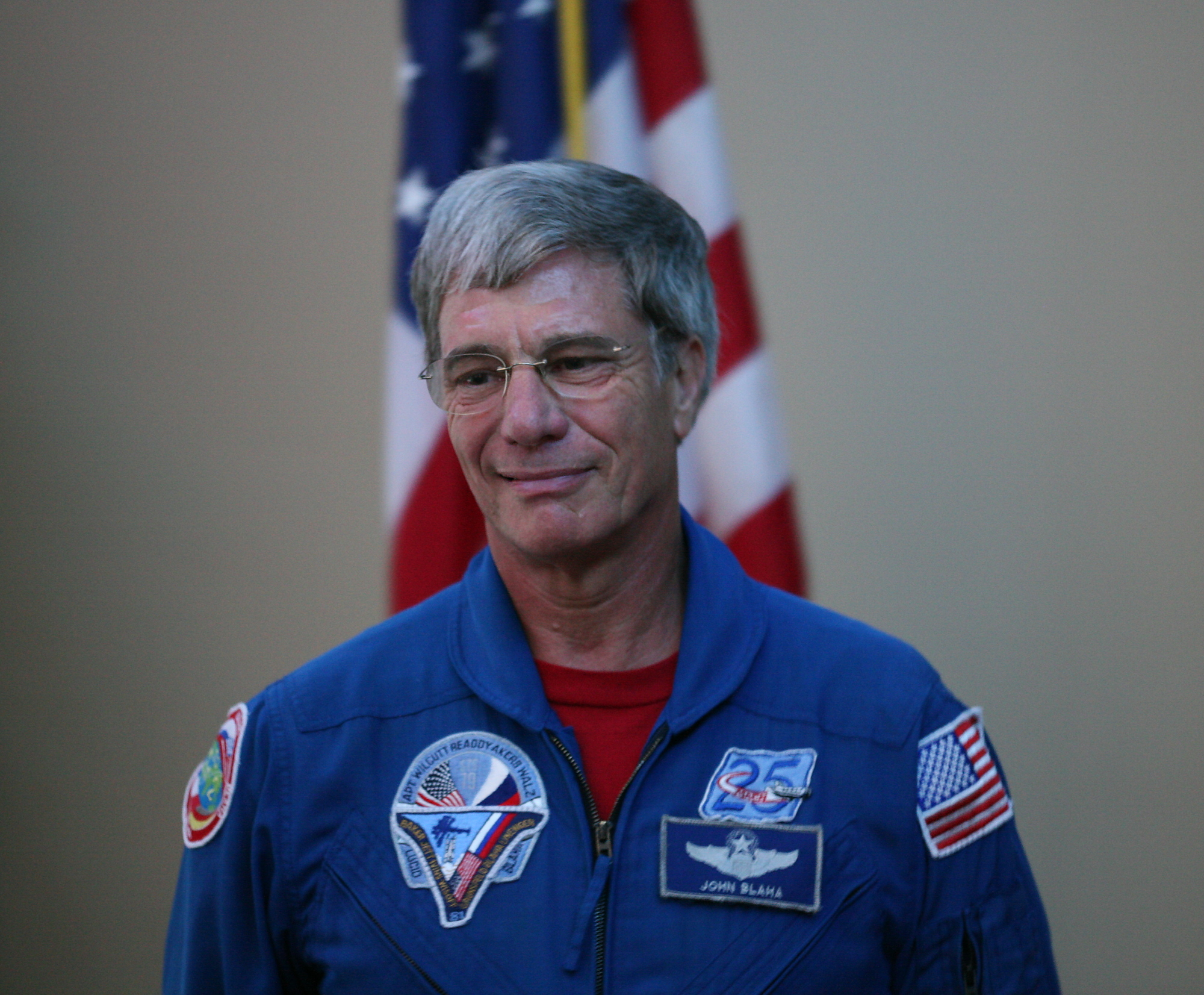
John Blaha at Kennedy Space Center in Nov '08 after a Meet an Astronaut event

Selected as an astronaut in May 1980, Blaha has logged 161 days in space on five space missions.

In addition to flying five space missions, Blaha has served as the chairman, NASA Space Flight Safety Panel; weather manager, Mission Management Team; lead spacecraft communicator; member, NASA Space Shuttle Improvement Panel. Blaha also led the design, development, and integration of the Orbiter Head Up Display system. Additionally, he led the development of contingency abort procedures which significantly improve crew survivability in the event of multiple main engine failures during ascent. He has logged more than 7,000 hours of flying time in 34 different aircraft, and has written numerous technical articles on spacecraft performance and control.

Blaha retired from NASA in September 1997 to return to his hometown of San Antonio, Texas, where he joined the executive management team of the United Services Automobile Association.

=== Space flights ===
==== STS-29 ====
STS-29 was a NASA Space Shuttle mission using the Discovery. Launched on March 13, 1989, from the Kennedy Space Center's Launch Complex 39B, its main objective was the deployment of the Tracking and Data Relay Satellite (TDRS-D). Blaha served as the pilot of the STS-29 mission, marking his first spaceflight. In this role, Blaha supported the commander during the launch, orbit, and landing procedures. Additionally, he was involved in on-orbit operations.

==== STS-33 ====
STS-33 was a NASA Space Shuttle mission involving the Discovery. The shuttle was launched on November 23, 1989, from Launch Complex 39B. Blaha was chosen for this mission as a replacement for S. David Griggs, who died in an accident in June 1989. This marked the first crew substitution of its kind since the Apollo 13 mission. The Discovery completed its mission objectives and returned to Earth, landing on November 28, 1989, at Edwards Air Force Base on Runway 22.

==== STS-43 ====
STS-43 was a shuttle mission aboard the Atlantis. The shuttle launched on August 2, 1991, from Launch Complex 39A. One of the primary objectives of the mission was the deployment of the fifth Tracking and Data Relay Satellite, TDRS-E. Blaha served as the commander, marking his third mission to space and his first as commander. In addition to the deployment of TDRS-E, the STS-43 crew conducted various secondary payloads and experiments, which contributed to advancements in a range of scientific fields. The Atlantis successfully concluded its mission by landing on August 11, 1991, at the Shuttle Landing Facility.

==== STS-58 ====
STS-58 was a shuttle mission utilizing the Columbia. The shuttle launched on October 18, 1993, from Launch Complex 39B. Blaha served as the commander for this mission, marking his fourth journey to space. The mission's emphasis was on biomedical studies under the Spacelab Life Sciences (SLS-2) program. This program involved a comprehensive set of experiments to study the physiological effects of prolonged spaceflight. With a duration of 14 days, 0 hours, 12 minutes, and 32 seconds, STS-58 became the longest mission of the Space Shuttle program. The Columbia completed its mission by landing on November 1, 1993, at 15:05:42 UTC at the Edwards Air Force Base, touching down on Runway 22.

==== Mir ====
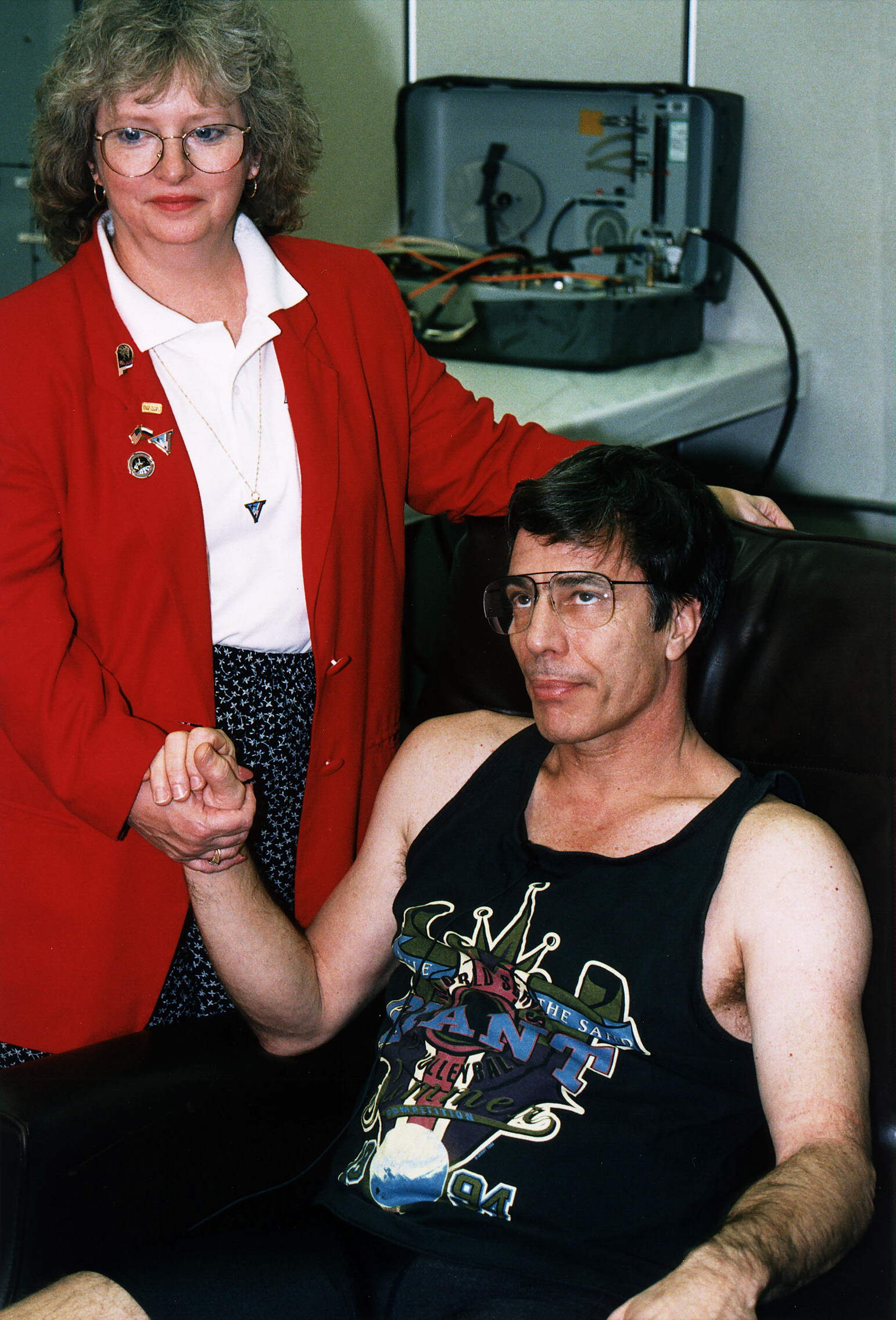
Blaha with his wife, Brenda, after his return to Earth from Mir

Blaha began Russian language training in August 1994 at the Defense Language Institute in Monterey, California, and commenced an intensive training program at the Gagarin Cosmonaut Training Center, Star City, Russia in January 1995. He launched on STS-79 on September 16, 1996. After docking he transferred to the Mir Space Station. Assigned as a Board Engineer 2, he spent the following 4 months with the Mir 22 Cosmonaut crew conducting material science, fluid science, and life science research. Blaha returned to Earth aboard STS-81 on January 22, 1997.

Blaha was not permitted to vote in the November 1996 election, because his mission on Mir began before ballots were finalized and lasted beyond Election Day. In 1997, Texas amended its election statutes to permit voting from space, as a result of his predicament.

== Honors ==
- Defense Superior Service Medal
- Legion of Merit
- Distinguished Flying Crosses (two)
- Defense Meritorious Service Medal
- Meritorious Service Medals (three)
- Air Medals (18)
- Air Force Commendation Medal
- NASA Distinguished Service Medals (two)
- NASA Outstanding Leadership Medal
- NASA Exceptional Service Medal
- NASA Space Flight Medals (five)
- Air Force Cross (United Kingdom)
- Russian Order of Friendship
- Vietnam Cross of Gallantry
- Purdue Outstanding Aerospace Engineer Award
- Purdue Engineering Alumnus Award
- Outstanding Pilot, F-4 Combat Crew Training
- Outstanding Junior Officer of the Year, 3d Tactical Fighter Wing
- Distinguished Graduate U.S. Air Force Test Pilot School
- Distinguished Graduate Air Command and Staff College
- Countdown Magazine Outstanding Astronaut of 1991
- University Roundtable Annual Best and Brightest Award
- Name given to minor planet 22442 Blaha
- Grand Marshal Fiesta Flambeau Parade
- Grand Marshal Battle of Flowers Parade
- Granby High School Hall of Fame
- Astronaut Hall of Fame (May 2008).
