= Satellite laser ranging =

Type of satellite laser

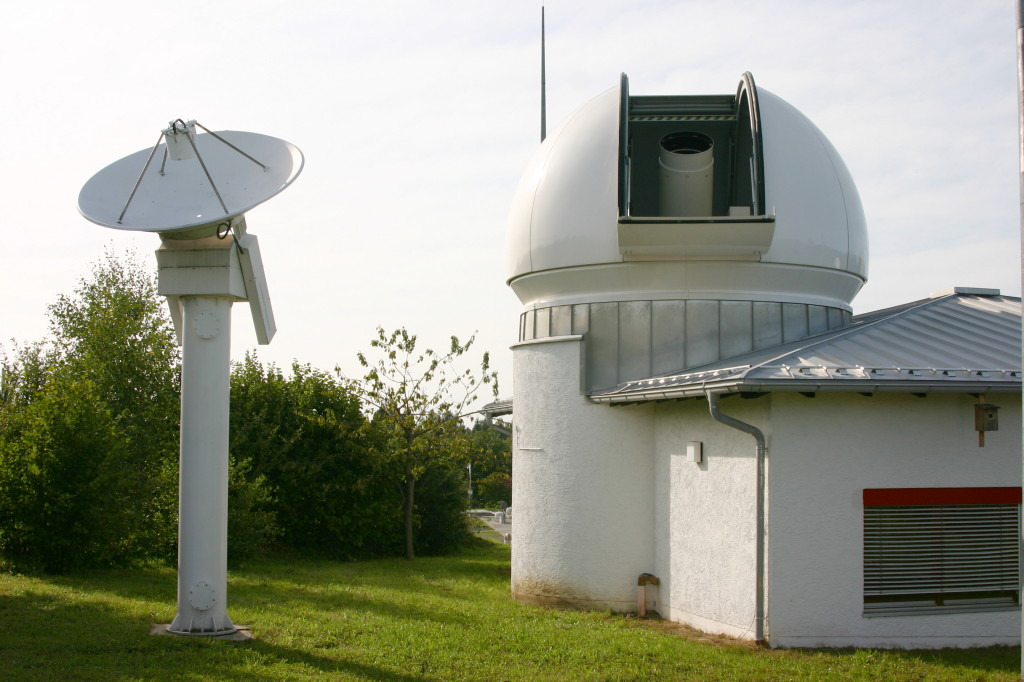
Laser Ranging System of the geodetic observatory Wettzell, Bavaria

Satellite laser ranging (SLR) is a method to measure the distance to satellites in a geocentric orbit. It consists of an astronomical observatory equipped with a laser that sends ultrashort pulses of light. The pulses hit the satellite and bounce back to be caught by the station, which measure the round trip time with the speed of light formula. These measurements are instantaneous and with millimeter level precision, which can be accumulated to provide accurate measurement of orbits and a host of important scientific data. Some satellites have retroreflectors, but the method also works on space debris.

Satellite laser ranging is a proven geodetic technique with significant potential for important contributions to scientific studies of the earth/atmosphere/ocean system. It is the most accurate technique currently available to determine the geocentric position of an Earth satellite, allowing for the precise calibration of radar altimeters and separation of long-term instrumentation drift from secular changes in ocean topography.

Its ability to measure the variations over time in Earth's gravity field and to monitor motion of the station network with respect to the geocenter, together with the capability to monitor vertical motion in an absolute system, makes it unique for modeling and evaluating long-term climate change by:

- providing a reference system for post-glacial rebound, plate tectonics, sea level and ice volume change
- determining the temporal mass redistribution of the solid earth, ocean, and atmosphere system
- determining Earth orientation parameters, such as Earth pole coordinates and length-of-day variations
- determining of precise satellite orbits for artificial satellites with and without active devices onboard
- monitoring the response of the atmosphere to seasonal variations in solar heating.

SLR provides a unique capability for verification of the predictions of the theory of general relativity, such as the frame-dragging effect.

SLR stations form an important part of the international network of space geodetic observatories, which include VLBI, GPS, DORIS and PRARE systems. On several critical missions, SLR has provided failsafe redundancy when other radiometric tracking systems have failed.

== History ==
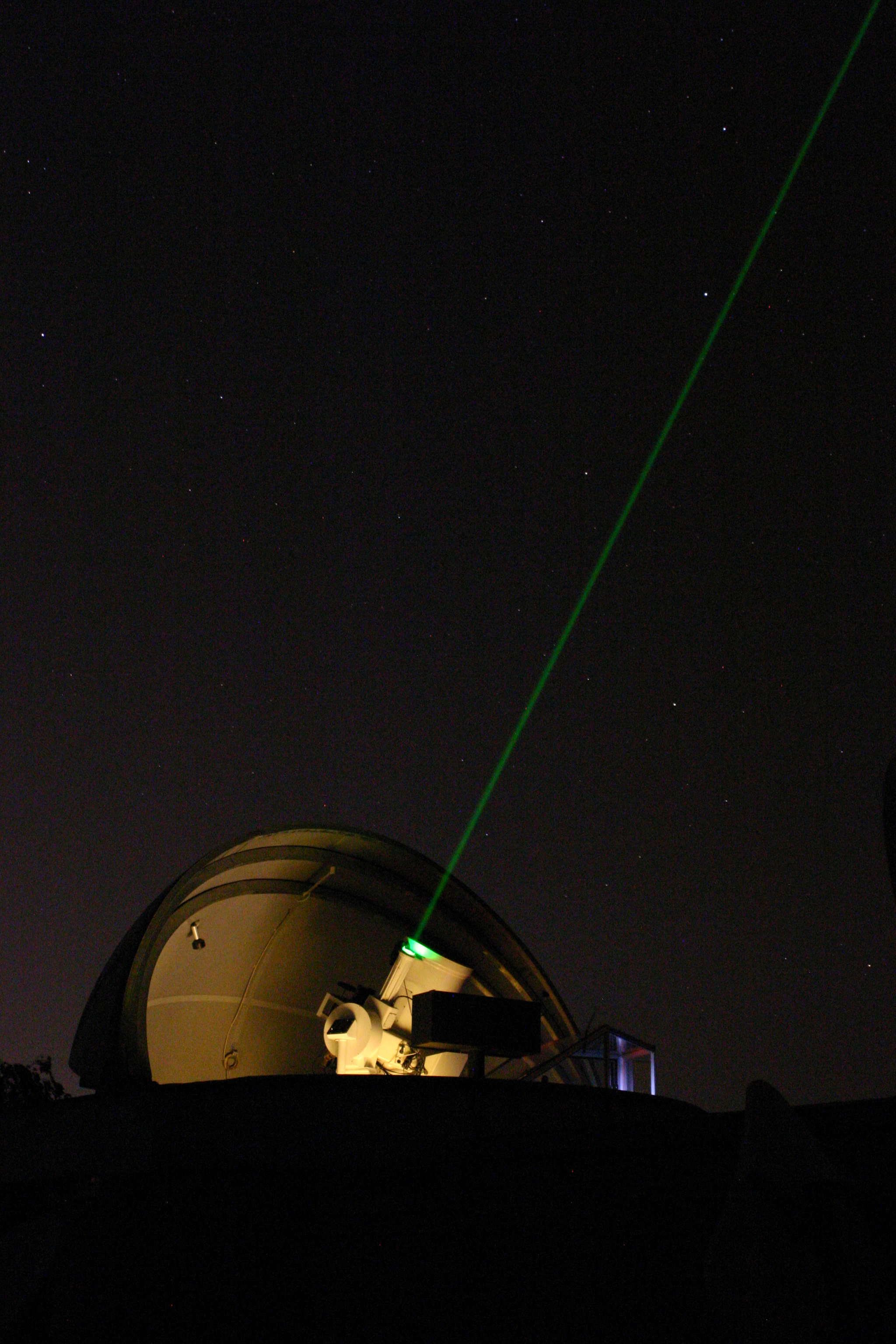
Satellite Laser Tacking at the Lustbühel Observatory near Graz, Austria

Laser ranging to a near-Earth satellite was first carried out by NASA in 1964 with the launch of the Beacon-B satellite. Since that time, ranging precision, spurred by scientific requirements, has improved by a factor of a thousand from a few metres to a few millimetres, and more satellites equipped with retroreflectors have been launched.

Several sets of retroreflectors were installed on Earth's Moon as part of the American Apollo and Soviet Lunokhod space programs. These retroreflectors are also ranged on a regular basis (lunar laser ranging), providing a highly accurate measurement of the dynamics of the Earth/Moon system.

During the subsequent decades, the global satellite laser ranging network has evolved into a powerful source of data for studies of the solid Earth and its ocean and atmospheric systems. In addition, SLR provides precise orbit determination for spaceborne radar altimeter missions mapping the ocean surface (which are used to model global ocean circulation), for mapping volumetric changes in continental ice masses, and for land topography. It provides a means for subnanosecond global time transfer, and a basis for special tests of the Theory of General Relativity.

The International Laser Ranging Service was formed in 1998 by the global SLR community to enhance geophysical and geodetic research activities, replacing the previous CSTG Satellite and Laser Ranging Subcommission.

== Applications ==
SLR data has provided the standard, highly accurate, long wavelength gravity field reference model which supports all precision orbit determination and provides the basis for studying temporal gravitational variations due to mass redistribution. The height of the geoid has been determined to less than ten centimeters at long wavelengths less than 1,500 km.

SLR provides mm/year accurate determinations of tectonic drift station motion on a global scale in a geocentric reference frame. Combined with gravity models and decadal changes in Earth rotation, these results contribute to modeling of convection in the Earth's mantle by providing constraints on related Earth interior processes. The velocity of the fiducial station in Hawaii is 70 mm/year and closely matches the rate of the background geophysical model.

== List of satellites ==
=== List of passive satellites ===
Several dedicated laser ranging satellites were put in orbit:

- Ajisai (Experimental Geodetic Payload)
- BLITS
- Calsphere satellites
- Etalon
  - Kosmos 1989
  - Kosmos 2024
- LAGEOS
  - LAGEOS 1
  - LAGEOS 2, see STS-52
- LARES
  - LARES 1
  - LARES 2
- Larets
- STARSHINE
  - Starshine 1, see STS-96
  - Starshine 2, see STS-108
- Starlette and Stella

=== List of shared satellites ===
Several satellites carried laser retroreflectors, sharing the bus with other instruments:

- Beacon Explorers (Beacon Explorer-B and Beacon Explorer-C)
- GEOS (GEOS-1, GEOS-2, GEOS-3)
- Diadème (satellites)
- PEOLE
- CHAMP
- GRACE
- GOCE
- Navigation satellites
  - GLONASS
  - GPS (two experimental satellites)
  - Galileo
  - BeiDou
  - NavIC
  - QZSS
- Altimeter satellites
  - GEOS-3
  - TOPEX/Poseidon
  - Sentinel-3
  - SARAL

== See also ==
- Lidar
- Lunar laser ranging
- Retroreflector#In satellites
- Laser communication in space
