= Explorer 22 =

NASA satellite of the Explorer program

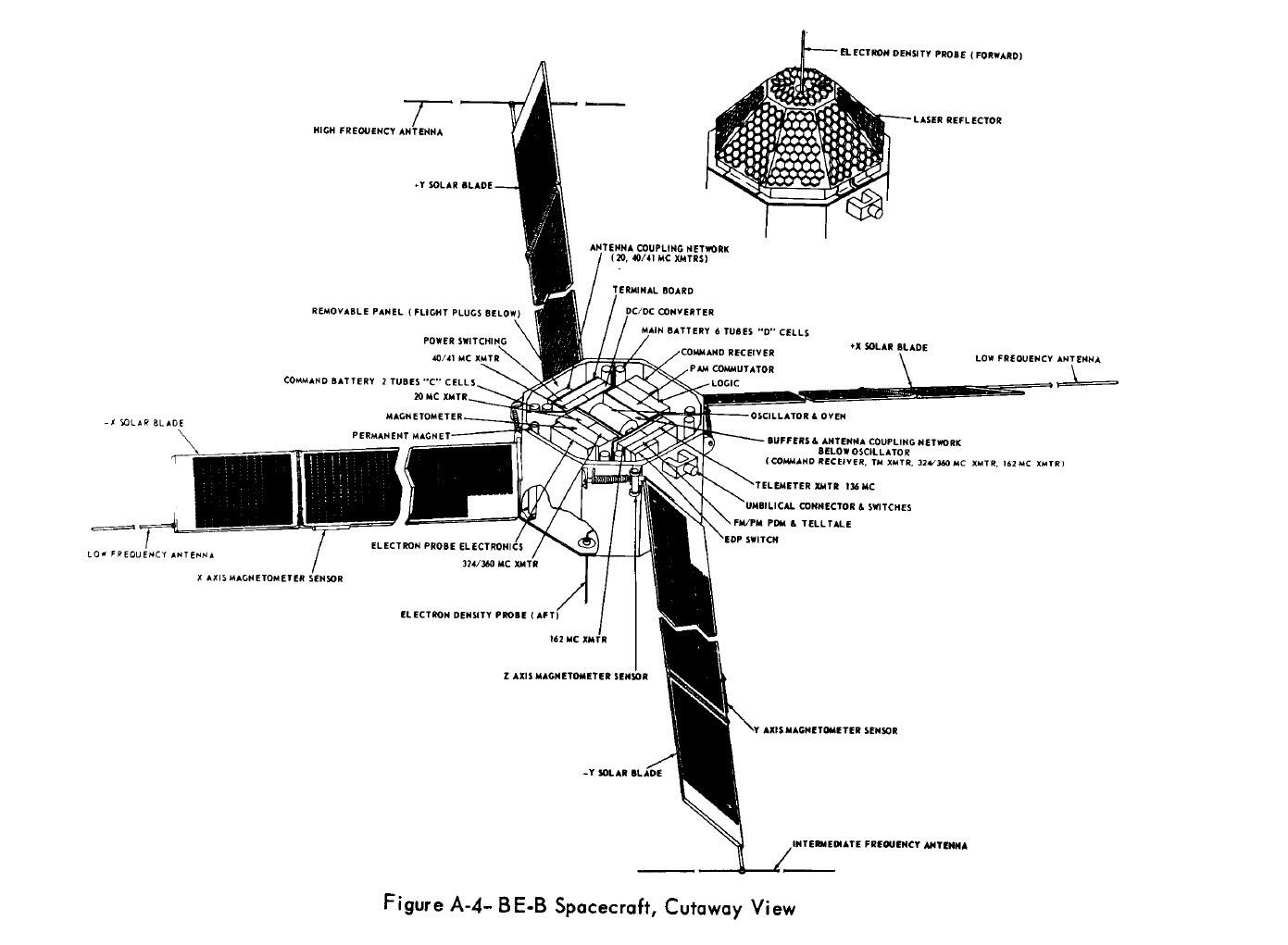
- Cutaway view of the Explorer 22 spacecraft
- Names: BE-B; Beacon Explorer-B; NASA S-66B
- Mission type: Ionospheric research
- Operator: NASA
- COSPAR ID: 1964-064A
- SATCAT no.: 00899
- Mission duration: 5 years, 4 months (achieved)

Spacecraft properties
- Spacecraft: Explorer XXII
- Bus: Beacon Explorer
- Manufacturer: Johns Hopkins University; Applied Physics Laboratory
- Launch mass: 52.6 kg (116 lb)
- Dimensions: 24.5 × 45.7 cm (9.6 × 18.0 in)
- Power: 4 deployable solar arrays and batteries

Start of mission
- Launch date: 10 October 1964, 03:01 GMT
- Rocket: Scout X-4 (S-123R)
- Launch site: Vandenberg, PALC-D
- Contractor: Vought
- Entered service: 10 October 1964

End of mission
- Last contact: February 1970

Orbital parameters
- Reference system: Geocentric orbit
- Regime: Low Earth orbit
- Perigee altitude: 889 km (552 mi)
- Apogee altitude: 1,081 km (672 mi)
- Inclination: 79.70°
- Period: 104.80 minutes

Instruments
- Langmuir Probes; Laser Tracking Reflector; Radio Doppler System; Radio Frequency Beacon

Explorer 22 (known as S-66B pre-launch; also called BE-B or Beacon Explorer-B) was a small NASA ionospheric research satellite launched 9 October 1964, part of NASA's Explorers Program. It was instrumented with an electrostatic probe, four radio beacons for ionospheric research, a passive laser tracking reflector, and two radio beacons for Doppler navigation experiments. Its objective was to provide enhanced geodetic measurements of the Earth as well as data on the total electron content in the Earth's atmosphere and in the satellite's immediate vicinity.

== Spacecraft design ==
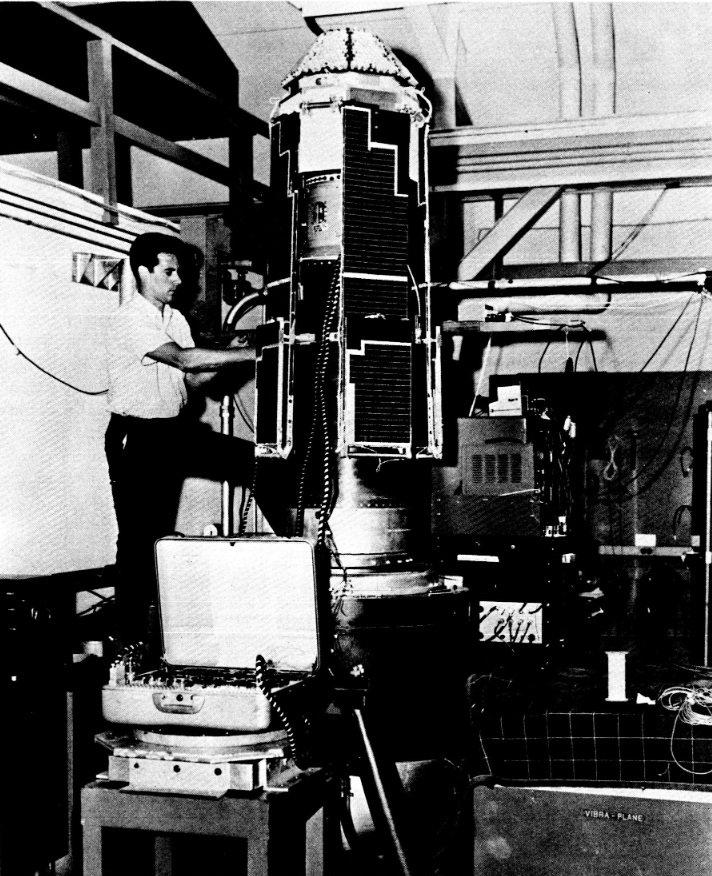
Explorer 22 mounted on vibration table.

Built at the Johns Hopkins University Applied Physics Laboratory, under the direction of Goddard Space Flight Center. Explorer 22 began as "S-66B", the last of the five satellites in NASA's first stage of ionospheric exploration, and the first of five NASA geodetic satellites. Its primary mission was "to conduct ionospheric measurements on a worldwide basis. The program will determine the total electron content of a vertical cross-section of the ionosphere located between the satellite and the earth. Accomplishing this objective will aid in establishing the behavior pattern of the ionosphere as a function of latitude, time of day, season, and solar cycle".

Weighing 52.6 kg (116 lb), the satellite was an octagonal spacecraft with a honeycomb nylon and fiberglass hull, 46 cm (18 in) in diameter, 30 cm (12 in) high, with four solar panels 25 cm (9.8 in) wide and 170 cm (67 in) long.

A three-axis magnetometer and Sun sensors provided information on the satellite's altitude and spin rate. There was no tape recorder aboard so data could be received only when the satellite was within range of a ground telemetry station. Continuous Doppler transmitters operated at 162 and 324 MHz to permit precise tracking by Transit tracking stations for navigation and geodetic studies. Four other transmitters operated on 20, 40, 41, and 360 MHz to measure ionospheric density. Explorer 22's last experiment was an Electron Density Experiment designed for measuring charged particles in the immediate vicinity of the satellite.

Explorer 22 mounted 360 one-inch "cube corner" reflectors made of fused silica, so that the satellite could be tracked via lasers beamed from mobile stations at Wallops Flight Facility (WFF).

The Explorer S-66 had been constructed by March 1963, when a comprehensive series of environmental tests was begun to ensure the satellite could withstand the harsh conditions of space. There were two rounds of tests, occurring March–April and July–August 1963.

== Mission ==
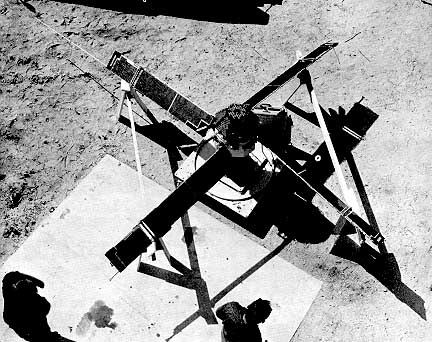
Satellite Explorer 22 (BE-A) during works on the ground.

The first S-66A satellite (Explorer S-66) was scheduled for launch in late 1963. However, due to problems with the Scout X-4, the flight was rescheduled for the following year on a Delta launch vehicle, from Cape Canaveral Launch Complex 17A. On 19 March 1964, the first attempt to this Explorer S-66 ended in failure when the third stage of its Delta launch vehicle burned just 22 seconds instead of the programmed 40 seconds. This was only the second time the Delta launch vehicle had failed, and the incident followed 22 prior successes.

A second S-66 satellite (Explorer 22) was launched, this time successfully, via a Scout X-4 rocket at 03:01 GMT, on 9 October 1964, from the PALC-D launch facility at Vandenberg Air Force Base. Once in space, it became known as Explorer 22. Explorer 22 had a nearly polar orbit, inclined 79.70° to the equator, with an initial apogee of 1,081 km (672 mi) and perigee of 889 km (552 mi), and a period of 104.80minutes. The satellite was initially spin-stabilized, but it was despun after solar paddle erection. About 48 hours later, the satellite's axis of symmetry was oriented with the local magnetic field by means of a strong bar magnet and damping rods.

During the first 48 hours of flight, internal temperatures were at the top of the satellite's tolerance. As a result, the two Doppler transmitters (162 MHz and 324 MHz) were kept off during the periods that the spacecraft was 100% illuminated by the Sun.

== Experiments ==
=== Langmuir Probes ===
Two cylindrical electrostatic probes (types of Langmuir probes) were used to measure electron density and temperature. Each consisted of a collector electrode which extended from the central axis of a cylindrical guard ring. The guard ring extended 12.7 cm (5.0 in) from the spacecraft, and the probe extended 22.86 cm (9.00 in). A 2-Hz sawtooth voltage of -3 to +5 volts was swept alternately to each of the probes, and the resulting current profile to the probe was telemetered. From this profile, the electron density and temperature and mean ion mass could be determined. The experiment was operated for 22-seconds every 3 minutes while within range of any of 10 telemetry stations. This experiment performed nominally from launch until August 1968, when it was turned off.

=== Laser Tracking Reflector ===
The passive optical laser experiment, which consisted of nine panels on the spacecraft, was used to determine the spacecraft range and angle. Each panel was covered with 40 quartz cube-corner prisms that provided laser tracking capabilities for optical tracking studies. The ground-based optical transmitter was a pulsed 1-microsecond ruby laser. A photo detector determined whether the laser beam interrupted the spacecraft. The experiment operated as planned.

=== Radio Doppler System ===
Two coherent, unmodulated CW transmitters, operating on frequencies of 162 and 324 MHz, allowed the Tranet Doppler Network to obtain data for studies of dynamic geodesy. The frequencies were generated from redundant, dual, ultra-stable crystal oscillators operating on a frequency of 3 MHz minus 80 ppm. The system operated as planned.

=== Radio Frequency Beacon ===
A radio beacon radiated a plane-polarized signal at 20.005 MHz, 40.010 MHz, 41.010 MHz, and 360.090 MHz, all harmonics of 1.00025 MHz. The three lower frequencies underwent an appreciable number of rotations about the plane of polarization due to electron concentration. The highest frequency did not. Several methods were used to analyze these rotations and determine the total electron content between the satellite and a ground receiver. The instrument failed in January 1970.

== Mission results ==
Explorer 22 involved the largest international participation to date in a NASA mission: some 50 scientific groups in 32 countries ran more than 80 ground tracking stations. Satellite laser ranging (SLR) began shortly after the satellite's magnetic stabilization, during the satellite's daily flyovers. This allowed highly accurate measurements of Explorer 22's orbit, making it possible for the irregularities of the Earth's shape and density to be more accurately mapped.

In August 1968, data acquisition from the Explorer 22's telemetry channels was discontinued. In July 1969, tracking and world map production were discontinued by Goddard Space Flight Center, and world map production based on NORAD orbit elements was subsequently assumed by European Space Research Organisation (ESRO). The satellite failed in February 1970 and Explorer 22's successor, Explorer 27, was turned on in order to continue the satellite's beacon experiment.

== See also ==
- Explorer 27
- Explorer Program
