= Michael A. Baker =

American astronaut (born 1953)

Michael Baker
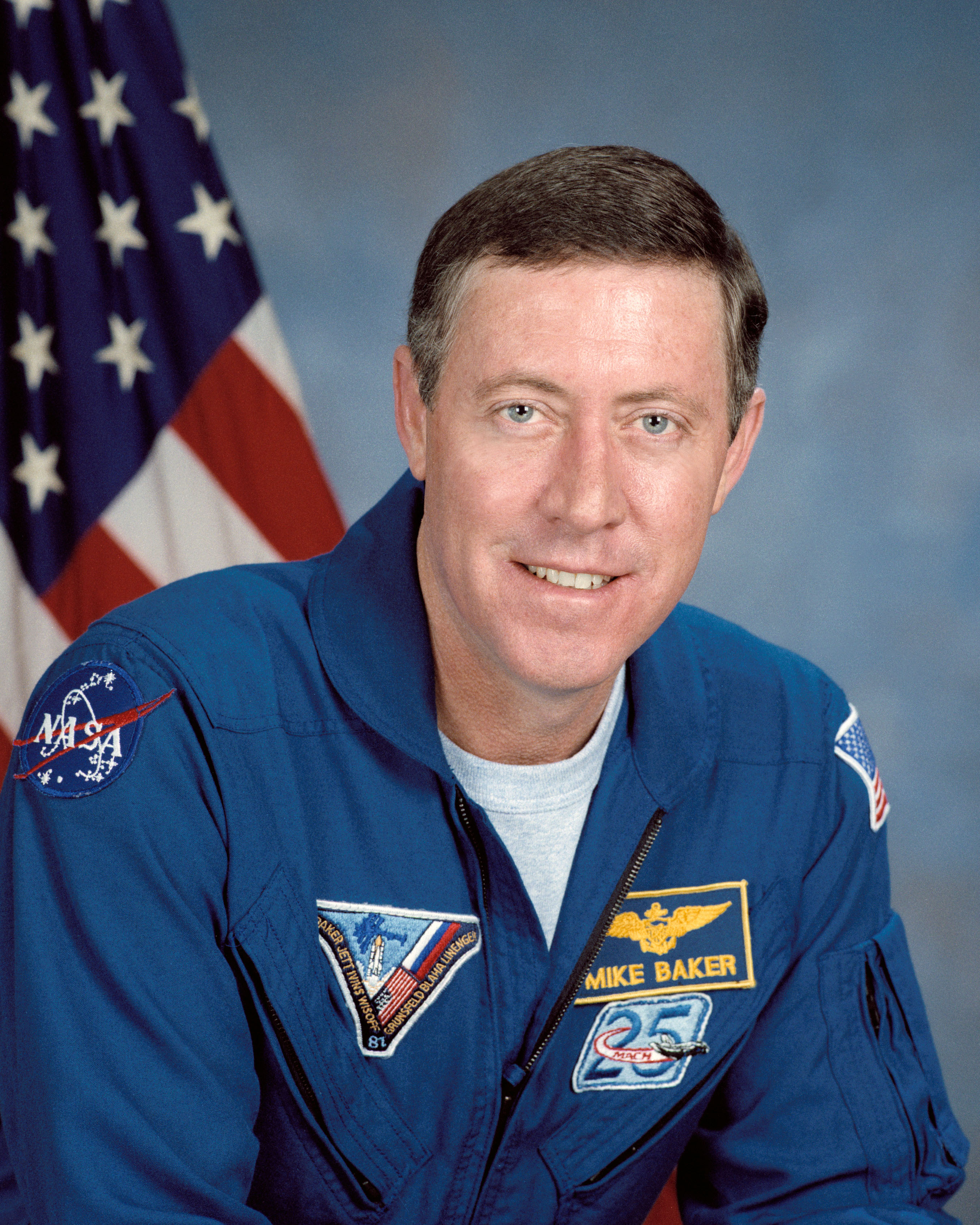
- Born: Michael Allen Baker; October 27, 1953 (age 73); Memphis, Tennessee, U.S.
- Education: University of Texas, Austin (BS)
- Awards: Distinguished Flying Cross; NASA Distinguished Service Medal
- Space career

NASA astronaut
- Rank: Captain, USN
- Time in space: 40d 4h 59m
- Selection: NASA Group 11 (1985)
- Mission: STS-43; STS-52; STS-68; STS-81
- Retired: January 7, 2017

Michael Allen Baker (born October 27, 1953) is a retired captain in the United States Navy, former NASA astronaut, and the International Space Station Program Manager for International and Crew Operations, at NASA's Johnson Space Center. He is responsible for the coordination of program operations, integration and flight crew training and support activities with the International Partners.

== Early life ==
Baker was born on October 27, 1953, in Memphis, Tennessee, and considers Lemoore, California to be his hometown. He was active in the Boy Scouts of America where he achieved its second highest rank, Life Scout. Baker graduated from Lemoore Union High School, Lemoore, California, in 1971, and received a Bachelor of Science degree in Aerospace Engineering from the University of Texas in 1975, where he was a member of the Tejas Club. He has two children.

== Naval service ==
After graduation, Baker completed flight training and earned his Wings of Gold as a Naval Aviator at Naval Air Station Chase Field, Beeville, Texas, in 1977. In 1978, he was assigned to Attack Squadron 56 (VA-56), embarked on the aircraft carrier USS Midway, homeported in Yokosuka, Japan, where he flew the A-7 Corsair II. In late 1980, he was assigned to Carrier Air Wing 30 as the Air Wing Landing Signal Officer.

He attended the U.S. Naval Test Pilot School in 1981 and, after graduation, was assigned to the Carrier Suitability Branch of the Strike Aircraft Test Directorate. While there, Baker conducted carrier suitability structural tests, aircraft carrier catapult and arresting gear certification tests, and automatic carrier landing system certification and verification tests on the various aircraft carriers of the Navy's fleet in the A-7 Corsair II aircraft.

In 1983, he returned to the U.S. Naval Test Pilot School as an instructor. He was then assigned as the U.S. Navy exchange instructor at the Empire Test Pilots' School in Boscombe Down, England, teaching performance, flying qualities and systems flight test techniques.

He has logged over 5,400 hours flying time in approximately 50 different types of airplanes, including tactical jets, VSTOL, multi-engine transport and rotary wing aircraft, and has over 300 carrier landings to his credit.

== NASA ==
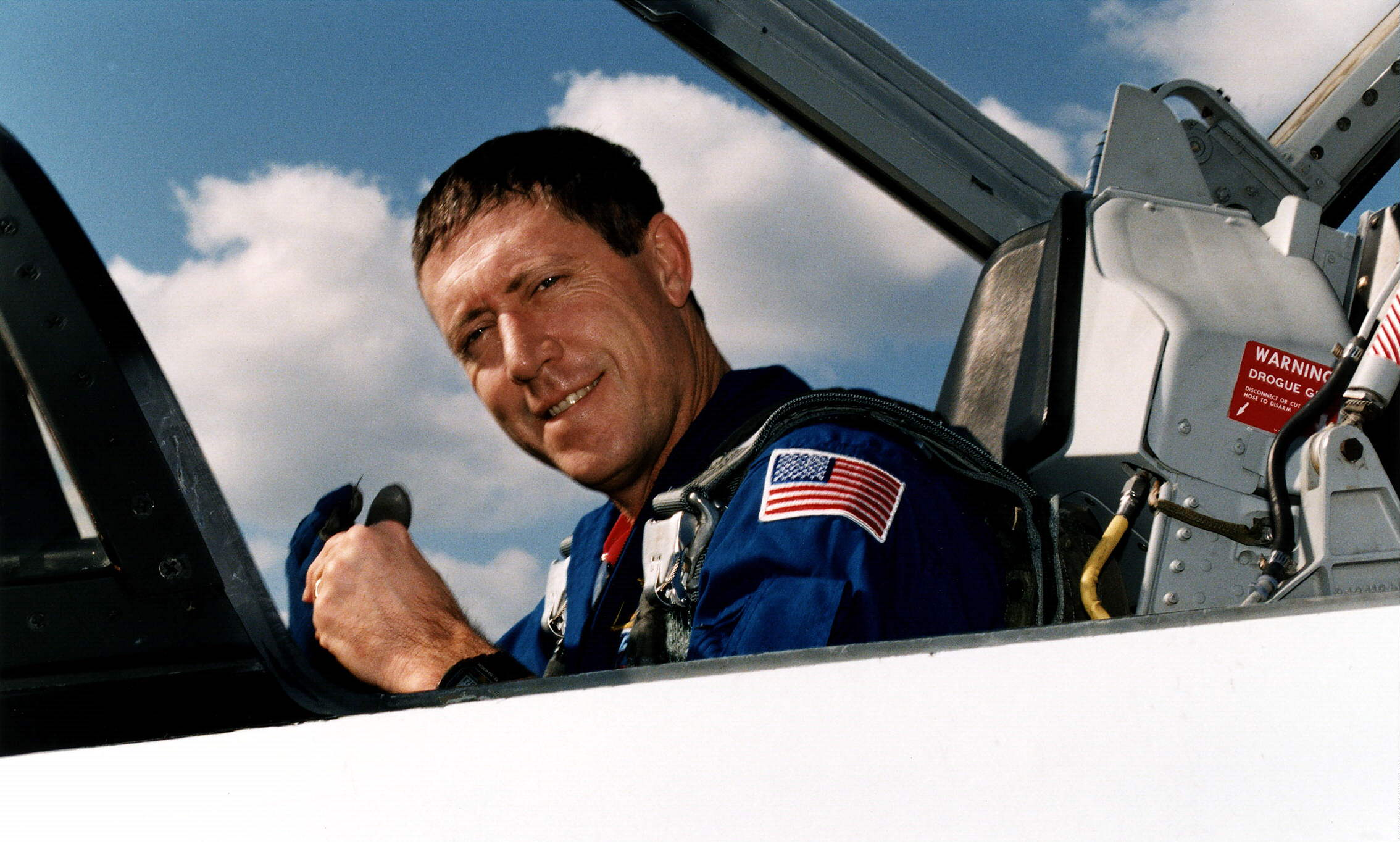
Baker in a NASA T-38 jet

Selected by NASA in June 1985, Baker became an astronaut in July 1986 upon completion of a one-year training and evaluation program.

Following the Challenger accident, Baker was assigned from January 1986 to December 1987 as a member of the team that was pursuing redesign, modification and improvements to the Shuttle Landing and Deceleration Systems, to include nosewheel steering, brakes, tires, and drag chute, in an effort to provide greater safety margins during landing and rollout. He was then assigned to the Shuttle Avionics Integration Laboratory, where he was involved in the checkout and verification of the computer software and hardware interfaces for STS-26 (the return-to-flight mission) and subsequent flights.

Baker then served as an ascent, entry and orbit spacecraft communicator (CAPCOM) for Shuttle missions STS-27, STS-29, STS-30, STS-28, STS-34, STS-33, STS-32, STS-36, STS-31, STS-38, and STS-35. His duties included communication with the Shuttle crew during simulations and actual missions, as well as working procedural problems and modifications between missions. He served as the leader of the Astronaut Support Personnel team at the Kennedy Space Center for Shuttle missions STS-44, STS-42 and STS-45. He was assigned as the Flight Crew Operations Directorate Representative to the Space Shuttle Program Office from December 1992 to January 1994.

Between March and October 1995, he served as the Director of Operations for NASA at the Gagarin Cosmonaut Training Center in Star City, Russia. He was responsible for the coordination and implementation of mission operation activities in the Moscow region for the joint U.S./Russian Shuttle/Mir program. From October 1997 to August 2001, he was the assistant director of Johnson Space Center (JSC) for Human Space Flight Programs, Russia and was responsible for implementation and integration of NASA's Human Space Flight Programs in Russia. Those activities included International Space Station (ISS) training, operations, technical liaison, logistics and personnel administration support. He also served as the NASA JSC representative to the Russian Space Agency, Gagarin Cosmonaut Training Center, Star City; Mission Control Center-Moscow, Energia Rocket and Spacecraft Corporation, Krunichev State Scientific and Production Space Center and other Russian government agencies and manufacturers involved in the ISS program. After his return to JSC in August 2001, he was assigned as the International Space Station Program Manager for International Operations responsible for the coordination of program operations, integration and flight crew training and support activities with the International Partners.

=== Space flights ===
A veteran of four space flights, Baker has logged 965 hours in space. He served as pilot on STS-43 (August 2–11, 1991) and STS-52 (October 22 to November 1, 1992), and was the mission commander on STS-68 (September 30 to October 11, 1994) and STS-81 (January 12–22, 1997).

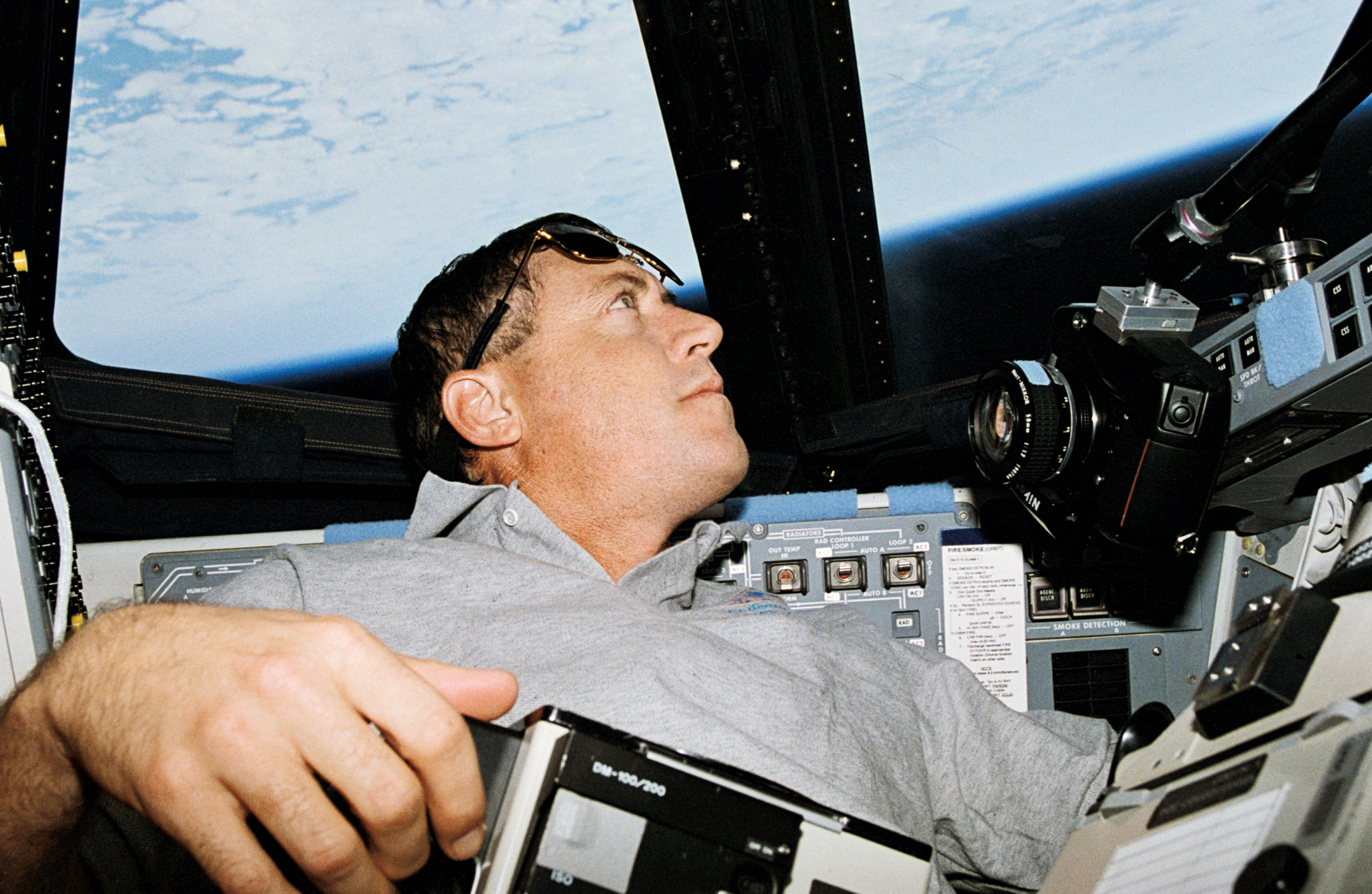
Baker looking at the Earth during STS-68

STS-43 Space Shuttle Atlantis launched from the Kennedy Space Center, Florida, on August 2, 1991. During the flight, crew members deployed the fifth Tracking and Data Relay Satellite (TDRS-E), in addition to conducting 32 physical, material, and life science experiments, mostly relating to the Extended Duration Orbiter and Space Station Freedom. After 142 orbits of the Earth, the 9-day mission concluded with a landing on Runway 15 at the Kennedy Space Center on August 11, 1991. Mission duration was 213 hours, 21 minutes, 25 seconds.

STS-52 Space Shuttle Columbia launched from the Kennedy Space Center, Florida, on October 22, 1992. During the mission crew members deployed the Italian Laser Geodynamic Satellite (LAGEOS), used to measure movement of the Earth's crust, and operated the U.S. Microgravity Payload 1 (USMP-1). Additionally, the Advanced Space Vision System (SVS) developed by the Canadian Space Agency was tested by the Canadian payload specialist and the crew using a small target assembly that was released from the remote manipulator system. The SVS will be used for Space Station construction. These three primary payloads together with numerous other payloads operated by the crew encompassed geophysics, materials science, biological research and applied research for Space Station Freedom. Following 159 orbits of the Earth, the 10-day mission concluded with a landing on Runway 33 at the Kennedy Space Center on November 1, 1992. Mission duration was 236 hours, 56 minutes, 13 seconds.

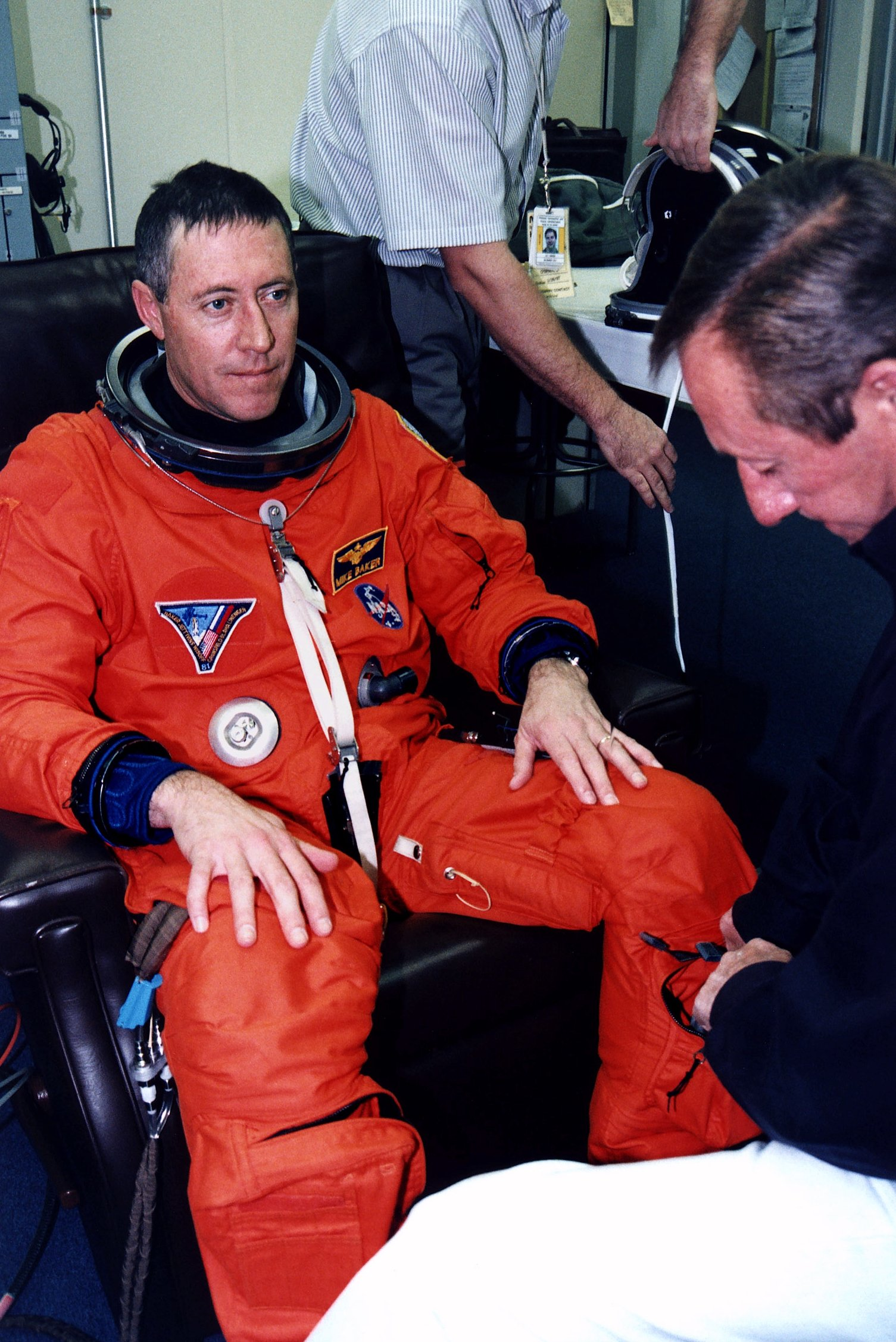
Baker suiting up prior to launch of STS-81

STS-68 Space Shuttle Endeavour launched from the Kennedy Space Center, Florida, on September 30, 1994. This flight was the second flight of the Space Radar Laboratory (SRL), which consists of a large radar called SIR-C/X-SAR (Shuttle Imaging Radar-C/X-Band Synthetic Aperture Radar) and MAPS (Measurement of Air Pollution from Satellites). As part of NASA's Mission to Planet Earth, SRL was an international, multidisciplinary study of global environmental change, both natural and man-made. The primary objective was to radar map the surface of the Earth to help us understand the contributions of ecology, hydrology, geology, and oceanography to changes in our Planet's environment. Real-time crew observations of environmental conditions, along with over 14,000 photographs, aided in interpretation of the radar images. This SRL mission was a highly successful test of technology intended for long-term environmental and geological monitoring of planet Earth. Following 183 orbits of the Earth, the eleven-day mission concluded with a landing on Runway 22 at Edwards Air Force Base, California, on October 11, 1994. Mission duration was 269 hours, 46 minutes, 10 seconds.

STS-81 Space Shuttle Atlantis launched from the Kennedy Space Center, Florida on January 12, 1997. STS-81 was the fifth in a series of joint missions between the U.S. Space Shuttle and the Russian Space Station Mir and the second one involving an exchange of U.S. astronauts. In five days of docked operations more than three tons of food, water, experiment equipment and samples were moved back and forth between the two spacecraft. Following 160 orbits of the Earth the STS-81 mission concluded with a landing on Kennedy Space Center's Runway 33 ending a 3.9 million mile journey. Mission duration was 244 hours, 56 minutes.

== Post NASA ==
In January 2017, Baker left NASA to work for the private industry. He currently resides in League City, Texas.

== Honors ==
- Defense Superior Service Medal
- Legion of Merit
- Distinguished Flying Cross
- 2 Defense Meritorious Service Medals
- National Defense Service Medal
- 3 Navy Expeditionary Medals
- the Navy Unit Commendation
- 3 Meritorious Unit Commendations
- the Battle "E" Award
- NASA Distinguished Service Medal
- NASA Outstanding Leadership Medal
- NASA Exceptional Service Medal
- 4 NASA Space Flight Medals
- 2 Sea Service Awards
- the Overseas Service Award
- Named 1993 Outstanding University of Texas Alumnus

== Organizations ==
- Member of the Society of Experimental Test Pilots
- Association of Naval Aviation
- the Tailhook Association
- Association of Space Explorers
- National Aeronautic Association
- Sierra Club
- Veterans of Foreign Wars
- Member of the Advisory Committee to the University of Texas College of Engineering, Aerospace Engineering Department.
- Member of the Tejas Club
