= LAGEOS =

NASA scientific research satellites

LAGEOS-1
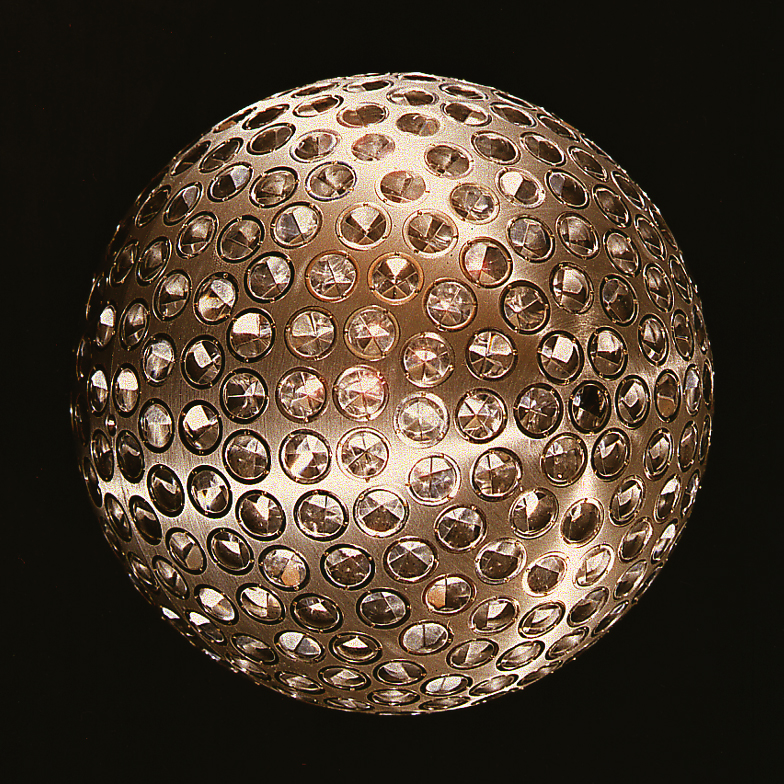
- LAGEOS-1 (diameter=60 cm [23.6 inches])
- Mission type: Geodesy
- COSPAR ID: 1976-039A
- SATCAT no.: 8820
- Website: ilrs.cddis.eosdis.nasa.gov
- Mission duration: 50 years, 3 months and 18 days (in progress)

Spacecraft properties
- Spacecraft type: GEOS
- Manufacturer: NASA
- Launch mass: 406.965 kilograms (897.20 lb)
- Dimensions: 0.60 metres (2 ft 0 in) diameter sphere

Start of mission
- Launch date: 4 May 1976, 08:00 UTC
- Rocket: Delta 2913 / Star-24
- Launch site: Vandenberg SLC-2W
- Contractor: NASA

End of mission
- Disposal: Re-Entry
- Decay date: in 8 Million Years

Orbital parameters
- Reference system: Geocentric
- Regime: Medium Earth
- Semi-major axis: 12,271.15 kilometers (7,624.94 mi)
- Eccentricity: 0.0044560
- Perigee altitude: 5,838.33 kilometers (3,627.77 mi)
- Apogee altitude: 5,947.69 kilometers (3,695.72 mi)
- Inclination: 109.83 degrees
- Period: 225.70 minutes
- Epoch: 5 May 2017, 07:05:23 UTC

Instruments
- 422 glass retroreflectors; 4 germanium infrared retroreflectors; Time capsule plaque

LAGEOS-2
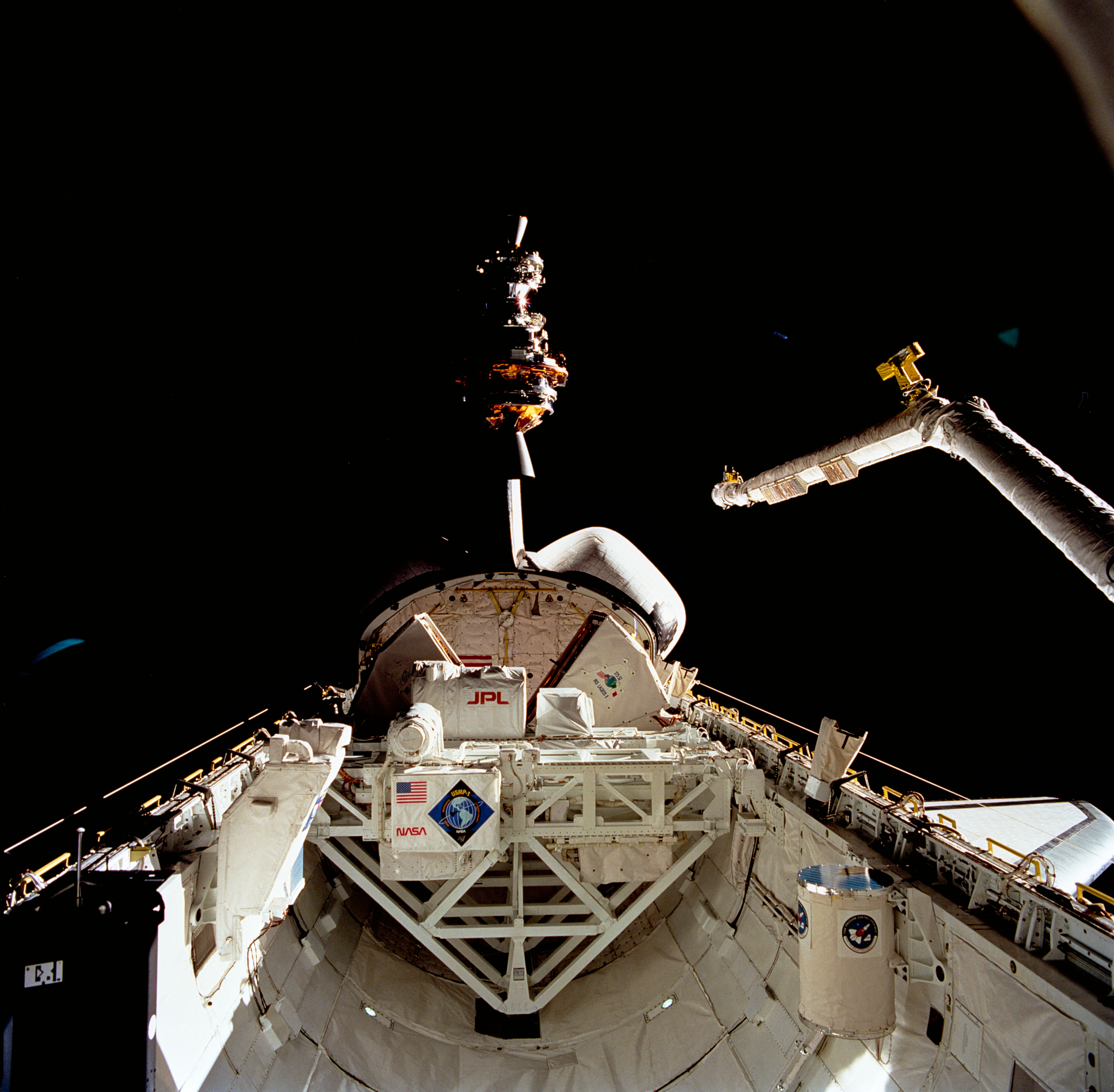
- LAGEOS 2 during deployment on STS-52
- Mission type: Geodesy
- Operator: NASA
- COSPAR ID: 1992-070B
- SATCAT no.: 22195
- Website: ilrs.cddis.eosdis.nasa.gov
- Mission duration: 33 years and 10 months (in progress)

Spacecraft properties
- Spacecraft type: LAGEOS
- Manufacturer: Aeritalia for the Italian Space Agency (ASI)
- Launch mass: 405.38 kilograms (893.7 lb)
- Dimensions: 0.60 metres (2 ft 0 in) diameter sphere

Start of mission
- Launch date: 22 October 1992, 17:09 UTC
- Rocket: Space Shuttle STS-52 / Italian Research Interim Stage (IRIS)
- Launch site: Kennedy LC-39B

End of mission
- Disposal: Re-Entry
- Decay date: in 8 Million years

Orbital parameters
- Reference system: Geocentric
- Regime: Medium Earth
- Semi-major axis: 12,161.84 kilometers (7,557.02 mi)
- Eccentricity: 0.0137298
- Perigee altitude: 5,616.73 kilometers (3,490.07 mi)
- Apogee altitude: 5,950.68 kilometers (3,697.58 mi)
- Inclination: 52.65 degrees
- Period: 222.46 minutes
- Epoch: 5 May 2017, 07:48:20 UTC

Instruments
- 422 glass retroreflectors; 4 germanium infrared retroreflectors

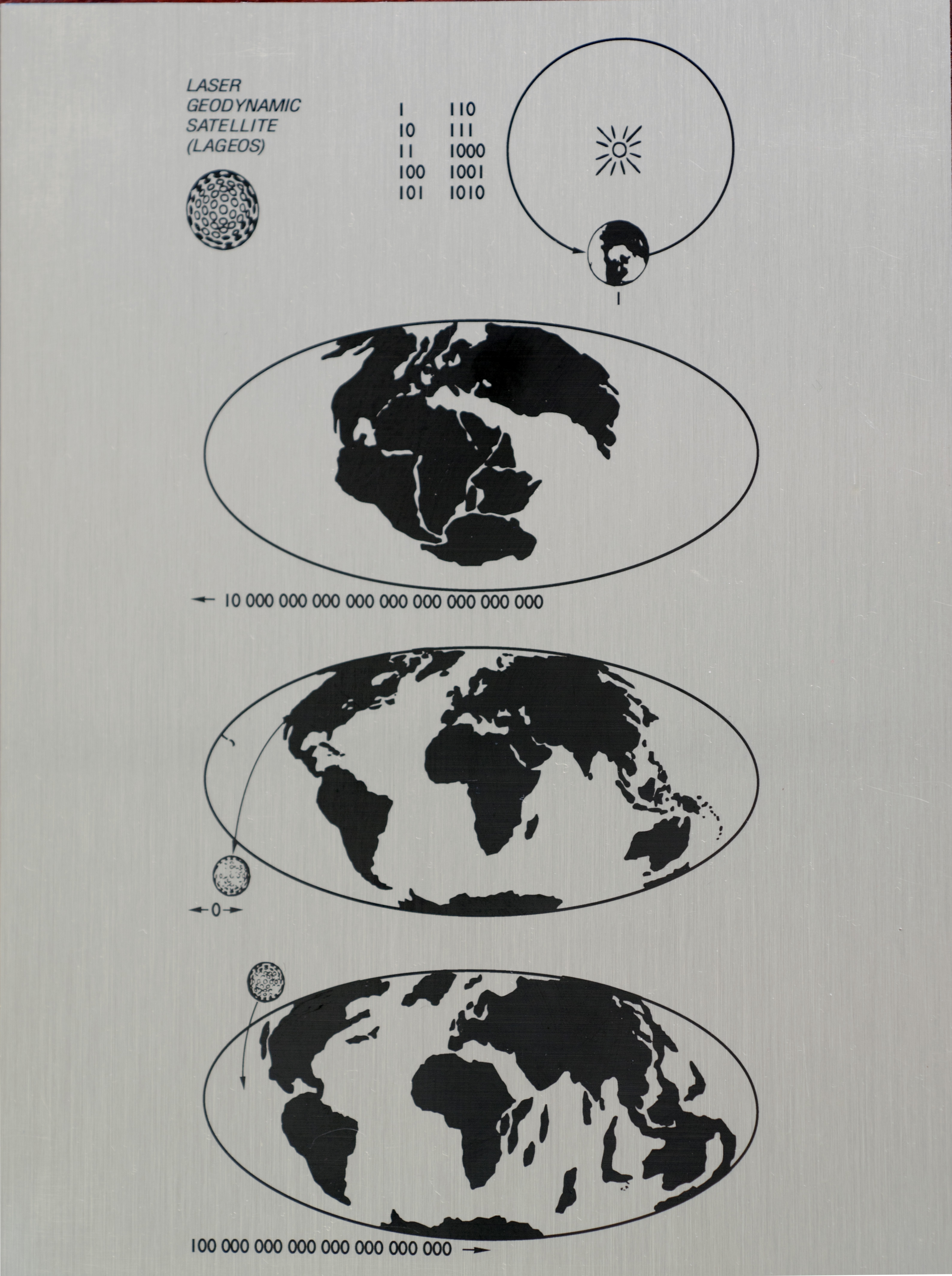
The LAGEOS plaque, designed by Carl Sagan

LAGEOS (/leɪʒiːoʊs/), Laser Geodynamics Satellite or Laser Geometric Environmental Observation Survey, are a series of two scientific research satellites designed to provide an orbiting laser ranging benchmark for geodynamical studies of the Earth. Each satellite is a high-density passive laser reflector in a very stable medium Earth orbit (MEO).

== Function and operation ==
The spacecraft are aluminum-covered brass spheres with diameters of 60 centimetres (24 in) and masses of 400 and 411 kilograms (882 and 906 pounds), covered with 426 cube-corner retroreflectors, giving them the appearance of disco balls. Of these retroreflectors, 422 are made from fused silica glass while the remaining 4 are made from germanium to obtain measurements in the infrared for experimental studies of reflectivity and satellite orientation. They have no on-board sensors or electronics, and are not attitude-controlled.

They orbit at an altitude of 5,900 kilometres (3,700 mi), well above low Earth orbit and well below geostationary orbit, at orbital inclinations of 109.8 and 52.6 degrees.

Measurements are made by transmitting pulsed laser beams from Earth ground stations to the satellites. The laser beams then return to Earth after hitting the reflecting surfaces; the travel times are precisely measured, permitting ground stations in different parts of the Earth to measure their separations to better than one inch in thousands of miles.

The LAGEOS satellites make it possible to determine positions of points on the Earth with extremely high accuracy due to the stability of their orbits. The high mass-to-area ratio and the precise, stable (attitude-independent) geometry of the LAGEOS spacecraft, together with their extremely regular orbits, make these satellites the most precise position references available.

== Mission goals ==
The LAGEOS mission consists of the following key goals:

- Provide an accurate measurement of the satellite's position with respect to Earth.
- Determine the planet's shape (geoid).
- Determine tectonic plate movements associated with continental drift.

Ground tracking stations located in many countries (including the US, Mexico, France, Germany, Poland, Australia, Egypt, China, Peru, Italy, and Japan) have ranged to the satellites and data from these stations are available worldwide to investigators studying crustal dynamics.

There are two LAGEOS spacecraft, LAGEOS-1 launched in 1976, and LAGEOS-2 launched in 1992. As of 2024, both LAGEOS spacecraft are routinely tracked by the ILRS network.

== Time capsule ==
LAGEOS-1 (which is predicted to re-enter the atmosphere in 8.4 million years) also contains a 4 in × 7 in plaque designed by Carl Sagan to indicate to future humanity when LAGEOS-1 was launched. The plaque includes the numbers 1 to 10 in binary. In the upper right is a diagram of the Earth orbiting the Sun, with a binary number 1 indicating one revolution, equaling one year. It then shows 268,435,456 years in the past (binary: 2^{28}), indicated by a left arrow and the arrangement of the Earth's continents at that time (during the Permian period). The present arrangement of the Earth's continents is indicated with a 0 and both forward and backward arrows. Then the estimated arrangement of the continents in 8.4 million years with a right facing arrow and 8,388,608 in binary (2^{23}). LAGEOS itself is shown at launch on the 0 year, and falling to the Earth in the 8.4 million year diagram.

== Launch data ==
- LAGEOS 1, launched 4 May 1976, NSSDC ID 1976-039A, NORAD number 8820
- LAGEOS 2, deployed 23 October 1992 from STS-52, NSSDC ID 1992-070B, NORAD number 22195

== See also ==
- GEOS-3
- PAGEOS
- Geodesy
- Post-glacial rebound
- List of laser articles
- List of laser ranging satellites
- LARES (satellite) a similar object made of mostly tungsten
