= STS-81 =

1997 American crewed spaceflight to Mir

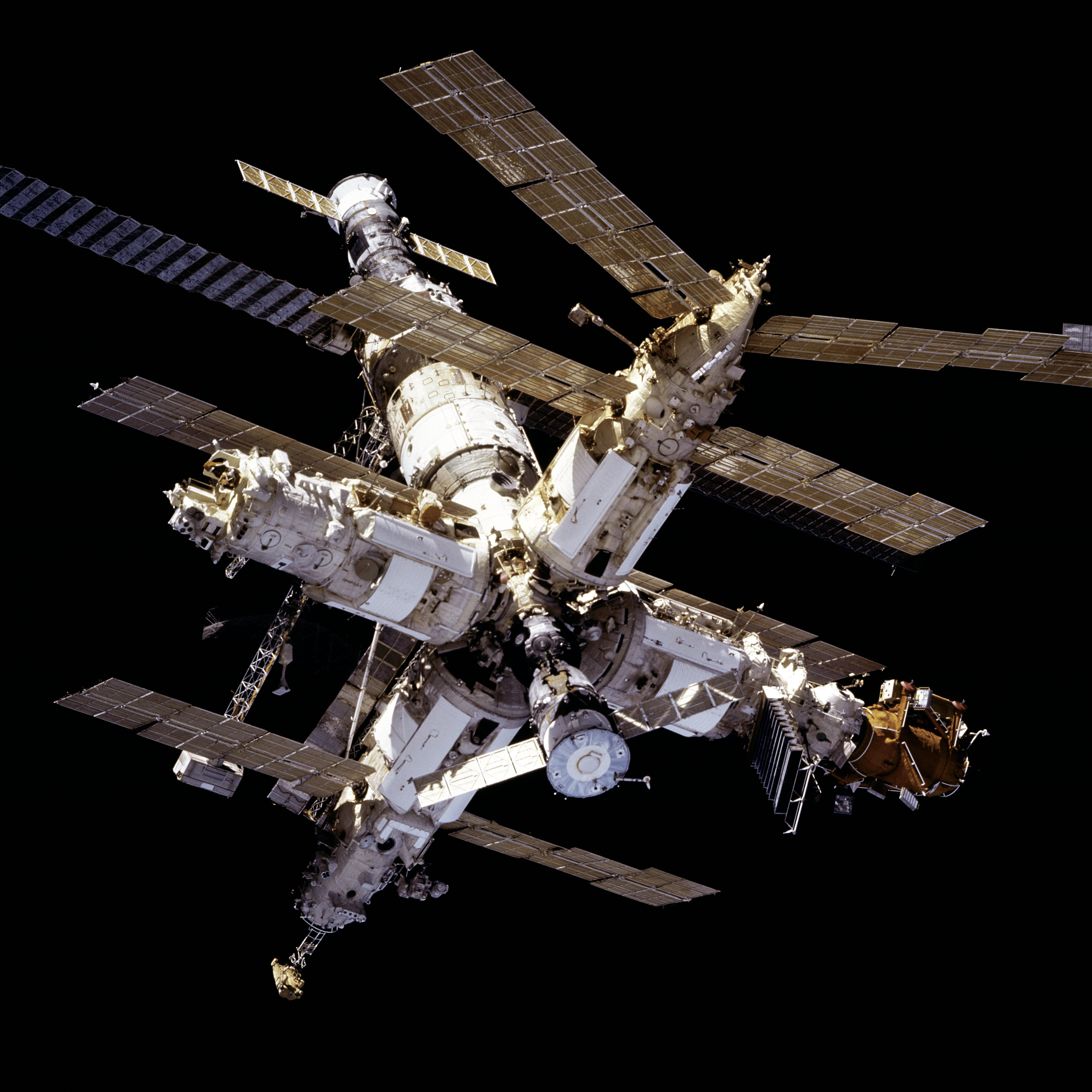
- View of Mir from Atlantis, with the Soyuz-TM Fregat and Progress 233 docked
- Names: Space Transportation System-81
- Mission type: Shuttle-Mir
- Operator: NASA
- COSPAR ID: 1997-001A
- SATCAT no.: 24711
- Mission duration: 10 days, 4 hours, 56 minutes, 30 seconds
- Distance travelled: 6,100,000 kilometres (3,800,000 mi)
- Orbits completed: 160

Spacecraft properties
- Spacecraft: Space Shuttle Atlantis
- Payload mass: 2,250 kilograms (4,960 lb)

Crew
- Crew size: 6
- Members: Michael A. Baker; Brent W. Jett Jr.; Peter J. K. Wisoff; John M. Grunsfeld; Marsha Ivins
- Launching: Jerry M. Linenger
- Landing: John E. Blaha

Start of mission
- Launch date: January 12, 1997, 09:27:23 UTC
- Launch site: Kennedy, LC-39B

End of mission
- Landing date: January 22, 1997, 14:23:51 UTC
- Landing site: Kennedy, SLF Runway 33

Orbital parameters
- Reference system: Geocentric
- Regime: Low Earth
- Perigee altitude: 380 kilometres (240 mi)
- Apogee altitude: 392 kilometres (244 mi)
- Inclination: 51.6 degrees
- Period: 92.2 min

Docking with Mir
- Docking port: SO starboard
- Docking date: January 15, 1997, 03:54:49 UTC
- Undocking date: January 20, 1997, 02:15:44 UTC
- Time docked: 4 days, 22 hours, 20 minutes 55 seconds
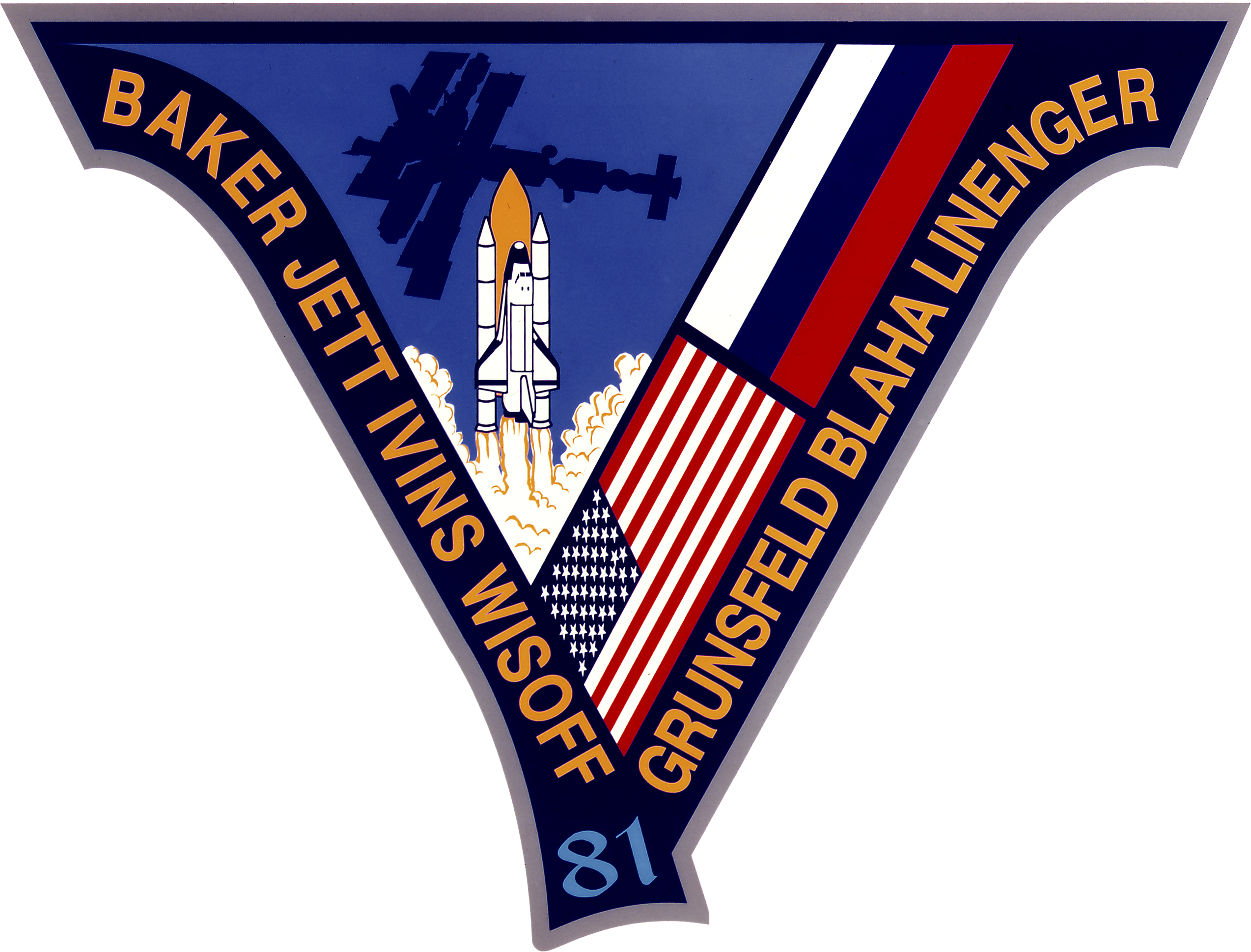
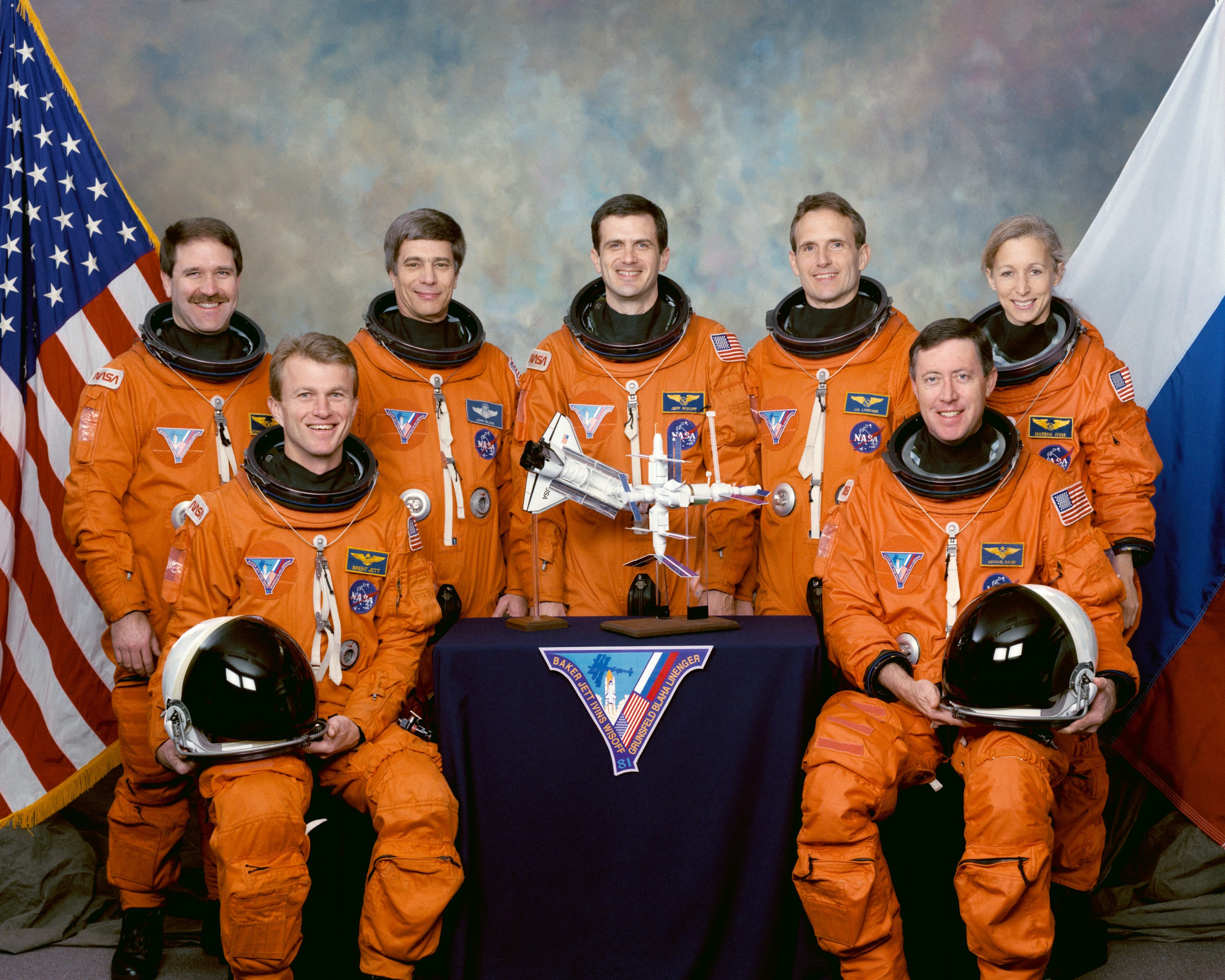
- Left to right - Front: Jett, Baker; Back: Grunsfeld, Blaha, Wisoff, Linenger, Ivins Space Shuttle program

STS-81 was a January 1997 Space Shuttle Atlantis mission to the Mir space station.

== Crew ==
Position	Launching Astronaut	Landing Astronaut
Commander	Michael A. Baker; Fourth and last spaceflight	
Pilot	Brent W. Jett Jr. Second spaceflight	
Mission Specialist 1	Peter J. K. Wisoff; Third spaceflight	
Mission Specialist 2 Flight Engineer	John M. Grunsfeld; Second spaceflight	
Mission Specialist 3	Marsha Ivins; Fourth spaceflight	
Mission Specialist 4	Jerry M. Linenger; EO-22; Second and last spaceflight	John E. Blaha; EO-22; Fifth and last spaceflight

=== Crew seat assignments ===
Seat	Launch	Landing	Seats 1–4 are on the flight deck. Seats 5–7 are on the mid-deck.
1	Baker		Seats 1–4 are on the flight deck. Seats 5–7 are on the mid-deck.
2	Jett		Seats 1–4 are on the flight deck. Seats 5–7 are on the mid-deck.
3	Wisoff	Ivins	Seats 1–4 are on the flight deck. Seats 5–7 are on the mid-deck.
4	Grunsfeld		Seats 1–4 are on the flight deck. Seats 5–7 are on the mid-deck.
5	Ivins	Wisoff	Seats 1–4 are on the flight deck. Seats 5–7 are on the mid-deck.
6	Linenger	Blaha	Seats 1–4 are on the flight deck. Seats 5–7 are on the mid-deck.
7	Unused		Seats 1–4 are on the flight deck. Seats 5–7 are on the mid-deck.

== Mission highlights ==
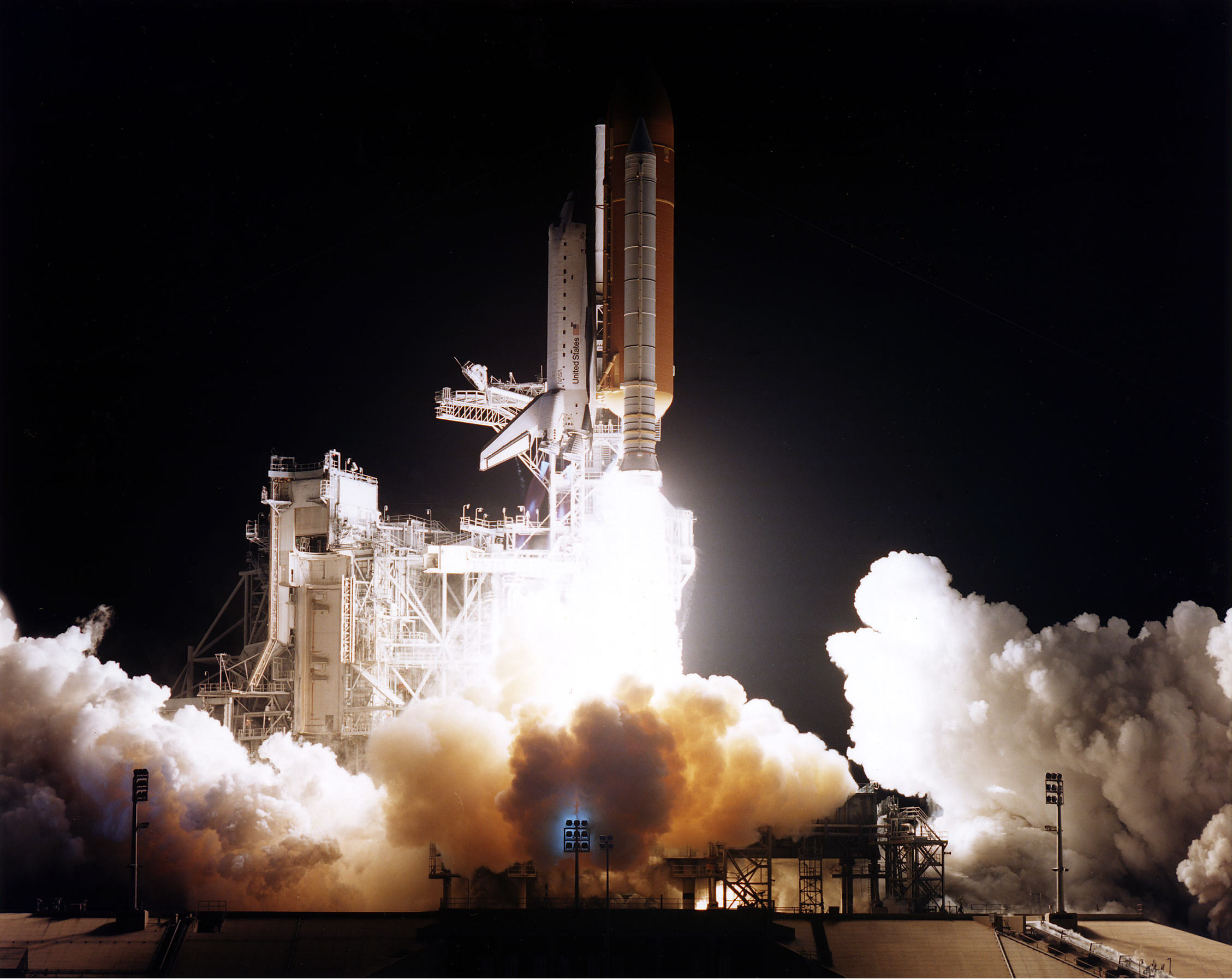
Atlantis launches at the beginning of the STS-81 mission to the Mir Space Station.

STS-81 was the fifth of nine planned missions to Mir and the second one involving an exchange of U.S. astronauts. Astronaut John Blaha, who had been on Mir since September 19, 1996, was replaced by astronaut Jerry Linenger. Linenger spent more than four months on Mir. He returned to Earth on Space Shuttle Mission STS-84.

Atlantis carried the SPACEHAB double module providing additional middeck locker space for secondary experiments. During the five days of docked operations with Mir, the crews transferred water and supplies from one spacecraft to the other. A spacewalk by Linenger and one of his Russian cosmonaut crewmates occurred after the departure of Atlantis.

The STS-81 mission included several experiments in the fields of advanced technology, Earth sciences, fundamental biology, human life sciences, microgravity, and space sciences. It was hoped that data would supply insight for the planning and development of the International Space Station, Earth-based sciences of human and biological processes, and the advancement of commercial technology.

On January 18, while Atlantis was docked to Mir, Grunsfeld placed a telephone call to the NPR show Car Talk, hosted by two of Grunsfeld's fellow MIT alumni, Tom and Ray Magliozzi.

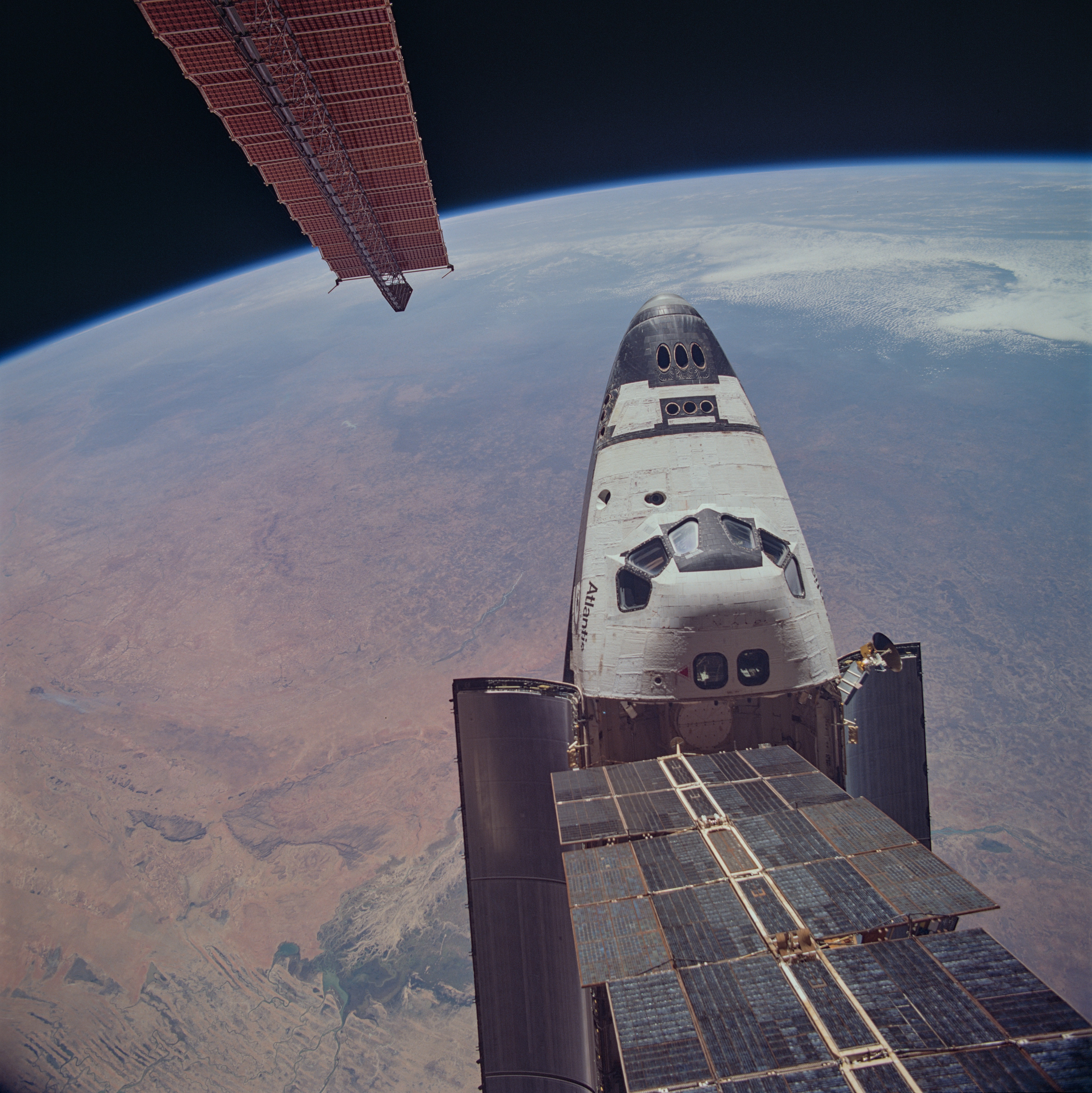
Atlantis docked to the Mir space station, over Saharan Africa

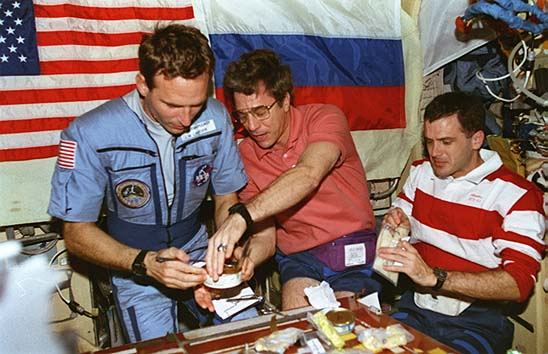
Mission Specialists Jerry Linenger, John Blaha and Jeff Wisoff gather around the wardroom table, sampling Russian food.

STS-81 involved the transfer of 2,710 kilograms (5,970 lb) of logistics to and from the Mir, the largest transfer of items to date. During the docked phase, 635 kilograms (1,400 lb) of water, 516.1 kilograms (1,138 lb) of U.S. science equipment, 1,000.7 kilograms (2,206 lb) of Russian logistics along with 121.7 kilograms (268 lb) of miscellaneous material was transferred to Mir. Returned to Earth aboard Atlantis was 570.0 kilograms (1,256.6 lb) of U.S. science material, 404.5 kilograms (892 lb) of Russian logistics and 97.3 kilograms (215 lb) of miscellaneous material.

First Shuttle flight of 1997 highlighted by return of U.S. astronaut John Blaha to Earth after 118-day stay aboard Russian Space Station Mir and the largest transfer to date of logistics between the two spacecraft. Atlantis also returned carrying the first plants to complete a life cycle in space — a crop of wheat grown from seed to seed. This fifth of nine planned dockings continued Phase 1B of the NASA/Russian Space Agency cooperative effort, with Linenger becoming the third U.S. astronaut in succession to live on Mir. Same payload configuration flown on previous docking flight — featuring SPACEHAB Double module — flown again.

Blaha joined Mir 22 crew of Commander Valeri Korzun and Flight Engineer Aleksandr Kaleri on September 19, 1996, when he arrived there with the crew of STS-79. Linenger worked with the Mir 22 crew until the arrival in February of the Mir 23 crew of Commander Vasili Tsibliev, Flight Engineer Aleksandr Lazutkin and German researcher Reinhold Ewald. Ewald returned to Earth with the Mir 22 cosmonauts after a brief stay on the station. Astronaut Michael Foale replaced Linenger on Mir when the STS-84 mission arrived in May 1997.

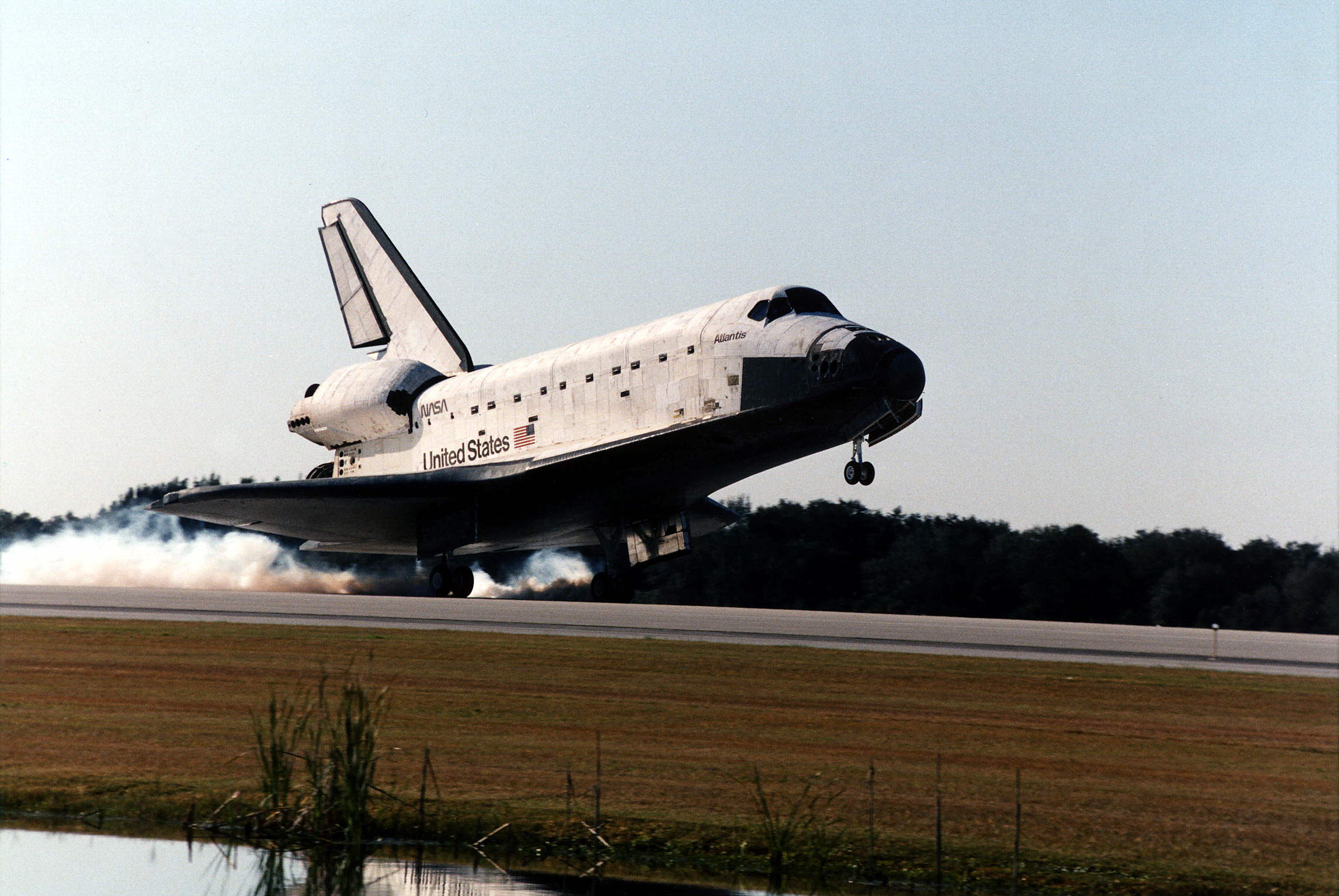
Space shuttle Atlantis touches down at the KSC to conclude the STS-81 mission.

Docking occurred at 22:55 EST, January 14, followed by hatch opening at 00:57 January 15. Linenger officially traded places at 04:45 with Blaha who spent 118 days on the station and 128 days total on-orbit. During five days of mated operations, crews transferred nearly 6,000 pounds (2,722 kilograms) of logistics to Mir, including around 725 kilograms (1,598 lb) of water; around 516 kilograms (1,138 lb) of U.S. science equipment; and 1,001 kilograms (2,207 lb) of Russian logistical equipment. About 1,100 kilograms (2,400 lb) of materials returned with Atlantis from Mir.

Crew also tested on Shuttle the Treadmill Vibration Isolation and Stabilization System (TVIS), designed for use in the Russian Service Module of the International Space Station. Another activity related to International Space Station involved firing the orbiter's small vernier jet thrusters during mated operations to gather engineering data.

Undocking occurred at 09:15 EST, January 19, followed by fly around of Mir.

No significant in-flight anomalies were experienced with Atlantis.

== Wake-up calls ==
NASA began a tradition of playing music to astronauts during the Gemini program, which was first used to wake up a flight crew during Apollo 15. Each track is specially chosen, often by their families, and usually has a special meaning to an individual member of the crew, or is applicable to their daily activities.

Flight Day	Song	Artist/Composer
Day 2	"Free Ride"	The Edgar Winter Group
Day 3	"It Keeps You Runnin'"	The Doobie Brothers
Day 4	"Hitchin' a Ride"	Vanity Fare
Day 5	"Celebration"	Kool and the Gang
Day 6	"I Got You (I Feel Good)"	James Brown
Day 7	"Mack the Knife"	Bobby Darin
Day 8	"Ticket to Ride"	The Beatles
Day 9	"My Favorite Marsha"	The Alison Brown Quartet
Day 10	"The Banana Boat Song"	Harry Belafonte

== See also ==
- List of human spaceflights
- List of Space Shuttle missions
- Outline of space science
