= GEOS-3 =

Scientific satellite in the 1970s

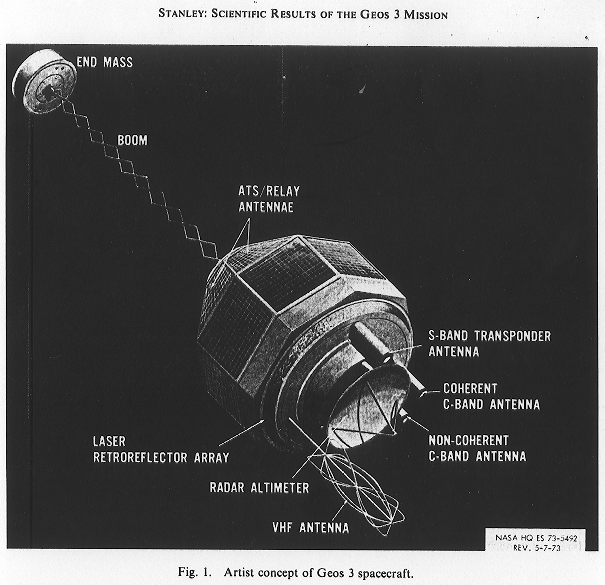
- GEOS-3
- Mission type: Geodesy
- Operator: NASA
- COSPAR ID: 1975-027A
- SATCAT no.: 7734
- Website: ilrs.gsfc.nasa.gov
- Mission duration: 4 years and 3 months

Spacecraft properties
- Spacecraft type: GEOS
- Manufacturer: JHU / APL
- Launch mass: 346 kilograms (763 lb)
- Dimensions: 1.32 by 0.81 meters (4.3 ft × 2.7 ft); 6 meters (20 ft) long with boom deployed

Start of mission
- Launch date: 9 April 1975, 23:58:02 UTC
- Rocket: Delta 1410
- Launch site: Vandenberg SLC-2W
- Contractor: NASA

End of mission
- Deactivated: July 1979

Orbital parameters
- Reference system: Geocentric
- Regime: Low Earth
- Semi-major axis: 7,208.68 kilometers (4,479.27 mi)
- Eccentricity: 0.001273
- Perigee altitude: 828 kilometers (514 mi)
- Apogee altitude: 846 kilometers (526 mi)
- Inclination: 114.98 degrees
- Period: 101.52 minutes
- Epoch: 14 January 2014, 03:51:02 UTC

Instruments
- Radar altimeter (ALT); Retroreflector array (RRA); Doppler beacon; S-band antenna; C-band antenna (Two); SST Tracking

GEOS-3, or Geodynamics Experimental Ocean Satellite 3, or GEOS-C, was the third and final satellite as part of NASA's Geodetic Earth Orbiting Satellite/Geodynamics Experimental Ocean Satellite program (NGSP) to better understand and test satellite tracking systems. For GEOS 1 and GEOS 2, the acronym stands for Geodetic Earth Orbiting Satellite; this was changed for GEOS-3.

== Introduction ==
The satellite mission was designed to further an understanding of the earth's gravitational field, size and shape of the terrestrial geoid, deep ocean tides, sea state, current structure, crustal structure, solid earth dynamics, and remote sensing technology. Jerome Rosenburg at NASA Headquarters initiated the GEOS-3 project in 1970. The project was to serve as a stepping stone between the GEOS program and the emerging NASA Earth and Ocean Physics Application Program. GEOS-1 and GEOS-2 had provided useful information about the structure of the earth's gravitational field, but new technology was deemed necessary to gain a further understanding. The project was cancelled due to budgetary concerns after an initial one-year study, but was re-instated in late 1971. The satellite was launched on April 9, 1975 and remained operational until late July 1979.

== Instruments ==
The following is a list of instruments/systems that were on board or part of the GEOS-3 satellite, including a description of their general purpose:

- Radar Altimeter (ALT) – A multimode radar system with the ability to provide precise satellite-to-ocean surface height measurements. The radar system provided global and intensive data gathering modes, which could provide height precision measurements at 50 cm and 20 cm respectively.
- Retroreflector Array (RRA) – An array of retroreflectors. These allow a ground-based laser to provide range information.
- Doppler System – A system of dual frequency space borne doppler beacons at 162 and 324 MHz and a ground-based receiver station. This system was used to measure the effects of first-order ionospheric refraction and make corrections to the Doppler frequency.
- S-band Tracking System – A tracking system which had three modes of operations for satellite to satellite tracking, ground-station tracking, and direct unified S-band.
- C-band System – A system of two C-band radar transponders used to better understand the accuracies of the gravimetric and geometric measurements. The system also supported the altimeter and C-band calibration.
- Satellite-to-Satellite Tracking (SST) – The SST experiment consisted of the ground-based ATS ranging system, the wideband communication transponder on the ATS-6 geosynchronous spacecraft, and the ranging transponder on the GEOS-3 satellite.

== Impacts on the scientific community ==
The GEOS-3 mission provided data that furthered scientific understanding in various fields. The ocean height data set from this mission provided the first comprehensive coverage in most areas of the world's oceans, providing a better understanding of the ocean geoid. Ocean height also provided information about quasi-stationary departures from the geoid (the sea surface topography), for events like currents, eddies, storm surges, etc. The return waveform data was used to better understand the sea state at a level that was comparable to buoy-collected data. An unexpected result was the ability to use waveform data to derive surface wind speed, and the ability to maintain track over terrain and ice. Altimeter data from GEOS-3 has been utilized by many Earth's gravity models, including GEM-T3, JGM-1 and JGM-2.
