= Explorer 29 =

NASA satellite of the Explorer program

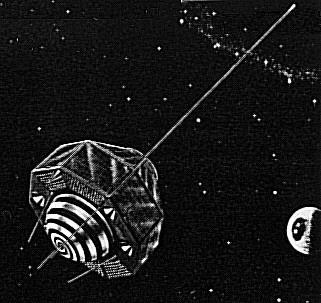
- Explorer 29 satellite
- Names: GEOS-1; GEOS-A; Geodetic Earth Orbiting Satellite
- Mission type: Earth science
- Operator: NASA
- COSPAR ID: 1965-089A
- SATCAT no.: 01726
- Mission duration: 2 years (achieved); 59 years, 6 months and 29 days (in orbit)

Spacecraft properties
- Spacecraft: Explorer XXIX
- Manufacturer: Johns Hopkins University; Applied Physics Laboratory
- Launch mass: 387 kg (853 lb)

Start of mission
- Launch date: 6 November 1965, 18:38:43 UTC
- Rocket: Thor-Delta E (Thor 457 / Delta 034)
- Launch site: Cape Canaveral, LC-17B
- Contractor: Douglas Aircraft Company
- Entered service: 6 November 1965

End of mission
- Last contact: 15 January 1968

Orbital parameters
- Reference system: Geocentric orbit
- Regime: Low Earth orbit
- Perigee altitude: 1,113 km (692 mi)
- Apogee altitude: 2,275 km (1,414 mi)
- Inclination: 59.40°
- Period: 120.30 minutes

Instruments
- Laser Tracking Reflectors; NASA Minitrack System; Optical Beacon System; Radio Doppler System; Radio Range/Rate System; SECOR Range Transponder

Explorer 29, also called GEOS 1 or GEOS A, acronym to Geodetic Earth Orbiting Satellite, was a NASA satellite launched as part of the Explorer program, being the first of the two satellites GEOS. Explorer 29 was launched on 6 November 1965 from Cape Canaveral, Florida, with a Thor-Delta E launch vehicle.

Explorer 29 was a gravity-gradient-stabilized, solar cell powered unit designed exclusively for geodetic studies. It was the first successful active spacecraft of the National Geodetic Satellite Program.

== Instruments ==
Instrumentation included:

- Laser Tracking Reflectors
- NASA Minitrack System
- Optical Beacon System
- Radio Doppler System
- Radio Range/Rate System
- SECOR Range Transponder

These were designed to operate simultaneously to fulfill the objectives of locating observation points (geodetic control stations) in a three-dimensional Earth center of mass coordinate system within 10 m (33 ft) of accuracy, of defining the structure of the Earth's irregular gravitational field and refining the locations and magnitudes of the large gravity anomalies, and of comparing results of the various systems on board the spacecraft to determine the most accurate and reliable system. Acquisition and recording of data were the responsibility of the Goddard Space Flight Center (GSFC) Spacecraft Tracking and Data Acquisition Network (STADAN). Ten major observing networks were used.

== Experiments ==
=== Laser Tracking Reflectors ===
Laser corner reflectors, composed of fused quartz cubes with silvered reflecting surfaces, were used for determining the spacecraft's range and angle. The 322 cubes were mounted on fiberglass panels on the bottom rim of the spacecraft and provided a total reflecting area of 0.18-m^{2}. The reflectors conserved the narrow beamwidth of incoming light and reflected a maximum signal to the Earth, almost exactly to where it originated. Fifty percent of the light which struck the prism area at a 90° angle was reflected within a beam of 20 arc-seconds. Reflected light received by ground telescopes was amplified by a photomultiplier tube that converted the optical impulse to an electrical signal. The time for the beam to return to the Earth was recorded by a digital counter. The reflected laser pulse was also photographed against the stellar background. Total time traveled by the light pulses was also considered in the optical laser tracking system.

=== NASA Minitrack System ===
The Minitrack beacon onboard GEOS 1 transmitted on 136 MHz. The minitrack interferometer tracking system was used in combination with the NASA Range and Range-Rate System to establish the GEOS-1 orbit. Raw data from the two systems were used for early orbit determinations and routine orbit updating. The orbit computation center processed the data with the general orbit determination input program and prepared a data tape for use in the general orbit determination differential correction program on the IBM 7094. Minitrack acquired 16,271 data points (station axis crossings). The Minitrack stations also participated in mutual visibility events that involved tracking with other stations for tracking system intercomparison experiments. The system operated normally from 6 November 1965, until 14 January 1967, when the spacecraft system was turned off.

=== Optical Beacon System ===
The optical beacon system, used for geometric geodesy, consisted of four xenon 670-watt (1580 candle-second/flash) flash tubes housed in reflectors. These tubes were programmed to flash sequentially in a series of five or seven flashes at times when they could be optically observed from Earth. Observations were made by STADAN and SPEOPT MOTS 101 cm (40 in) and 61 cm (24 in) cameras, Smithsonian Astrophysical Observatory (SAO) Baker-Nunn and geodetic 91 cm (36 in) cameras, USAF PC 1000 cameras, and U.S. C&GS (Coastal and Geodetic Survey) BC-4 cameras. Telescopic cameras at three or more stations simultaneously photographed the flashes against the star background. Satellite position and angle of elevation from each station could then be determined by using star charts as guides. If two of the three stations had known positions, the coordinates of the third could be calculated by triangulation. The instrument operated satisfactorily from 18 November 1965, to 1 December 1966, when command capability was lost.

=== Radio Doppler System ===
The Doppler technique of timing and measuring the frequency shift of radio transmissions from a moving spacecraft was used to help establish the structure of the Earth's gravitational field to an accuracy of approximately five parts in 100 million. Three transmitters were operated on frequencies of 162, 324, 972-MHz. Timing markers (bursts of 60° phase modulation) of 0.3-seconds duration once each minute were carried by the 162- and 324-MHz transmitters. Synchronization of the markers was to an accuracy of 0.4 ms. The system began operating during November 1965. The 972-MHz Doppler operated until 14 January 1967, when an intermittent command system response caused a permanent turn-off. The two lower frequency beacons operated continuously until December 1967, when operations became intermittent and progressively weaker. Operations were terminated on 15 January 1968.

=== Radio Range/Rate System ===
The onboard transponder, which operated on 2271 (receiver) and 1705-MHz (transmitter), and a conical antenna were the spacecraft components of the NASA Range and Range-Rate System for determining the range and the radial velocity of the spacecraft by making phase shift and Doppler measurements. The antenna, mounted on the Earth-facing portion of the spacecraft, could receive and transmit data. Its beam width was 150°. Data received from this instrument by three FR ARR S-band stations were used to augment other geodetic data and to provide a comparison of this system with others used in tracking the spacecraft. During the operational life of the spacecraft, 954 data passes were obtained, 730 of which were considered successful. The command system failure on 1 December 1966, made measurements impossible after that date.

=== SECOR Range Transponder ===
The Sequential Collation of Range (SECOR) system operated by the Army Map Service (AMS) (now identified as ETR) was used for the spacecraft radio range system. A 3.6 kg (7.9 lb) transponder received and retransmitted ground radio signals. Ground-based equipment included phase-modulated transmitters, range-data receivers, and electronic phasemeters. The transponder provided valuable ranging data for four U.S. SECOR stations to make possible inter-comparison tests from 29 December 1965 to 1 May 1966. Inter-datum and inter-island ties were completed from Tokyo to Hawaii using data from SECOR tracking stations and other geodetic observations made between 24 May 1966 and 8 February 1967. During this latter time period, the system was also used in the first phase of establishing the SECOR equatorial belt. Early data were affected by noise, but all data received were considered valuable. The transponder failed on 8 February 1967.

== See also ==
- Explorer program
- Explorer 36
- Geos 3
