= Explorer 27 =

NASA satellite of the Explorer program

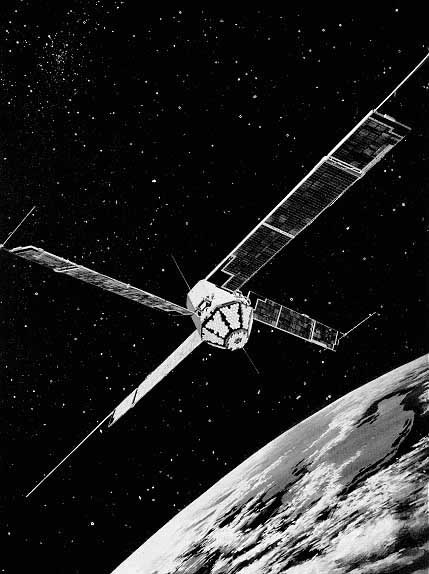
- Depiction of Explorer 27 in orbit
- Names: BE-C; Beacon Explorer-C; Beacon-C; NASA S-66C
- Mission type: Ionospheric research
- Operator: NASA
- COSPAR ID: 1965-032A
- SATCAT no.: 01328
- Mission duration: 61 years, 1 month and 27 days (in orbit)

Spacecraft properties
- Spacecraft: Explorer XXVII
- Bus: Beacon Explorer
- Manufacturer: Johns Hopkins University; Applied Physics Laboratory
- Launch mass: 60.8 kg (134 lb)
- Dimensions: 30 × 45 cm (12 × 18 in)
- Power: 4 deployable solar arrays and batteries

Start of mission
- Launch date: 29 April 1965, 14:17:00 GMT
- Rocket: Scout X-4 (S-136R)
- Launch site: Wallops Flight Facility,
- Contractor: Vought
- Entered service: 29 April 1965

End of mission
- Last contact: 20 July 1973

Orbital parameters
- Reference system: Geocentric orbit
- Regime: Low Earth orbit
- Perigee altitude: 927 km (576 mi)
- Apogee altitude: 1,320 km (820 mi)
- Inclination: 41.10°
- Period: 107.70 minutes

Instruments
- Langmuir probes Laser Tracking Reflectors; Radio Beacon; Radio Doppler System

Explorer 27 (or BE-C or Beacon Explorer-C, Beacon-C or S-66C) was a small NASA satellite, launched in 1965, designed to conduct scientific research in the ionosphere. It was powered by 4 solar panels. One goal of the mission was to study in detail the shape of the Earth by way of investigating variations in its gravitational field. It was the third and last of the Beacons in the Explorers program. The satellite was shut off in July 1973 so that its transmission band could be used by higher-priority spacecraft.

== Spacecraft ==
Built at the Applied Physics Laboratory (APL), under the direction of Goddard Space Flight Center, Explorer 27 began as S-66C, the last of the five satellites in NASA's first stage of ionospheric exploration, and the first of five NASA geodetic satellites. Its primary mission was "to conduct ionospheric measurements on a worldwide basis. The program will determine the total electron content of a vertical cross-section of the ionosphere located between the satellite and the Earth. Accomplishing this objective will aid in establishing the behavior pattern of the ionosphere as a function of latitude, time of day, season, and solar cycle".

Weighing 60.8 kg (134 lb), the satellite was an octagonal spacecraft with a honeycomb nylon and fiberglass hull, 45 cm (18 in) in diameter, 30 cm (12 in) high, with four solar panels 25 cm (9.8 in) wide and 170 cm (67 in) long.

A three-axis magnetometer and Sun sensors provided information on the satellite attitude and spin rate. There was no tape recorder aboard so that satellite could be received only when the satellite was within range of a ground telemetry station. Continuous Doppler transmitters operated at 162 MHz and 324-MHz to permit precise tracking by Transit tracking stations for navigation and geodetic studies. Four other transmitters operated on 20, 40, 41, and 360-MHz to measure ionospheric density. Explorer 27's last experiment was an Electron Density Experiment designed for measuring charged particles in the immediate vicinity of the satellite.

S-66 mounted 360 25 mm (0.98 in) "cube corner" retroreflectors made of fused silica, so that the satellite could be tracked via lasers beamed from mobile stations at Wallops Flight Facility (WFF).

== History ==
The first S-66 was scheduled for launch in late 1963. However, due to problems with the Scout X-4, the flight was rescheduled for the following year on a Delta B, from Cape Canaveral LC-17A. On 19 March 1964, the first attempt to this S-66 ended in failure when the third stage of its Delta launch vehicle burned just 22 seconds instead of the programmed 40 seconds. This was only the second time the Delta launch vehicle had failed, and the incident followed 22 prior successes.

A second S-66 was launched, this time successfully, via a Scout X-4 launch vehicle at 03:01 GMT, on 9 October 1964, from the PALC-D launch facility at Vandenberg Air Force Base. Once in space, it became known as Explorer 22. Explorer 22's as-yet unnamed backup was scheduled for launch in March/April 1965 to extend the geodetic experiments of its predecessor. Upon the backup's launch on 29 April 1965 at 14:17:00 GMT via Scout X-4 from Wallops Island, this third S-66 satellite was designated Explorer 27.

== Experiments ==
=== Langmuir Probes ===
Two cylindrical electrostatic probes of the Langmuir probe type were used. They consisted of a collector electrode extending from the central axis of a cylindrical guard ring. The guard ring extended 5 cm (2.0 in) from the spacecraft and the probe extended 23 cm (9.1 in). A 2-Hz sawtooth voltage of -3 to +5 volts was swept to either of the probes, and the resulting current profile to the probe was telemetered. From this profile, the electron density, electron temperature, and mean ion mass were determined. This experiment performed nominally from launch until 13 August 1968, when solar cell degradation resulting from radiation prevented operation of all systems on the satellite. The probe was not operated after that time. No archival data were produced since the experiment was a back-up for the Explorer 22 (BE-B) mission, which had been flown successfully.

=== Laser Tracking Reflectors ===
The passive optical laser experiment, which consisted of nine panels on the spacecraft, was used to determine the spacecraft range and angle. Each panel was covered with 40 quartz cube-corner prisms that provided laser tracking capabilities for optical tracking studies. The ground-based optical transmitter was a pulsed 1-ms ruby laser. A photodetector determined whether the laser beam interrupted the spacecraft.

=== Radio Beacon ===
A radio beacon radiated a plane-polarized signal at 20.005 MHz, 40.010 MHz, 41.010 MHz, and 360.090 MHz, all harmonics of 1.00025 MHz. The plane of polarization of the three lower frequencies underwent an appreciable number of rotations due to electron concentration. The polarization plane of highest frequency did not rotate appreciably. Several methods were used to analyze these rotations and determine the total electron content between the satellite and a ground receiver. The beacons were on until the satellite operation terminated on 6 May 1968. On 13 February 1970, the beacons were again turned on to replace the Explorer 22 (1964-064A - BE-B) beacons which had completely failed by the end of January 1970.

=== Radio Doppler System ===
Two coherent, unmodulated CW transmitters, operating on frequencies of 162 and 324 MHz, allowed the Tranet Doppler Network to obtain data for studies of dynamic geodesy. The frequencies were generated from redundant, dual, ultra-stable crystal oscillators operating on a frequency of 5 MHz minus 80 ppm. The system operated as planned.

== Results ==
Explorer 27 was turned off on 20 July 1973 because it was interfering with other, more important satellites. Tracking of the satellite via its passive laser reflectors continued at least into the 21st century.

== See also ==
- Explorer 22
- Explorer program
