= STS-52 =

1992 American crewed spaceflight to deploy LAGEOS-2

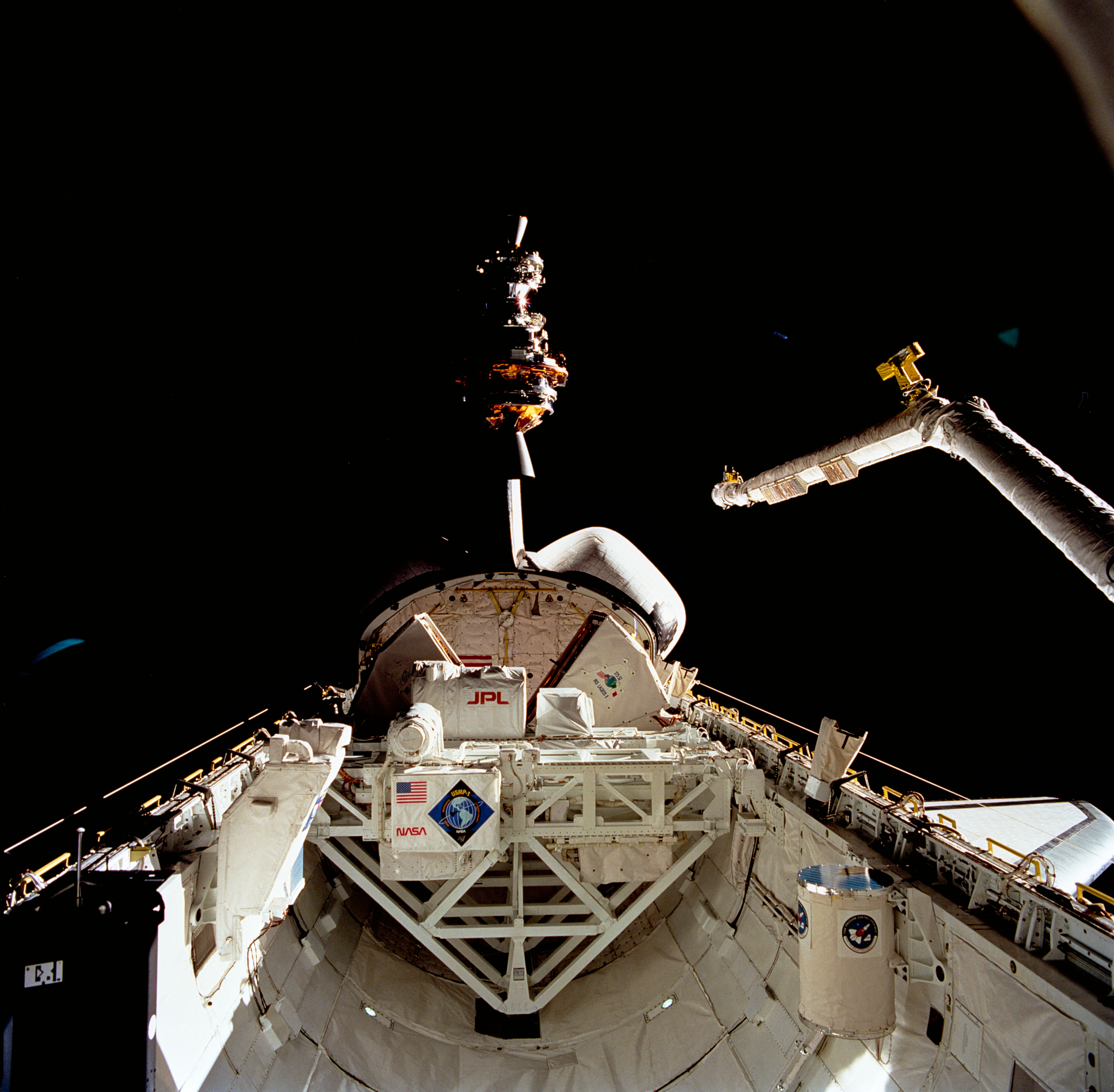
- Columbia's payload bay, with the LAGEOS 2 satellite being deployed.
- Names: Space Transportation System-52
- Mission type: LAGEOS 2 satellite deployment Microgravity research
- Operator: NASA
- COSPAR ID: 1992-070A
- SATCAT no.: 22194
- Mission duration: 9 days, 20 hours, 56 minutes, 13 seconds
- Distance travelled: 6,645,026 km (4,129,028 mi)
- Orbits completed: 159

Spacecraft properties
- Spacecraft: Space Shuttle Columbia
- Launch mass: 113,460 kg (250,140 lb)
- Landing mass: 97,574 kg (215,114 lb)
- Payload mass: 8,078 kg (17,809 lb)

Crew
- Crew size: 6
- Members: Jim Wetherbee; Michael A. Baker; Charles L. Veach; William Shepherd; Tamara E. Jernigan; Steve MacLean

Start of mission
- Launch date: October 22, 1992, 17:09:39 UTC (1:09:39 pm EDT)
- Launch site: Kennedy, LC-39B
- Contractor: Rockwell International

End of mission
- Landing date: November 1, 1992, 14:05:53 UTC (9:05:53 am EST)
- Landing site: Kennedy, SLF Runway 33

Orbital parameters
- Reference system: Geocentric orbit
- Regime: Low Earth orbit
- Perigee altitude: 300 km (190 mi)
- Apogee altitude: 302 km (188 mi)
- Inclination: 28.45°
- Period: 90.60 minutes

Instruments
- Canadian experiment (CANEX-2); Chemical Vapor Transport Experiment Heat Pipe Performance Experiment (CVTEHPPE); Lambda Point Experiment; Low Altitude Conical Earth Sensor (LACES); Materials Exposure in Low-Earth Orbit (MELEO); Matériel pour l'Étude des Phénomènes Intéressant la Solidification sur eT en Orbite (MEPHISTO); Modular Star Sensor (MOSS); Mission Peculiar Equipment Support Structures (MPESS); Orbiter Glow (OGLOW-2); Phase Partitioning in Liquids (PARLIQ); Queen's University Experiment in Liquid-Metal Diffusion (QUELD); Physiological Systems Experiment (PSE); Space Acceleration Measurement System (SAMS); Space Adaptation Tests and Observations (SATO); Shuttle Plume Impingement Experiment (SPIE); Sun Photospectrometre Earth Atmosphere Measurement (SPEAM-2); Space Vision System (SVS); Tank Pressure Control Experiment/Thermal Phenomena (TPCE/TP); Yaw Earth Sensor (YES)
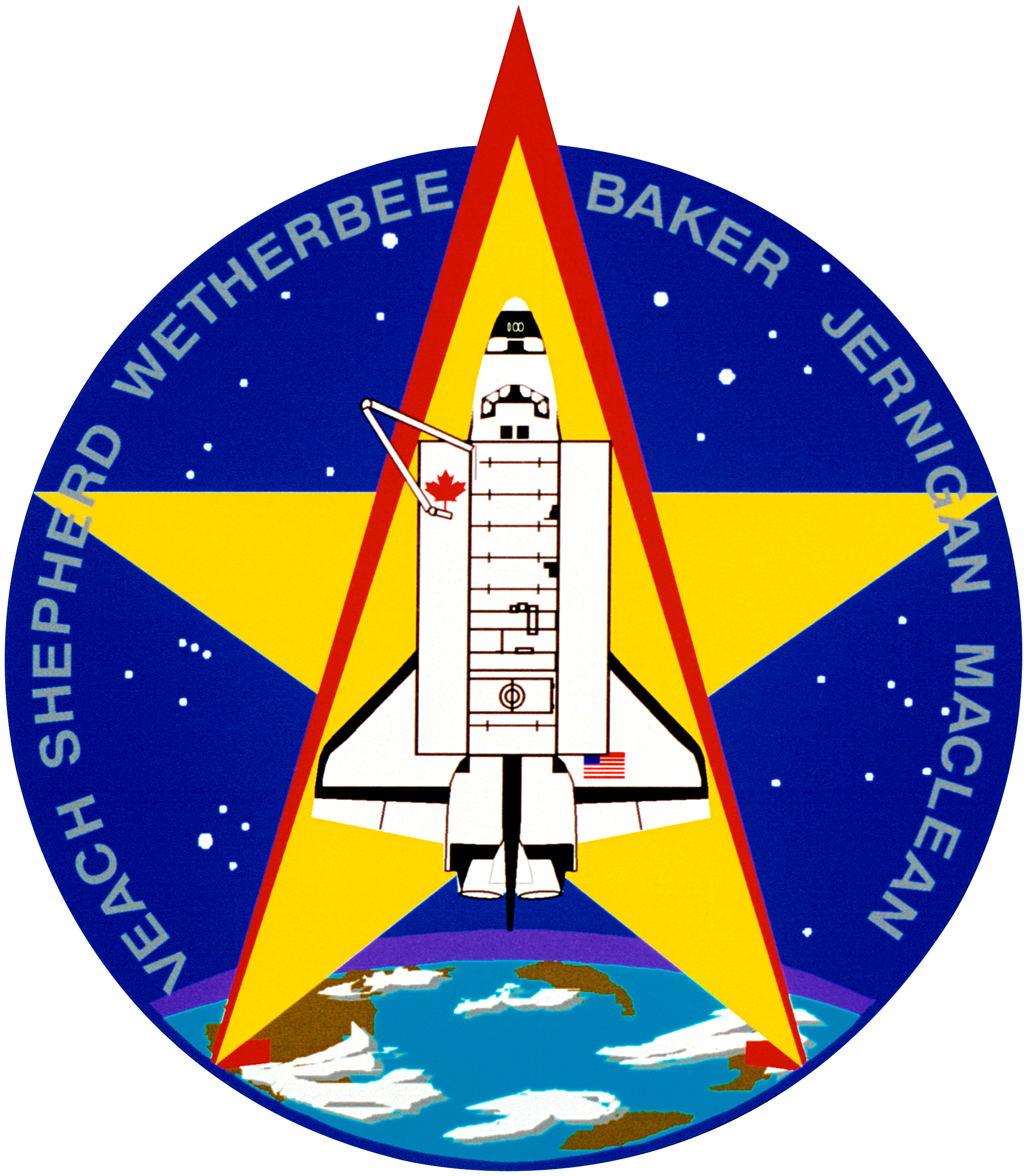
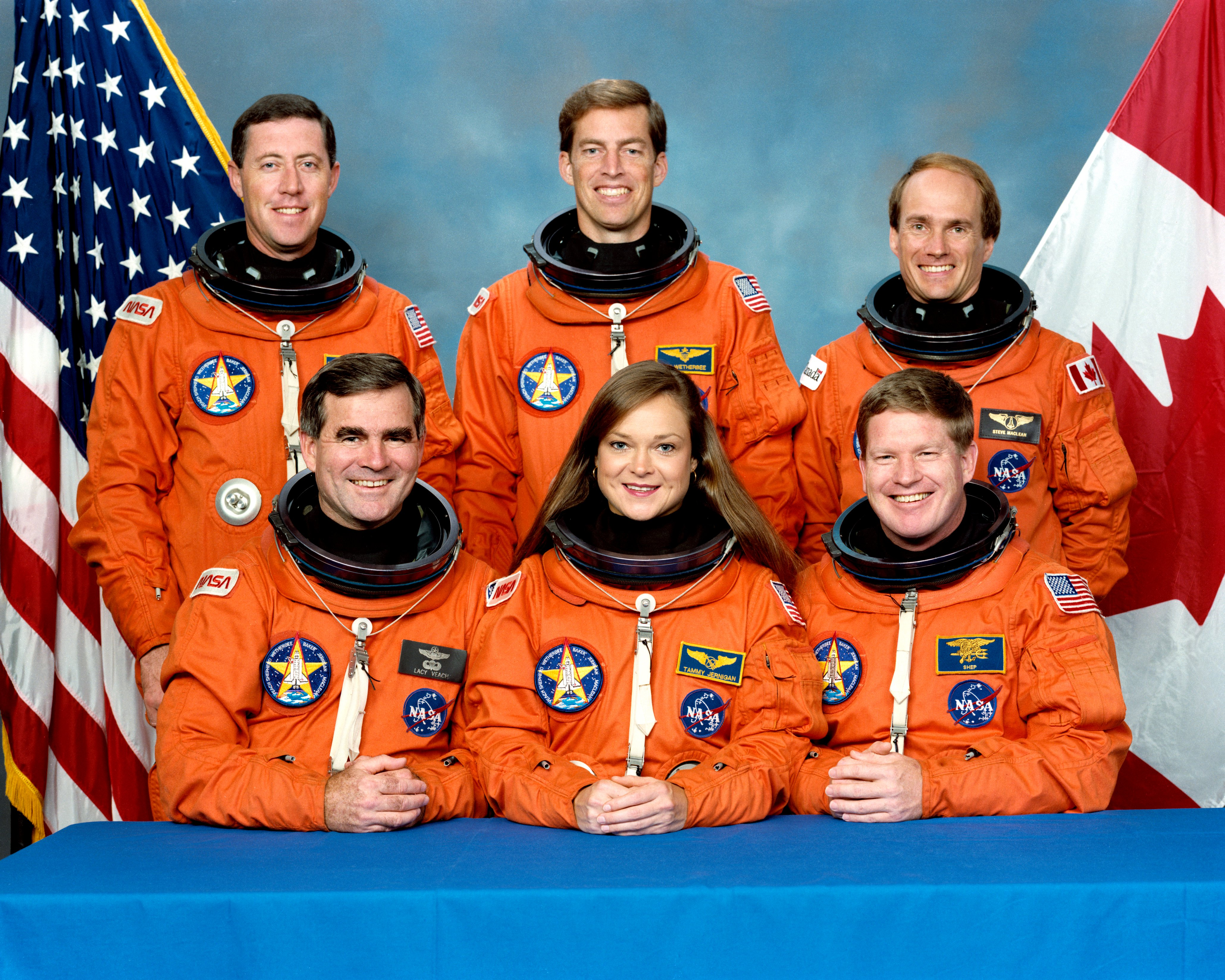
- STS-52 mission patch Back: Baker, Wetherbee and MacLean; Front: Veach, Jernigan and Shepherd Space Shuttle program

STS-52 was a NASA Space Shuttle mission using Space Shuttle Columbia, launched on October 22, 1992.

== Crew ==
Position	Astronaut
Commander	(United States) Jim Wetherbee; Second spaceflight
Pilot	(United States) Michael A. Baker; Second spaceflight
Mission Specialist 1	(United States) Charles L. Veach; Second and last spaceflight
Mission Specialist 2 Flight Engineer	(United States) William Shepherd; Third spaceflight
Mission Specialist 3	(United States) Tamara E. Jernigan; Second spaceflight
Payload Specialist 1	(Canada) Steve MacLean, CSA; First spaceflight

Backup crew
Position	Astronaut
Payload Specialist 1	(Canada) Bjarni Tryggvason, CSA

=== Crew seat assignments ===
Seat	Launch	Landing	Seats 1–4 are on the flight deck. Seats 5–7 are on the mid-deck.
1	Wetherbee		Seats 1–4 are on the flight deck. Seats 5–7 are on the mid-deck.
2	Baker		Seats 1–4 are on the flight deck. Seats 5–7 are on the mid-deck.
3	Veach	Jernigan	Seats 1–4 are on the flight deck. Seats 5–7 are on the mid-deck.
4	Shepherd		Seats 1–4 are on the flight deck. Seats 5–7 are on the mid-deck.
5	Jernigan	Veach	Seats 1–4 are on the flight deck. Seats 5–7 are on the mid-deck.
6	MacLean		Seats 1–4 are on the flight deck. Seats 5–7 are on the mid-deck.
7	Unused		Seats 1–4 are on the flight deck. Seats 5–7 are on the mid-deck.

== Mission highlights ==
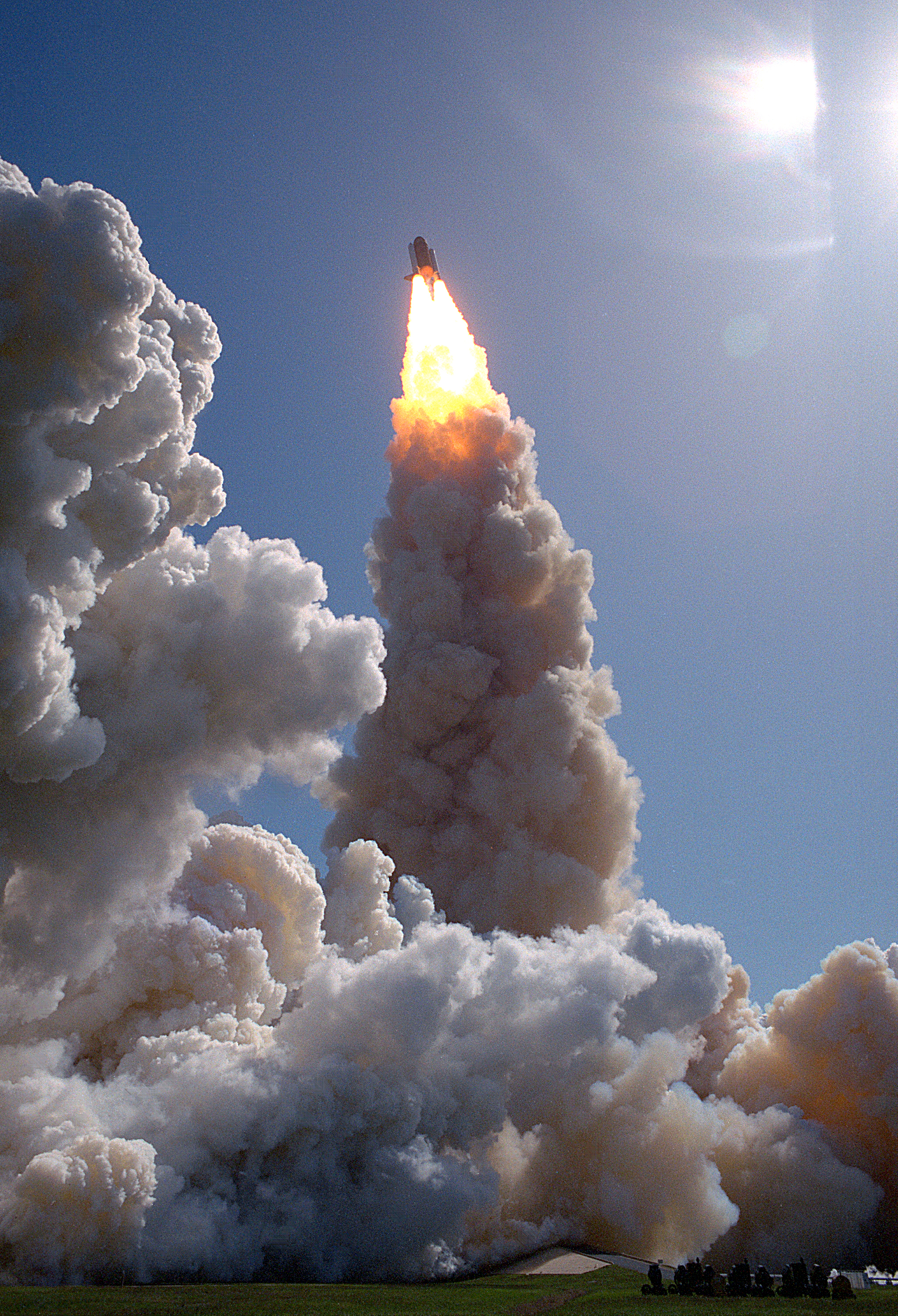
Liftoff

Primary mission objectives were deployment of the Laser Geodynamics Satellite 2 (LAGEOS-2) and operation of the U.S. Microgravity Payload-1 (USMP-1). LAGEOS 2, a joint effort between NASA and the Italian Space Agency (ASI), was deployed on day 2 and boosted into an initial elliptical orbit by ASI's Italian Research Interim Stage (IRIS). The spacecraft's apogee kick motor later circularized LAGEOS 2 orbit at its operational altitude of 5,900 km (3,700 mi). The USMP-1, activated on day one, included three experiments mounted on two connected Mission Peculiar Equipment Support Structures (MPESS) mounted in the orbiter's cargo bay. USMP-1 experiments were: Lambda Point Experiment; Matériel pour l'Étude des Phénomènes Intéressant la Solidification sur eT en Orbite (MEPHISTO), sponsored by the French agency Centre National d'Études Spatiales (CNES); and Space Acceleration Measurement System (SAMS).

Secondary payloads: (1) Canadian experiment (CANEX-2), located in both the orbiter's cargo bay and middeck and which consisted of Space Vision System (SVS); Materials Exposure in Low-Earth Orbit (MELEO); Queen's University Experiment in Liquid-Metal Diffusion (QUELD); Phase Partitioning in Liquids (PARLIQ); Sun Photospectrometre Earth Atmosphere Measurement-2 (SPEAM-2); Orbiter Glow-2 (OGLOW-2); and Space Adaptation Tests and Observations (SATO). A small, specially marked satellite, the Canadian Target Assembly (CTA), was deployed on day nine, to support SVS experiments. (2) ASP, featuring three independent sensors mounted on a Hitchhiker plate in the cargo bay – Modular Star Sensor (MOSS), Yaw Earth Sensor (YES) and Low Altitude Conical Earth Sensor (LACES), all provided by the European Space Agency (ESA).

Other middeck payloads: Commercial Materials Dispersion Apparatus Instrument Technology Associates Experiments; Commercial Protein Crystal Growth experiment; Chemical Vapor Transport Experiment Heat Pipe Performance Experiment (CVTEHPPE); Physiological Systems Experiment (PSE) (involving 12 rodents); and Shuttle Plume Impingement Experiment (SPIE). The orbiter also was used as a reference point for calibrating an Ultraviolet Plume Instrument on an orbiting Strategic Defense Initiative Organization (SDIO) satellite.

The Tank Pressure Control Experiment/Thermal Phenomena (TPCE/TP) was contained in a Getaway Special (GAS) canister in the orbiter's cargo bay.

Some of the ashes of Star Trek creator Gene Roddenberry were also carried aboard the orbiter for the duration of the mission.

== Wake-up calls ==
NASA began a tradition of playing music to astronauts during the Project Gemini, and first used music to wake up a flight crew during Apollo 15. A special musical track is chosen for each day in space, often by the astronauts' families, to have a special meaning to an individual member of the crew, or in reference to the day's planned activities.

Day	Song	Artist/Composer	Played For
Day 2	Wake Up Columbia	Crow Carroll	
Day 3	Shake, Rattle and Roll	Big Joe Turner	Deployment of LAGEOS-II
Day 5	The World is Waiting for the Sunrise	Les Paul and Mary Ford	
Day 6	Birthday	The Beatles	Mike Baker's 39th Birthday
Day 7	"Hawaiian music"		
Day 8	Mack the Knife	Bobby Darin	
Day 9	Bang the Drum	Todd Rundgren	
Day 10	Monster Mash	Bobby "Boris" Picket	To celebrate Halloween
Day 11	Notre Dame Victory March	JSC employees & Notre Dame grads	James Wetherbee

== See also ==
- List of human spaceflights
- List of Space Shuttle missions
- Outline of space science
- Space Shuttle
