= Explorer 36 =

NASA satellite of the Explorer program

- Names: GEOS-2; Geodetic Earth Orbiting Satellite
- Mission type: Earth science
- Operator: NASA
- COSPAR ID: 1968-002A
- SATCAT no.: 03093
- Mission duration: 2 years (planned)

Spacecraft properties
- Spacecraft: Explorer XXXVI
- Spacecraft type: Geodetic Earth Orbiting Satellite
- Bus: GEOS
- Manufacturer: Johns Hopkins University; Applied Physics Laboratory
- Launch mass: 469 kg (1,034 lb)

Start of mission
- Launch date: 11 January 1968, 16:16:10 GMT
- Rocket: Thor-Delta E1 (Thor 454 / Delta 056)
- Launch site: Vandenberg, SLC-2E
- Contractor: Douglas Aircraft Company
- Entered service: 11 January 1968

Orbital parameters
- Reference system: Geocentric orbit
- Regime: Low Earth orbit
- Perigee altitude: 1,082 km (672 mi)
- Apogee altitude: 1,570 km (980 mi)
- Inclination: 105.80°
- Period: 112.20 minutes

Instruments
- C-Band Radar Transponder; Laser Tracking Reflector; Magnetometer; NASA Minitrack System; Optical Beacon System; Precipitating Electron Detector; Radio Doppler System; Radio Range/Rate System; SECOR Range Transponder

Explorer 36 (also called GEOS 2 or GEOS B, acronym for Geodetic Earth Orbiting Satellite) was a NASA satellite launched as part of the Explorer program, being the second of the two satellites GEOS. Explorer 36 was launched on 11 January 1968 from Vandenberg Air Force Base, with Thor-Delta E1 launch vehicle.

Explorer 36 was a gravity-gradient stabilized, solar cell powered spacecraft that carried electronic and geodetic instrumentation. The spacecraft's thermal control system was notable for the first non-experimental use of a heat pipe in a spacecraft.

== Instruments ==
The geodetic instrumentation systems included:

- C-Band Radar Transponder
- Laser Tracking Reflector
- Magnetometer
- NASA Minitrack System
- Optical Beacon System
- Precipitating Electron Detector
- Radio Doppler System
- Radio Range/Rate System
- SECOR Range Transponder

Non-geodetic systems included a laser detector and a Minitrack interferometer beacon. The objectives of the spacecraft were to optimize optical station visibility periods and to provide complementary data for inclination-dependent terms established by the Explorer 29 (GEOS 1) gravimetric studies. The spacecraft was placed into a retrograde orbit to accomplish these objectives. Operational problems occurred in the main power system, optical beacon flash system, and the spacecraft clock, and adjustments in scheduling resulted in nominal operations.

== Experiments ==
=== C-Band Radar Transponder ===
The C-band radar system was used for experimental range radar calibration and data recording to determine the accuracy of the system for geometric and gravimetric investigations. For redundancy, two transponders, each operating on 5690-MHz (RCVR) and 765-MHz (XMTR) were carried on the spacecraft. One transponder had a 5-ms interval time delay, and the other had a near-zero internal delay that allowed for real-time identification by the C-band participants. The transponders were operated on a select-call basis to conserve spacecraft power. A C-band passive reflector was used in conjunction with the transponders for precise calibration of the internal time delay and to provide passive C-band tracking capabilities.

=== Laser Tracking Reflector ===
Laser corner reflectors, composed of 322 fused quartz cubes with silvered reflecting surfaces, were used for determining the spacecraft range and angle. The cubes, which were mounted on fiberglass panels on the bottom rim of the spacecraft, provided a total reflecting area of 0.18 m^{2}. The reflectors conserved the narrow beamwidth of incoming light and provided a maximum signal to the ground almost exactly to where it originated. Fifty percent of the light that struck the prism area at a 90° angle was reflected within a beam of 20-arc-seconds. Reflected light received by ground telescopes was amplified by a photomultiplier tube that converted the optical impulse to an electrical signal. The time required for the beam to return to Earth was recorded by a digital counter. The reflected laser pulse was also photographed against the stellar background, and the total time traveled by the light pulses was considered in the optical laser tracking system. Laser tracking was the responsibility of Air Force Research Laboratory (AFCRL), Smithsonian Astrophysical Observatory (SAO), GSFC Optical Research, and international laser stations.

=== Magnetometer ===
This instrument consisted of an uniaxial fluxgate magnetometer oriented perpendicular to the spacecraft orbit plane. Although the principal function of the magnetometer was to serve as an attitude sensor, a very limited amount of scientifically useful data on fluctuations in the range 0.03 to 3.0 cps were obtained through use of a filter.

=== NASA Minitrack System ===
The Minitrack beacon radiated on 136-MHz and was modulated with telemetry data. The minitrack interferometer tracking system data were used in combination with the Goddard Range and Range Rate (GRARR) system data to establish the Explorer 36 orbit and to compute operational predictions. The minitrack stations also participated with other stations in mutual visibility events for tracking systems comparison experiments.

=== Optical Beacon System ===
The optical beacon system, used for geometric geodesy studies, consisted of four xenon 670-watts (1580 candle-second/flash) Flashtubes housed in reflectors. These tubes were programmed to flash sequentially, in a series of five or seven flashes, at times when they could be optically observed from Earth. Observations were made by SPEOPT MOTS 1 m (3 ft 3 in) and 60 cm (24 in) cameras, Smithsonian Astrophysical Observatory (SAO) Baker-Nunn and geodetic 90 cm (35 in) cameras, USAF PC 1000 cameras, U.S. C&GS (Coast and Geodetic Survey) BC-4 cameras, and Army Map Service (AMS, now ETR) and international camera stations. The position of the satellite and the angle of elevation from each station were determined by using star charts as guides. If two of three stations had known positions, the coordinates of the third could be calculated by triangulation. Erratic operations in one beacon assembly occurred soon after launch. This beacon (no. 4) was not used during the remainder of the operations. Data were obtained from the three other beacons until 31 January 1970.

=== Precipitating Electron Detector ===
This instrument consisted of an Electrostatic deflection device and channeltron detector intended to measure electrons in the energy range 2 to 10 keV. No useful data were obtained.

=== Radio Doppler System ===
The Doppler technique of timing and measuring the frequency shift of radio transmissions from a moving spacecraft was used to help establish the structure of the Earth's gravitational field to an accuracy of approximately five parts in 100 million. Three transmitters were operated on frequencies of 162, 324, and 972-MHz. Timing markers (bursts of 60° phase modulation of 0.3-seconds duration once each minute) were carried by the 162- and 324-MHz transmitters. Synchronization of the markers was to an accuracy of 0.4 ms. The U.S. Navy Doppler Tracking Network (TRANET) monitored the spacecraft for Doppler data. Observations made from three or more known stations allowed deduction of orbital parameters. Data from the system were recorded on paper tape, then were reproduced on magnetic tape for further processing.

=== Radio Range/Rate System ===
The Goddard Range and Range Rate (GRARR) system data was capable of determining both the range and the rate of change of the range of the spacecraft by measuring phase shift and Doppler. The system, which operated on 2271-MHz (receiver) and 1705-MHz (transmitter), utilized an antenna mounted on the Earth-facing portion of the spacecraft. The beam-width was 150° data received from this instrument by three GRARR S-band stations were used to augment other geodetic data and to provide a comparison of this system with others used in tracking the spacecraft. The data received were placed on paper tape and were reproduced by the CDC 160A computer on magnetic tape for further processing.

=== SECOR Range Transponder ===
The Sequential Collation of Range (SECOR) System, operated by the Army Map Service (now identified as ETR), was used for the spacecraft's radio range system. The SECOR System operated on 421-MHz (receiver) and 224.5 and 449.0-MHz (transmitter). A 3.6 kg (7.9 lb) transponder received and retransmitted ground radio signals. The ground-based equipment included phase-modulated transmitters, range-data receivers, and electronic phasemeters. The system used four ground stations for ranging to the spacecraft transponder. The range measurements were made by measuring the phase shift of the ranging sidetones that modulated the CW carrier. By using trilateration techniques, the unknown position of one of the four stations could be accurately determined.

== See also ==
- Explorer 29
- Explorer program
