= Robert E. Huffman =

American space scientist and author

Dr. Robert E. Huffman (1931–2008) was an American space scientist and author. He specialized in ultraviolet spectroscopy in the earth's upper atmosphere. Working for the United States Air Force, Dr. Huffman managed the Horizon Ultraviolet Program (HUP) experiments on two Space Shuttle flights: Columbia (STS-4, 1982) and Discovery (AFP-675 on STS-39, 1991).

Dr. Huffman was also the principal investigator for the Auroral Ionospheric Mapper (AIM) on the HILAT Spacecraft and the Auroral/Ionospheric Remote Sensor (AIRS) on the Polar BEAR Spacecraft. In 1983 the Auroral Ionospheric Mapper produced the first pictures of Aurora Borealis made under full daylight conditions. Although the aurora cannot be seen in the visible spectrum during daylight hours, Dr. Huffman's instrument was able to capture an image in the ultraviolet spectrum.

In the early 1970s Dr. Huffman was Program Manager for Project Chaser, a series of launches of Aerobee 170 sounding rockets from Vandenberg AFB Probe Launch Complex C. The purpose of Project Chaser was to measure exhaust plumes from anti-ballistic missile systems launched simultaneously with Project Chaser.

His memoir "Adventures of a Star Warrior: Cold War Rocket Science on the Space Frontier" was published posthumously.

== Awards ==
- Valedictorian Texas A&M University (1953)
- The Guenter Loeser Memorial Award by the Air Force Cambridge Research Laboratories (1968)
- The Marcus O'Day Award by the Air Force Cambridge Research Laboratories (1981)
- Johns Hopkins University Applied Physics Laboratory Annual Award for Outstanding Paper in an Unclassified Refereed Journal (1984)
- Outstanding Civilian Career Service Award, Department of the Air Force (1998)

== Bibliography ==
- Huffman, Robert E., (1992), "Atmospheric Ultraviolet Remote Sensing", Academic Press
- Huffman, Robert E., Ed., (1993) "Selected Papers on Ultraviolet Optics and Technology", SPIE
- Huffman, Robert E. "Adventures of a Star Warrior: Cold War Rocket Science on the Space Frontier"
