= Critical velocity =

Critical velocity may refer to

- Critical ionization velocity, relative velocity between a neutral gas and plasma at which the neutral gas will start to ionize
- Speed of sound, at the throat of a rocket (otherwise known as throat velocity)
- Landau critical velocity, constant velocity of a superfluid equivalent to the bandgap width divided by the fermi momentum
- Velocity at which a liquid transitions from subcritical flow to supercritical flow
- The break-up velocity of a rapidly spinning star
- Velocity at which leukocytes switch from rolling to freely flowing in a blood vessel
