= AFP-675 =

Space Shuttle experiment package

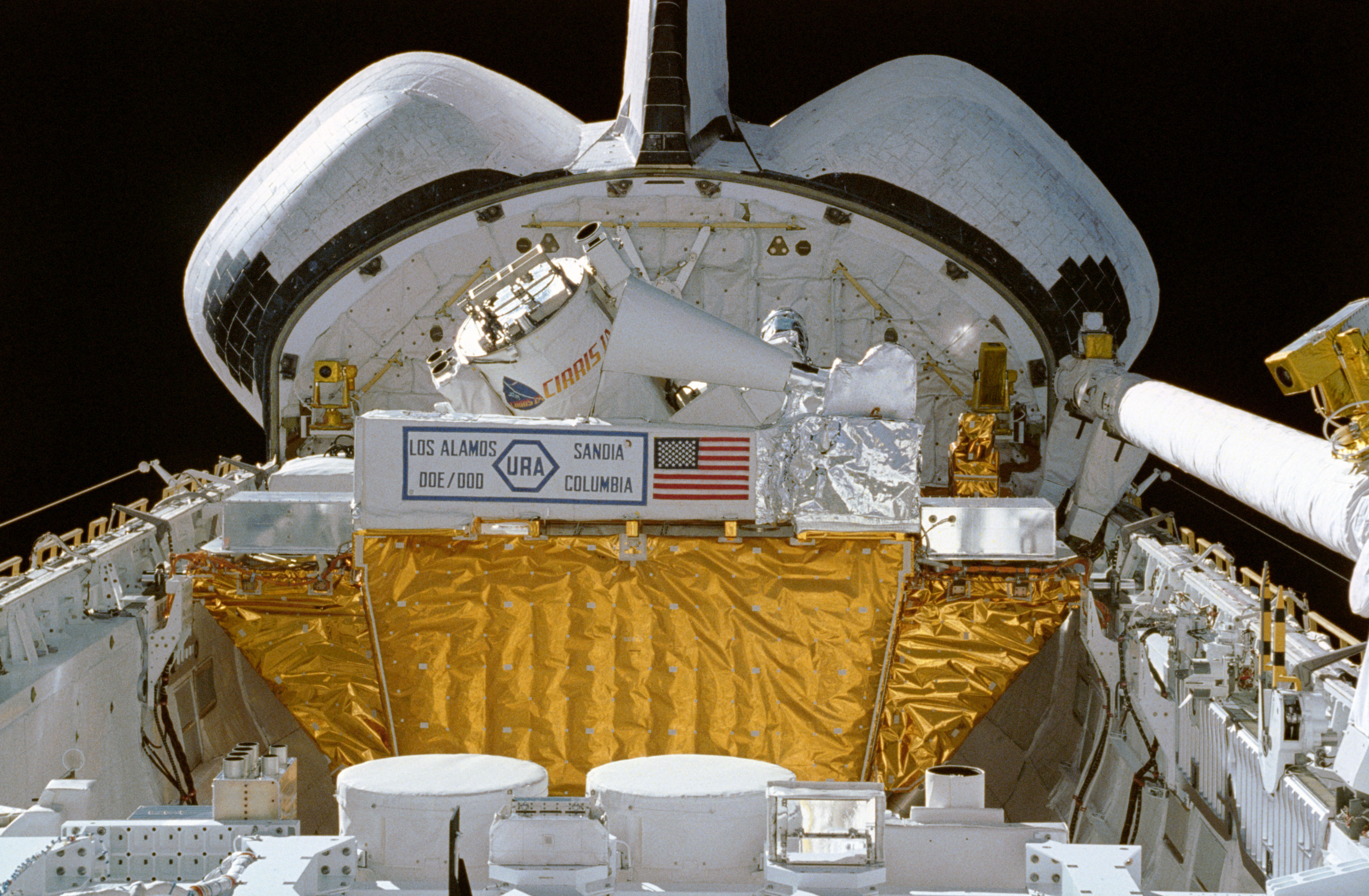
The AFP-675 experiment pallet in the cargo bay. The Uniformly Redundant Array (horn shape) and CIRRUS 1A (drum that reads CIRRUS) experiments can be seen atop the pallet.

AFP-675 (Air Force Program-675) was a Space Shuttle experiment package that was carried into orbit on Discovery as part of STS-39.

AFP-675 consisted of six experiment packages mounted on a pallet in the Discovery's cargo bay. The total weight of the package was 5,080 kilograms (11,200 lb). The objectives of the project were:

1. To obtain data in several wavelength regions to support the development of Department of Defense (DOD) systems
2. To validate technologies for DOD applications
3. To validate the use of man as an autonomous experimenter in space
4. To demonstrate the cost effectiveness of performing DOD experiments on reusable systems.

== The experiments ==
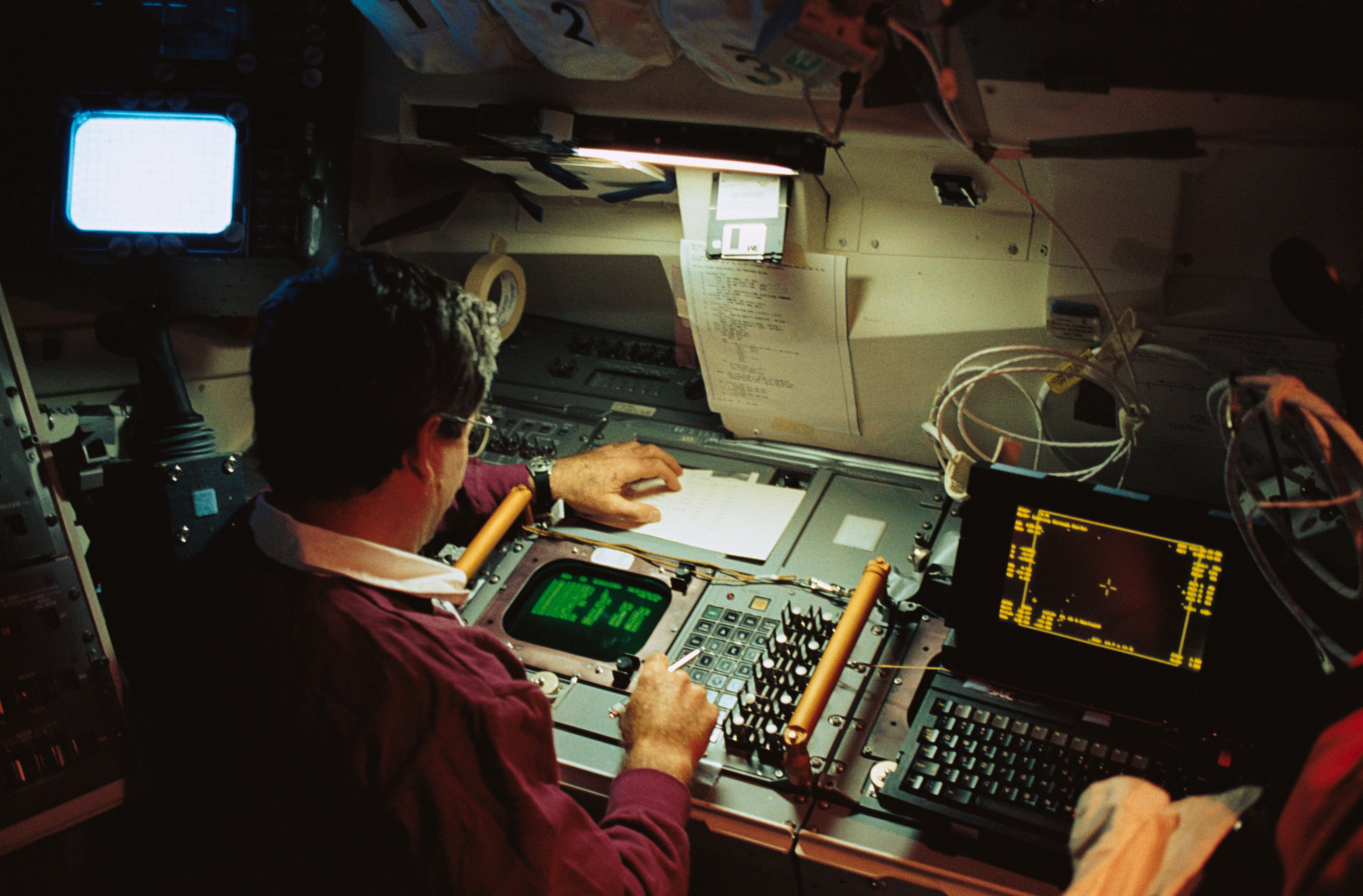
Mission Specialist Charles L. Veach monitors the AFP-675 panel on Discovery's aft flight deck.

=== Cryogenic Infrared Radiance Instrumentation for Shuttle ===
The Cryogenic Infrared Radiance Instrumentation for Shuttle (CIRRIS 1A) experiment was designed to measure the spectral, spatial, and temporal properties of the Earth's limb (edge). The primary instruments in this experiment were a Michelson spatial interferometer and a spatial radiometer. Infrared radiation was collected through a cryogenically cooled telescope that was controlled from the flight deck. The principal investigator (PI) for the instrument was Dr. Robert R. O'Neil of the Phillips Laboratory.

=== Far Ultraviolet Cameras ===
The Far Ultraviolet Cameras experiment was to capture imagery and photometry of naturally occurring and man-made emission phenomena such as airglow and diffuse aurora. Secondary missions were to study interplanetary and interstellar objects (such as comets and stars) and to make atmospheric density measurements by stellar occultations. The instrument consisted of two imaging cameras and a low-light-level TV camera mounted on the same base. Like CIRRIS, they were controlled from the flight deck. Dr. George R. Carruthers, then working for the United States Naval Research Laboratory, was the PI for this experiment.

=== Uniformly Redundant Array ===
The Uniformly Redundant Array conducted a technology demonstration of coded aperture imaging in space and the capability to form images without stabilization. The instrument was a wide field-of-view, photon-counting imaging device. Edward E. Fenimore of the Los Alamos National Laboratory was PI for this experiment.

=== Gamma Ray Advanced Detector ===
GRAD was another technology demonstration program to test the suitability of bismuth germanate in gamma-ray detectors, the suitability of n-type, high-purity germanium gamma-ray detectors for space, the performance of an advanced gamma-ray spectrometer and to study the gamma ray background around the shuttle, as well as the gamma-ray spectrum of the sun and the Galactic Center. The instrument is non-steerable and is pointed by moving the Shuttle. Dr. C. Rester from the University of Florida was the PI.

=== Horizon Ultraviolet Program ===
The Horizon Ultraviolet Program (HUP) demonstrated the ability to measure the spatial and spectral characteristics of the Earth's horizon in the vacuum ultraviolet wavelength. The sensor was an Ebert-Fastie spectrometer telescope. Francis Leblanc and Robert E. Huffman of the Phillips Laboratory were Principal Investigators.

=== Quadrupole Ion Neutral Mass Spectrograph ===
The Quadrupole Ion Neutral Mass Spectrograph was designed to support the CIRRIS 1A experiment by providing positive ion and neutral contaminant species identifications, concentrations, and temporal variabilities. The sensor package was made up of an electron impact ion source, an ion-focusing grid system, a set of quadrupole rods, and an electron multiplier. Dr. Edmond Tryczinski of Phillips Laboratory was the PI.
