= Charles L. Veach =

American astronaut and fighter pilot (1944-1995)

Charles Veach
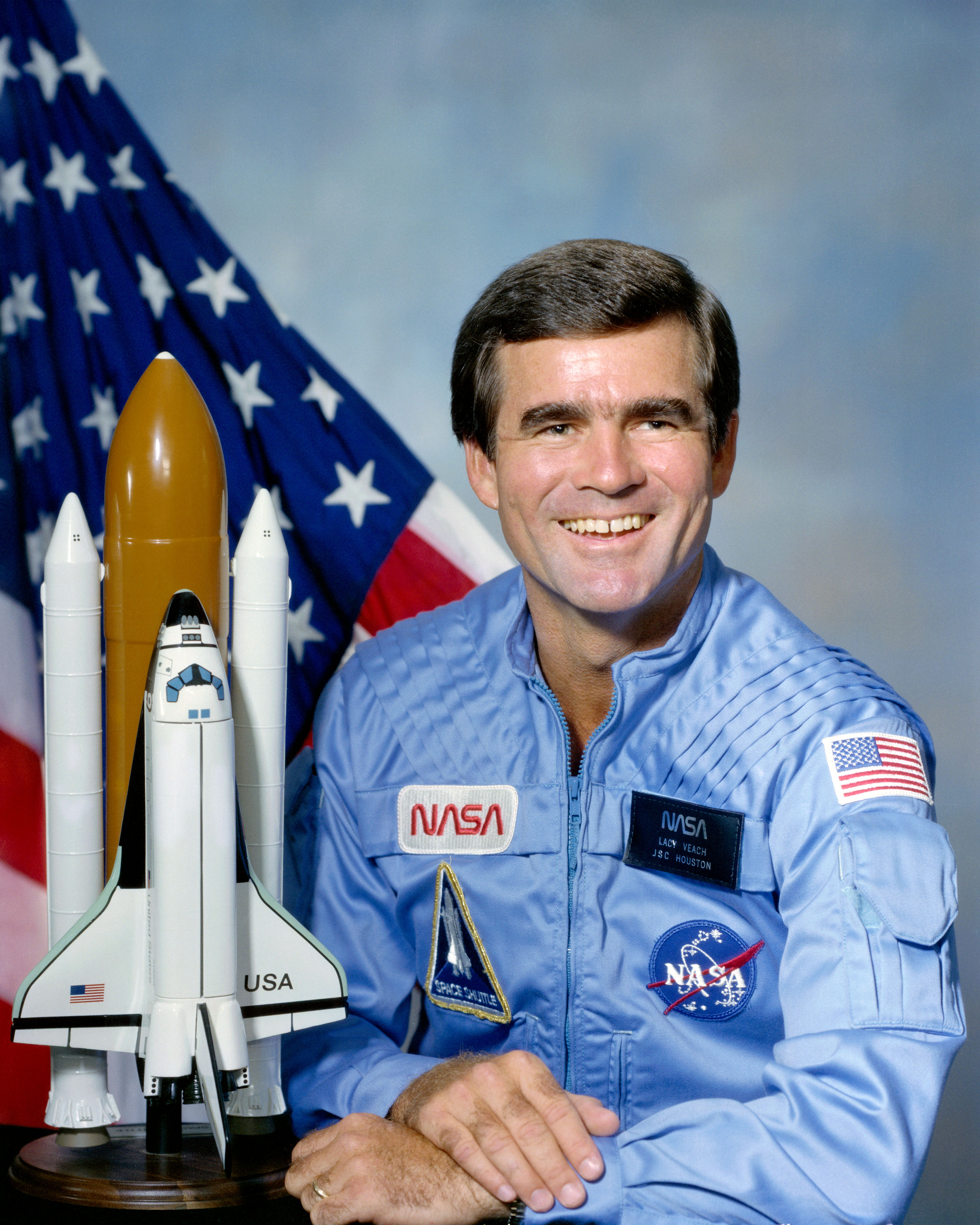
- Veach in 1984
- Born: Charles Lacy Veach; September 18, 1944; Chicago, Illinois, U.S.
- Died: October 3, 1995 (aged 51); Houston, Texas, U.S.
- Education: United States Air Force Academy (BS)
- Space career

NASA astronaut
- Rank: Colonel, USAF
- Time in space: 18d 4h 18m
- Selection: NASA Group 10 (1984)
- Missions: STS-39; STS-52

Charles Lacy Veach (September 18, 1944 – October 3, 1995) was a United States Air Force (USAF) fighter pilot and NASA astronaut.

== Personal data ==
Veach was born September 18, 1944, in Chicago, Illinois, but considered Honolulu, Hawaii, to be his hometown. He was married to Alice Meigs Scott of Waycross, Georgia, they had two children. He enjoyed surfing, bicycling, reading and activities with his family. His parents reside in Honolulu, Hawaii. He was also known as Lacy Veach.

== Education ==
- 1962: Graduated from Punahou School, Honolulu, Hawaii
- 1966: Received a Bachelor of Science degree in Engineering Management from the United States Air Force Academy

== Special honors ==
- Distinguished Flying Cross with 2 Oak Leaf Clusters
- Air Medal with 13 Oak Leaf Clusters
- Air Force Commendation Medal with 1 Oak Leaf Cluster
- Purple Heart

== Experience ==
Veach was commissioned in the United States Air Force upon graduation from the United States Air Force Academy. He received his pilot wings at Moody Air Force Base, Georgia, in 1967, and then attended fighter gunnery school at Luke Air Force Base, Arizona. Over the next 14 years, he served as a USAF fighter pilot, flying the F-100 Super Sabre, the F-111 Aardvark, and the F-105 Thunderchief, on assignments in the United States, Europe, and the Far East, including a 275-mission combat tour in South Vietnam during the Vietnam War. In 1976 and 1977, he was a member of the USAF Air Demonstration Squadron, the Thunderbirds, flying the T-38 Talon. Veach left active duty in 1981 but continued to fly fighters as an F-4 Phantom and F-16 Fighting Falcon pilot with the 147th Fighter Group, later 147th Fighter Wing, of the Texas Air National Guard. His name still adorns the museum display F-16 just inside the front gate of the Ellington Field Joint Reserve Base in Houston, Texas.

He had logged over 5,000 flying hours.

== NASA experience ==
Veach came to work for NASA in January 1982 as an engineer and research pilot at the Johnson Space Center in Houston, Texas. His primary duty was as an instructor pilot in the Shuttle Training Aircraft, the highly modified Gulfstream II used to train astronaut pilots to land the Space Shuttle.

Veach was selected as an astronaut candidate in May 1984 and became an astronaut in June 1985. He held a variety of technical assignments, and had flown as a mission specialist on two Space Shuttle missions, STS-39 in 1991 and STS-52 in 1992. He had logged 436.3 hours in space. Most recently, Lacy had worked as the lead astronaut for the development and operation of robotics for the International Space Station.

On STS-39, Veach was responsible for operating a group of instruments which included an ultraviolet astronomical camera, an x-ray telescope, and a liquid helium-cooled infrared telescope which performed landmark observations of the Earth's atmosphere and the Aurora Australis (the Southern Lights). The 8-day unclassified Department of Defense mission aboard the Orbiter Discovery launched from the Kennedy Space Center in Florida on April 28, 1991, and landed at Kennedy on May 6, 1991.

STS-52 was a 10-day mission aboard the Orbiter Columbia during which the crew successfully deployed the Laser Geodynamic Satellite (LAGEOS), a joint Italian-American project. They also operated the first U.S. Microgravity Payload (USMP) with French and American experiments. Veach was the primary Remote Manipulator System (RMS) operator on the mission, supporting the initial flight tests of the Canadian-built Space Vision System (SVS). STS-52 launched from the Kennedy Space Center in Florida on October 22, 1992, and landed at Kennedy on November 1, 1992.

Gravesite of Charles Lacy Veach

Lacy Veach died in Houston, Texas, on October 3, 1995, of cancer. He is interred at the National Memorial Cemetery of the Pacific in Honolulu, Hawaii.
