= Critical ionization velocity =

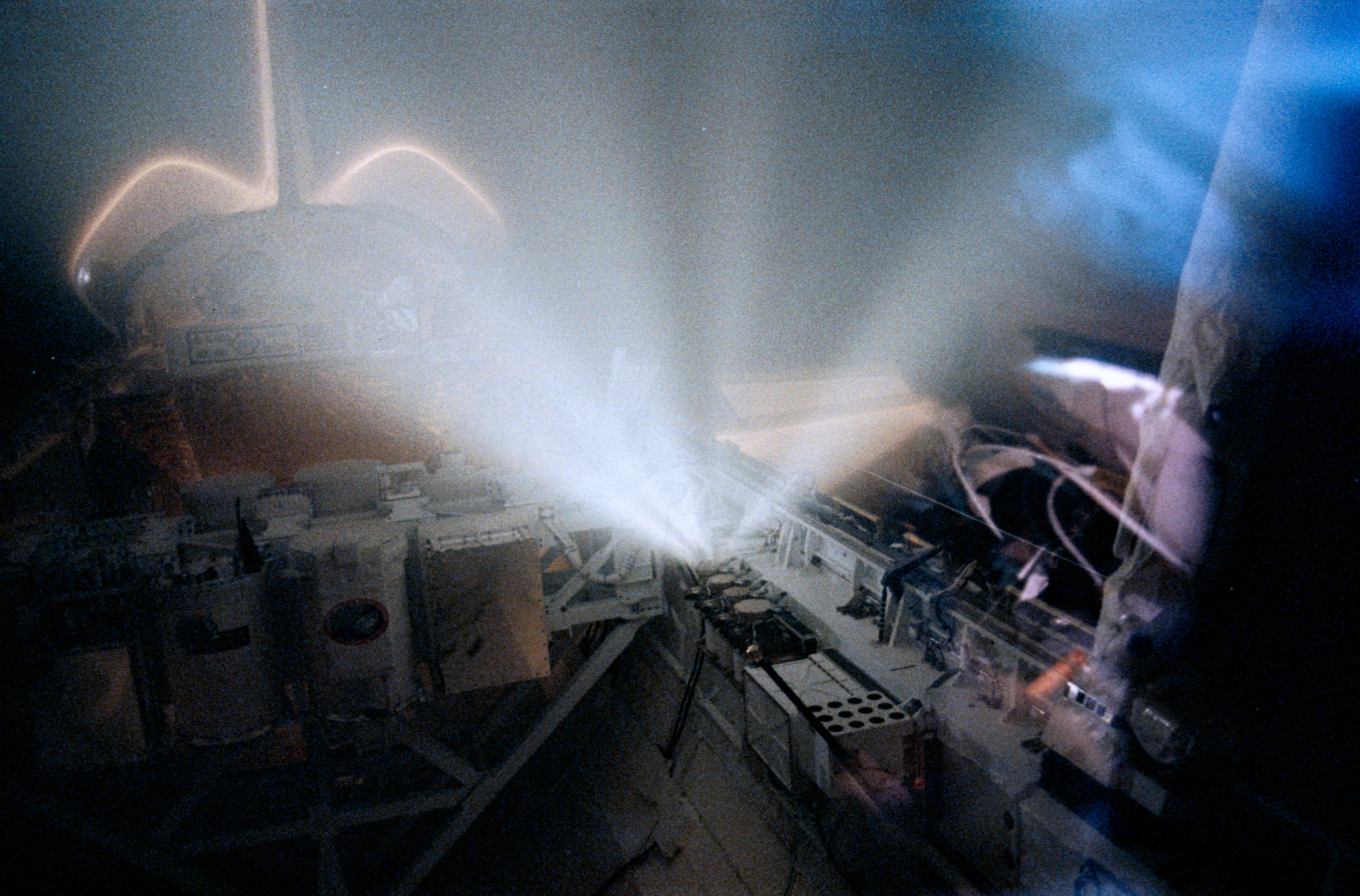
Critical ionization velocity experiment onboard space shuttle Discovery (STS-39), releasing a plume of nitrous oxide gas. Full text

Critical ionization velocity (CIV), or critical velocity (CV), is the relative velocity between a neutral gas and plasma (an ionized gas), at which the neutral gas will start to ionize. If more energy is supplied, the velocity of the atoms or molecules will not exceed the critical ionization velocity until the gas becomes almost fully ionized.

The phenomenon was predicted by Swedish engineer and plasma scientist, Hannes Alfvén, in connection with his model on the origin of the Solar System (1942). At the time, no known mechanism was available to explain the phenomenon, but the theory was subsequently demonstrated in the laboratory. Subsequent research by Brenning and Axnäs (1988) have suggested that a lower hybrid plasma instability is involved in transferring energy from the larger ions to electrons so that they have sufficient energy to ionize. Application of the theory to astronomy through a number of experiments have produced mixed results.

== Experimental research ==
The Royal Institute of Technology in Stockholm carried out the first laboratory tests, and found that (a) the relative velocity between a plasma and neutral gas could be increased to the critical velocity, but then additional energy put into the system went into ionizing the neutral gas, rather than into increasing the relative velocity, (b) the critical velocity is roughly independent of the pressure and magnetic field.

In 1973, Lars Danielsson published a review of critical ionization velocity, and concluded that the existence of the phenomenon "is proved by sufficient experimental evidence". In 1976, Alfvén reported that "The first observation of the critical velocity effect under cosmic conditions was reported by Manka et al. (1972) from the Moon. When an abandoned lunar [391] excursion module was made to impact on the dark side of the Moon not very far from the terminator, a gas cloud was produced which when it had expanded so that it was hit by the solar wind gave rise to superthermal electrons."

In the laboratory, critical ionization velocity has been recognised for some time, and is seen in the penumbra produced by a dense plasma focus device (or plasma gun). Its existence in cosmic plasmas has not been confirmed.

In 1986, Gerhard Haerendel, suggested that critical velocity ionization may stabilize the plasma flow in a cometary coma,. In 1992, E. Golbraikh and M. Filippov argued that critical ionization velocity could play a role in coronal mass ejections and solar flares, and in 1992, Anthony Peratt and Gerrit Verschuur suggested that interstellar neutral hydrogen emissions bore the signature of critical velocity ionization.

A 2001 review of the phenomenon by Shu T. Lai reports that ".. laboratory experiments, and computer simulations have all shown CIV as feasible and reasonably understood, although all CIV experiments in space have yielded negative results with perhaps three exceptions".

Also in 2001, C. Konz, et al., ".. discuss the critical velocity effect as a possible explanation for the observed Hα emission [..] in the Galactic halo near the edges of cold gas clouds of the Magellanic Stream"

== Theory development ==
Typical Critical Ionization Velocities (After Alfvén (1976))
Element	Ionization potential V_{ion} (V)	Average atomic mass	Critical Velocity V_{crit} (10^{3} m/s)
Hydrogen	13.5	1.0	50.9
Helium	24.5	4.0	34.3
Neon	21.5	20.2	14.3
Nitrogen	14.5	14.0	14.1
Carbon	11.2	12.0	13.4
Oxygen	13.5	16.0	12.7

Mathematically, the critical ionization velocity of a neutral cloud, that is, when the cloud begins to become ionized, is when the relative kinetic energy is equal to the ionization energy, that is:

$$\frac{1}{2} mv^2 = eV_{ion}$$

where eV_{ion} is the ionization potential of the atoms or molecules in the gas cloud, m is the mass, v is the velocity. The phenomenon is also called the Critical velocity ionization, and also Critical velocity effect.

Alfvén considered a neutral gas cloud entering the Solar System, and noted that a neutral atom will fall towards the Sun under the influence of gravity, and its kinetic energy will increase. If their motion is random, collisions will cause the gas temperature to rise, so that at a certain distance from the Sun, the gas will ionize. Alfvén writes that the ionization potential of the gas, V_{ion}, occurs when:

$$eV_{ion} = E_g = \frac{k M m}{r}$$

that is, at a distance of:

$$r_{i} = E_g = \frac{k M m}{eV_{ion}} = 6.9\cdot 10^{-20}M \frac{m'}{V_{ion}} = 13.5\cdot 10^{13} \frac{m'}{V_{ion}} cm$$

(where r_{i} is the ion distance from the Sun of mass M, m' is the atom weight, V_{ion} is in volts, k is the gravitational constant). Then when the gas becomes ionized, electromagnetic forces come into effect, of which the most important is the magnetic force which is usually greater than the gravitational force which gives rise to a magnetic repulsion from the Sun. In other words, a neutral gas falling from infinity toward the Sun is stopped at a distance r_{i} where it will accumulate, and perhaps condense into planets.

Alfvén found that by taking a gas cloud with an average ionisation voltage of 12 V, and average atomic weight of 7, then the distance r_{i} is found to coincide with the orbit of Jupiter.

The critical ionization velocity of hydrogen 50.9 × 10^{5} cm/s (50.9 km/s), and helium is 34.3 × 10 ^{5} cm/s (34.3 km/s).

=== Background ===
Alfvén discusses his thoughts behind critical velocity, in his NASA publications Evolution of the Solar System. After criticising the "Inadequacy of the Homogeneous Disc Theory", he writes:

".. it is more attractive to turn to the alternative that the secondary bodies derive from matter falling in from "infinity" (a distance large compared to. the satellite orbit). This matter (after being stopped and given sufficient angular momentum) accumulates at specific distances from the central body. Such a process may take place when atoms or molecules in free fall reach a kinetic energy equal to their ionization energy. At this stage, the gas can become ionized by the process discussed in sec. 21.4; the ionized gas can then be stopped by the magnetic field of the central body and receive angular momentum by transfer from the central body as described in sec. 16.3.".

== Notes ==
=== Other references ===
- Brenning, N .
  - A comparison between laboratory and space experiments on Alfven's CIV effect, in IEEE Transactions on Plasma Science (ISSN 0093-3813), vol. 20, no. 6, p. 778-786. (1996)
  - Review of the CIV phenomenon, in Space Science Reviews (ISSN 0038-6308), vol. 59, Feb. 1992, p. 209-314. (1992)
  - Limits on the magnetic field strength for critical ionization velocity interaction, Physics of Fluids -- November 1985—Volume 28, Issue 11, pp. 3424–3426
