= STS-39 =

1991 American crewed spaceflight for the Department of Defense

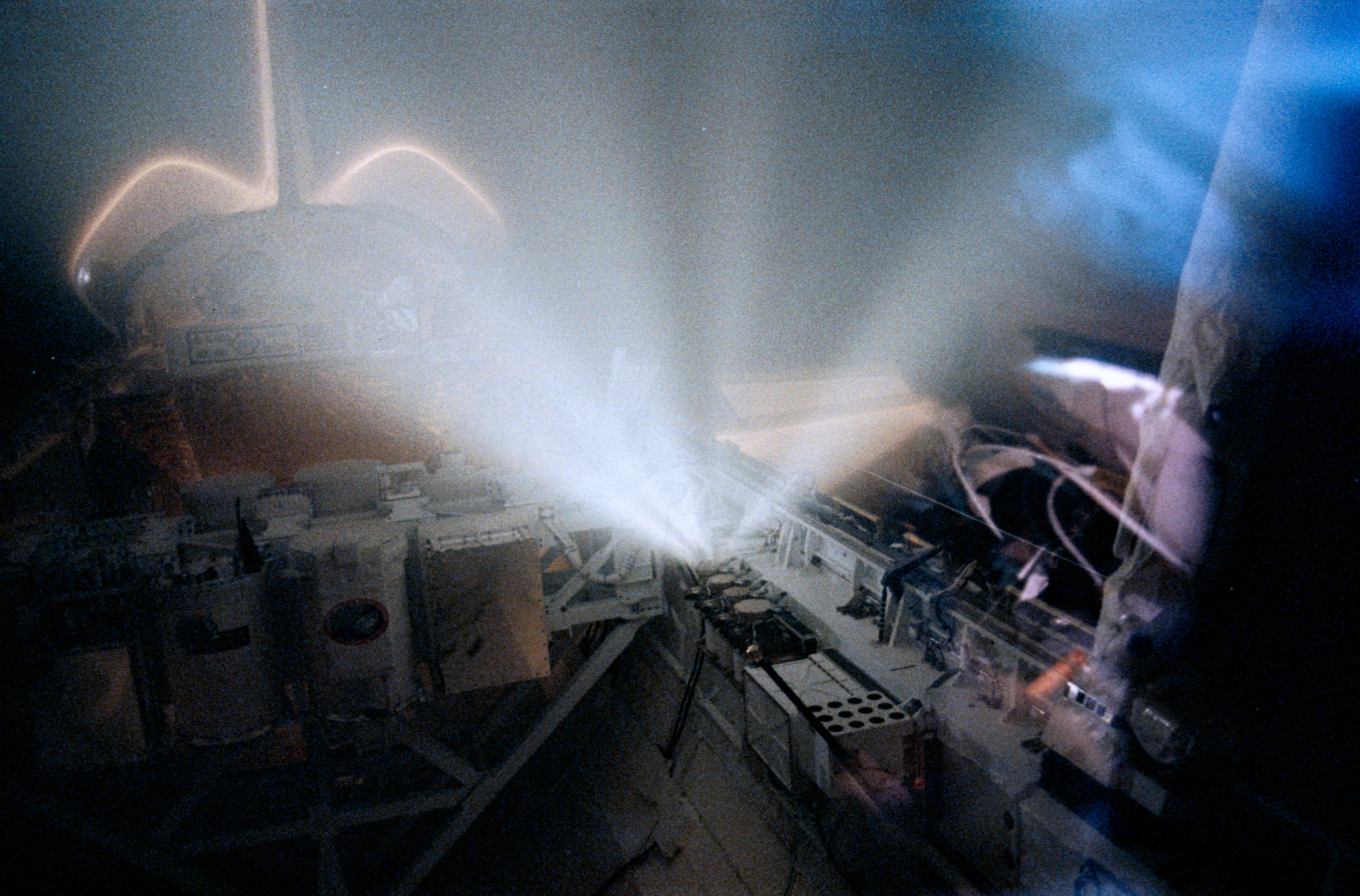
- The Critical ionization velocity (CIV) experiment in Discovery's payload bay
- Names: Space Transportation System-39
- Mission type: DoD research
- Operator: NASA
- COSPAR ID: 1991-031A
- SATCAT no.: 21242
- Mission duration: 8 days, 7 hours, 22 minutes, 23 seconds
- Distance travelled: 5,584,423 km (3,470,000 mi)
- Orbits completed: 134

Spacecraft properties
- Spacecraft: Space Shuttle Discovery
- Launch mass: 112,207 kg (247,374 lb)
- Landing mass: 102,755 kg (226,536 lb)
- Payload mass: 5,663 kg (12,485 lb)

Crew
- Crew size: 7
- Members: Michael L. Coats; L. Blaine Hammond; Gregory J. Harbaugh; Donald R. McMonagle; Guion Bluford; Charles L. Veach; Richard Hieb

Start of mission
- Launch date: April 28, 1991, 11:33:14 UTC (7:33:14 am EDT)
- Launch site: Kennedy, LC-39A
- Contractor: Rockwell International

End of mission
- Landing date: May 6, 1991, 18:55:37 UTC (2:55:37 pm EDT)
- Landing site: Kennedy, SLF Runway 15

Orbital parameters
- Reference system: Geocentric orbit
- Regime: Low Earth orbit
- Perigee altitude: 248 km (154 mi)
- Apogee altitude: 263 km (163 mi)
- Inclination: 57.01°
- Period: 89.60 minutes

Instruments
- Air Force Program-675 (AFP-675); Chemical Release Observation (CRO); Cryogenic Infrared Radiance Instrumentation for Shuttle (CIRRIS); Cloud Logic to Optimize Use of Defense Systems (CLOUDS-1A); Infrared Background Signature Survey (IBSS); Multi-Purpose Release Canister (MPEC); Shuttle pallet satellite (SPAS-II); Space Test Program (STP-01); Radiation Monitoring Equipment (RME-III)
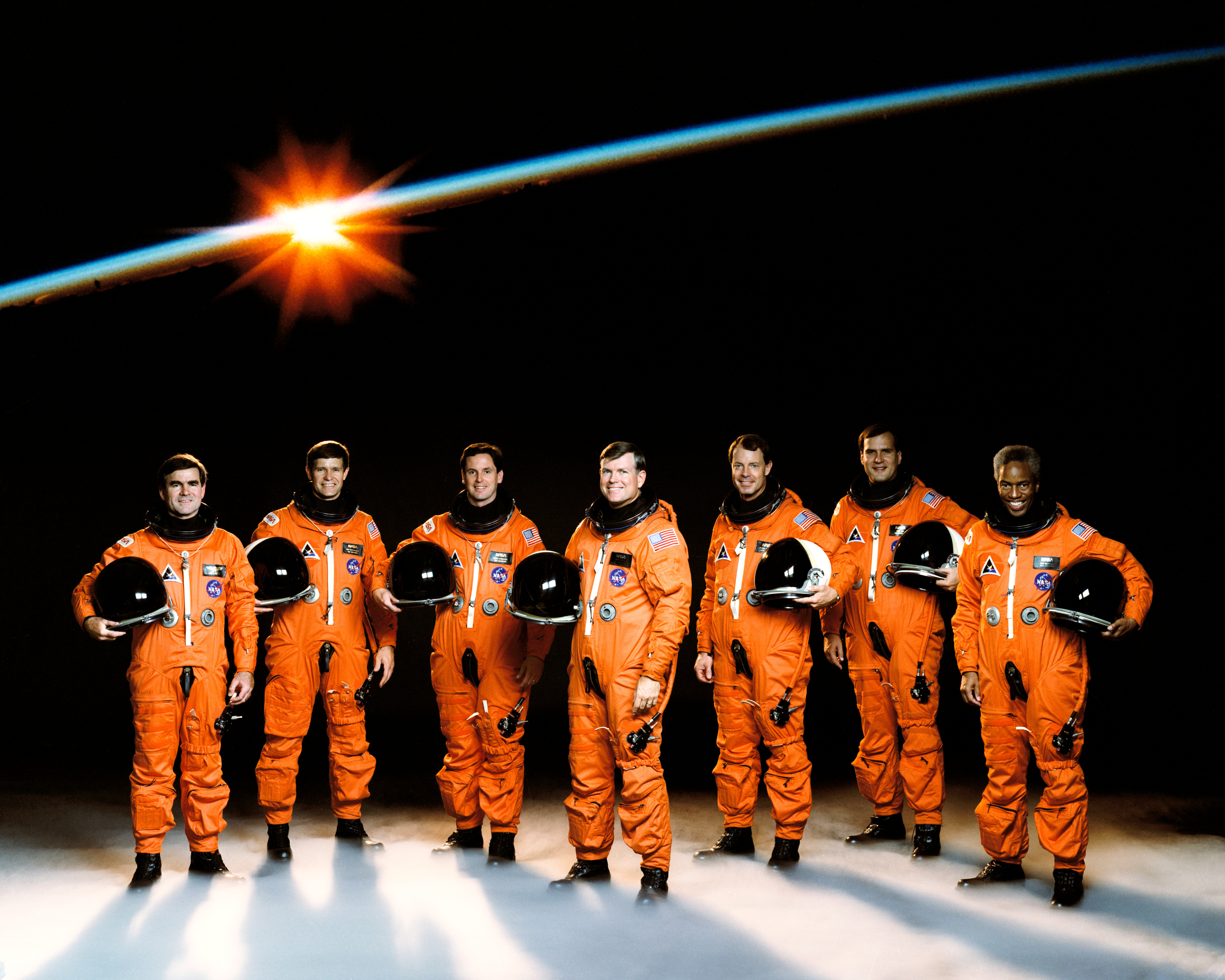
- STS-39 mission patch From left: Veach, Coats, Harbaugh, McMonagle, Hammond, Hieb and Bluford Space Shuttle program

STS-39 was the twelfth mission of the NASA Space Shuttle Discovery, and the 40th orbital shuttle mission overall. The primary purpose of the mission was to conduct a variety of payload experiments for the U.S. Department of Defense (DoD).

== Crew ==
Position	Astronaut
Commander	Michael Coats; Third and last spaceflight
Pilot	L. Blaine Hammond; First spaceflight
Mission Specialist 1	Gregory J. Harbaugh; First spaceflight
Mission Specialist 2 Flight Engineer	Donald R. McMonagle; First spaceflight
Mission Specialist 3	Guion Bluford; Third spaceflight
Mission Specialist 4	Charles L. Veach; First spaceflight
Mission Specialist 5	Richard Hieb; First spaceflight

=== Crew seat assignments ===
Seat	Launch	Landing	Seats 1–4 are on the flight deck. Seats 5–7 are on the mid-deck.
1	Coats		Seats 1–4 are on the flight deck. Seats 5–7 are on the mid-deck.
2	Hammond		Seats 1–4 are on the flight deck. Seats 5–7 are on the mid-deck.
3	Harbaugh	Bluford	Seats 1–4 are on the flight deck. Seats 5–7 are on the mid-deck.
4	McMonagle		Seats 1–4 are on the flight deck. Seats 5–7 are on the mid-deck.
5	Bluford	Harbaugh	Seats 1–4 are on the flight deck. Seats 5–7 are on the mid-deck.
6	Veach		Seats 1–4 are on the flight deck. Seats 5–7 are on the mid-deck.
7	Hieb		Seats 1–4 are on the flight deck. Seats 5–7 are on the mid-deck.

== Mission highlights ==
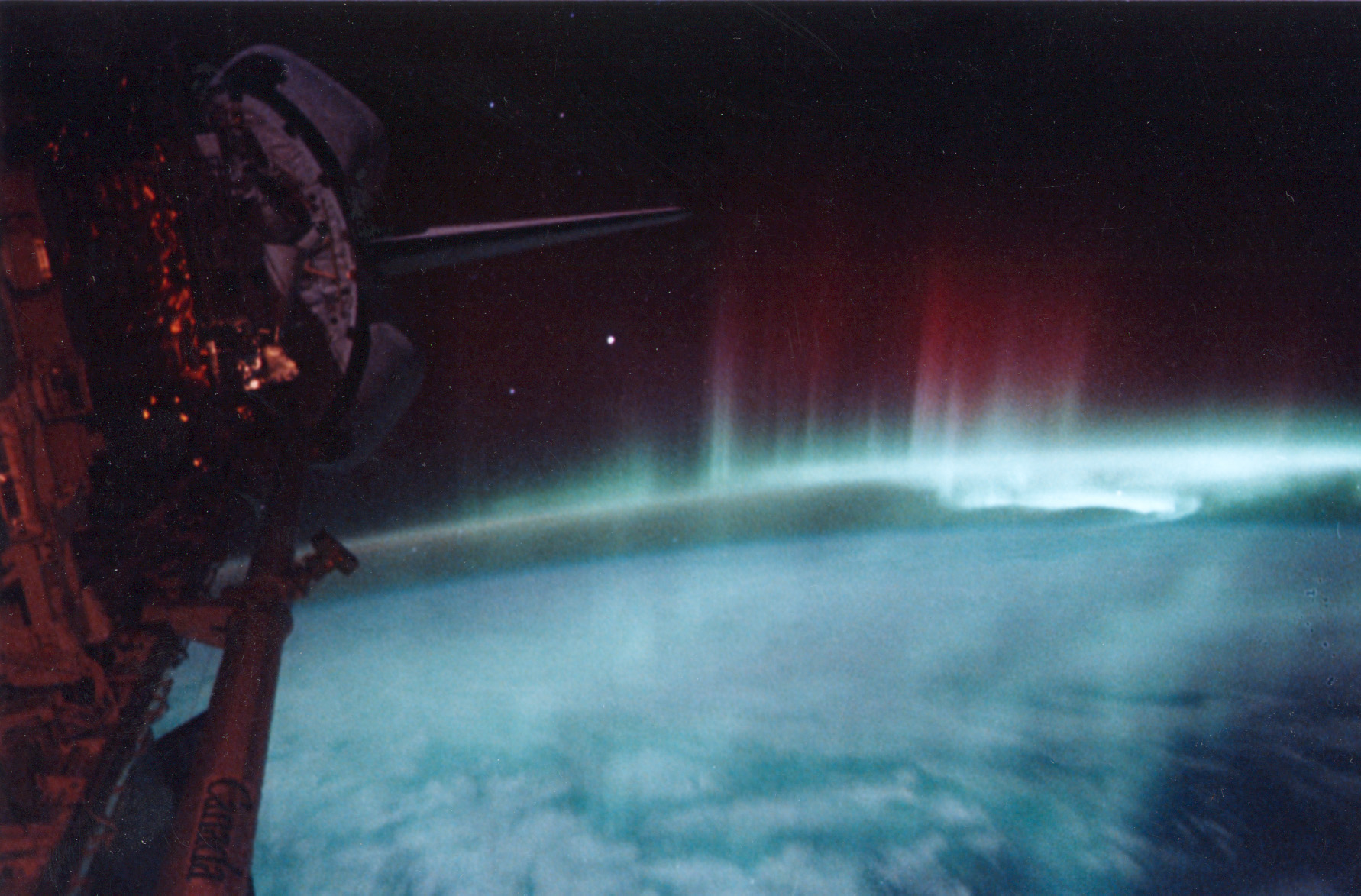
STS-39 observing Aurora australis.

Attempt	Planned	Result	Turnaround	Reason	Decision point	Weather go (%)	Notes
1	23 Apr 1991, 7:05:00 am	Scrubbed	—	Technical	23 Apr 1991, 2:15 am (T−05:30:00)	80	HPOTP transducer failure.
2	28 Apr 1991, 7:33:14 am	Success	5 days 0 hours 28 minutes			90	T−9 minute hold extended for 32 minutes due to OPS 2 recorder problem.

Launch was originally scheduled for March 9, 1991, but during processing work at Pad LC-39A, significant cracks were found on all four lug hinges on the two external tank umbilical door drive mechanisms. NASA managers opted to roll back the vehicle to the Vehicle Assembly Building (VAB) on March 7, 1991, and then to Orbiter Processing Facility (OPF) for repair. The faulty hinges were replaced with units taken from orbiter Columbia, and reinforced. Discovery was returned to the pad on April 1, 1991, and the launch was rescheduled for April 23. The mission was again postponed when, during prelaunch external tank loading, a transducer on high-pressure oxidizer turbopump for main engine number three showed readings out of specification. The transducer and its cable harness were replaced and tested. The launch was rescheduled for April 28. Actual launch occurred at April 28, 1991, 7:33:14 a.m. EDT. Launch weight: 112,207 kg (247,374 lb).

STS-39 was a dedicated U.S. Department of Defense mission. Unclassified payload included Air Force Program-675 (AFP-675); Infrared Background Signature Survey (IBSS) with Critical ionization velocity (CIV), Chemical Release Observation (CRO) and Shuttle pallet satellite-II (SPAS-II) experiments; and Space Test Payload-1 (STP-1). Classified payload consisted of Multi-Purpose Release Canister (MPEC). Also on board was Radiation Monitoring Equipment-III (RME-III) and Cloud Logic to Optimize Use of Defense Systems-1A (CLOUDS-1A).

STS-39 was the first unclassified Department of Defense (DoD)-dedicated Space Shuttle mission. There had previously been seven Shuttle missions dedicated to the DoD, but those were considered classified and information about the operation or success of the payloads or experiments was not released. For STS-39, only the payload in the Multi-Purpose Experiment Canister (MPEC) was listed as classified. (Bluford reportedly launched the classified payload by himself while, according to another member of the crew, "the rest of us pretended not to notice".)

The crew was divided into two teams for around-the-clock operations. Among other activities, the crew made observations of the atmosphere and gas releases, Discovery's orbital environment, and firings of the orbiter's engines, in wavelengths ranging from infrared to far ultraviolet. As part of the sophisticated experiments, five spacecraft or satellites were deployed from the payload bay, and one was retrieved later during the mission.

Carried in the orbiter's cargo bay were: Air Force Program-675 (AFP-675); Infrared Background Signature Survey (IBSS); Space Test Program-01 (STP-01); and the MPEC. Inside the crew cabin were the Cloud Logic to Optimize the Use of Defense Systems-1A (CLOUDS-1A) experiment and the Radiation Monitoring Equipment-III (RME-III).

The Remote Manipulator System (Canadarm) in the payload bay was used to deploy the Shuttle Pallet Satellite-II (SPAS-II), on which the IBSS was mounted. Among other observations, the SPAS-II/IBSS watched Discovery as it performed some orbital maneuvers including the "Malarkey Milkshake". The deployment of IBSS was delayed a day, until Flight Day Four, to give priority to the completion of the CIRRIS (Cryogenic Infrared Radiance Instrumentation for Shuttle) experiment which was depleting its liquid helium coolant supply faster than expected while making observations of auroral and airglow emissions.

As usual, crew members faced some unexpected challenges during the mission. After working only about four hours, two tape recorders could not be reactivated. The tape recorders were designed to record observations made by three instruments on AFP-675. In a complicated two-hour bypass repair operation, the astronauts had to route wires and attach a splice wire to a Ku-band antenna system so the data could be sent directly to a ground station.

The high orbital inclination of the mission, 57.01° with respect to the equator, allowed the crew to fly over most of Earth's large land masses and observe and record environmental resources and problem areas.

STS-39 landed on May 6, 1991, at 2:55:35 p.m. EDT, at Runway 15, Kennedy Space Center, Florida. Landing was diverted there because of unacceptably high winds at the planned landing site, Edwards Air Force Base, California. Landing weight: 102,755 kg (226,536 lb). Rollout distance: 2,877 m (9,439 ft), rollout time: 55 seconds.

== Gallery ==
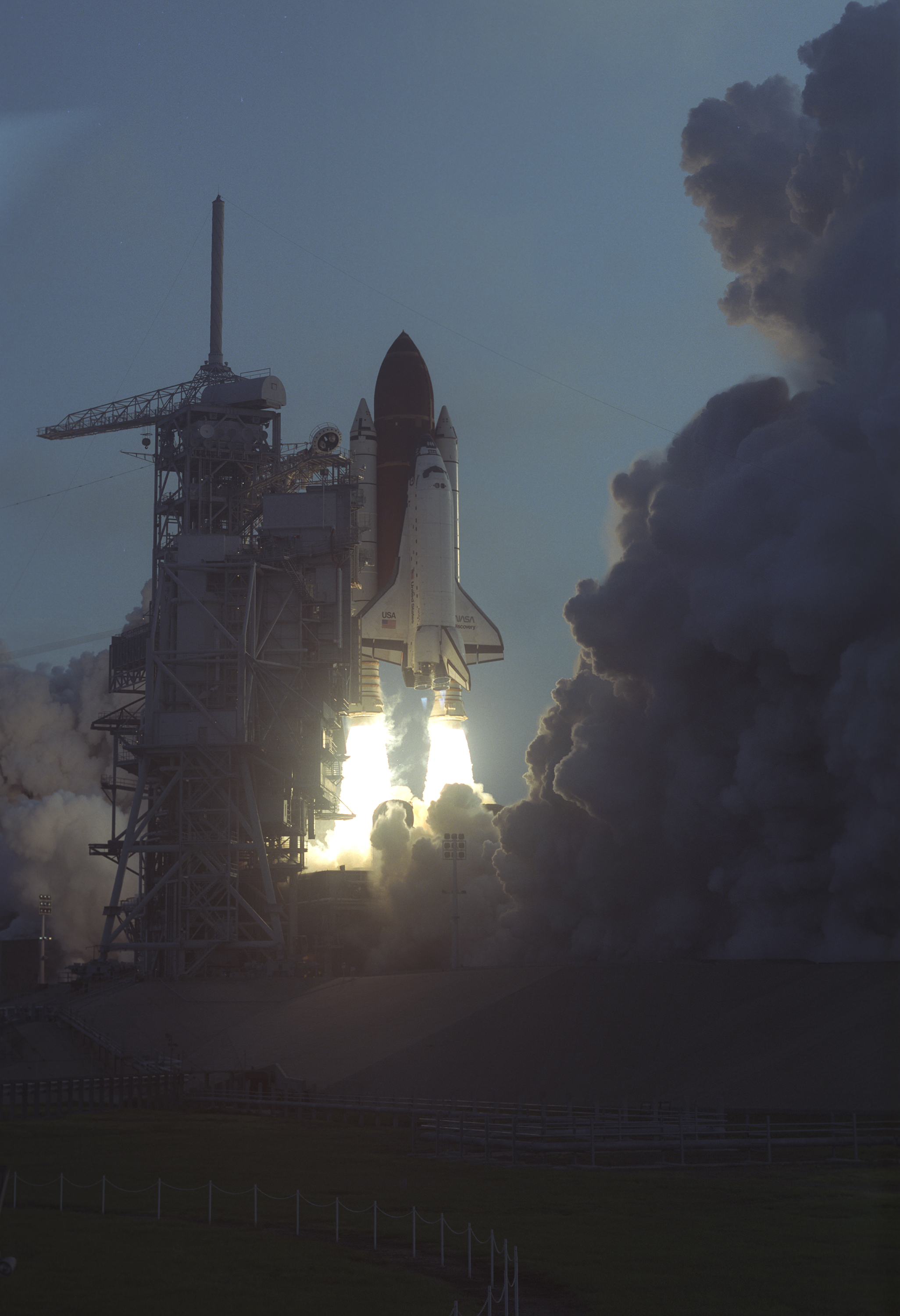
Launch of STS-39

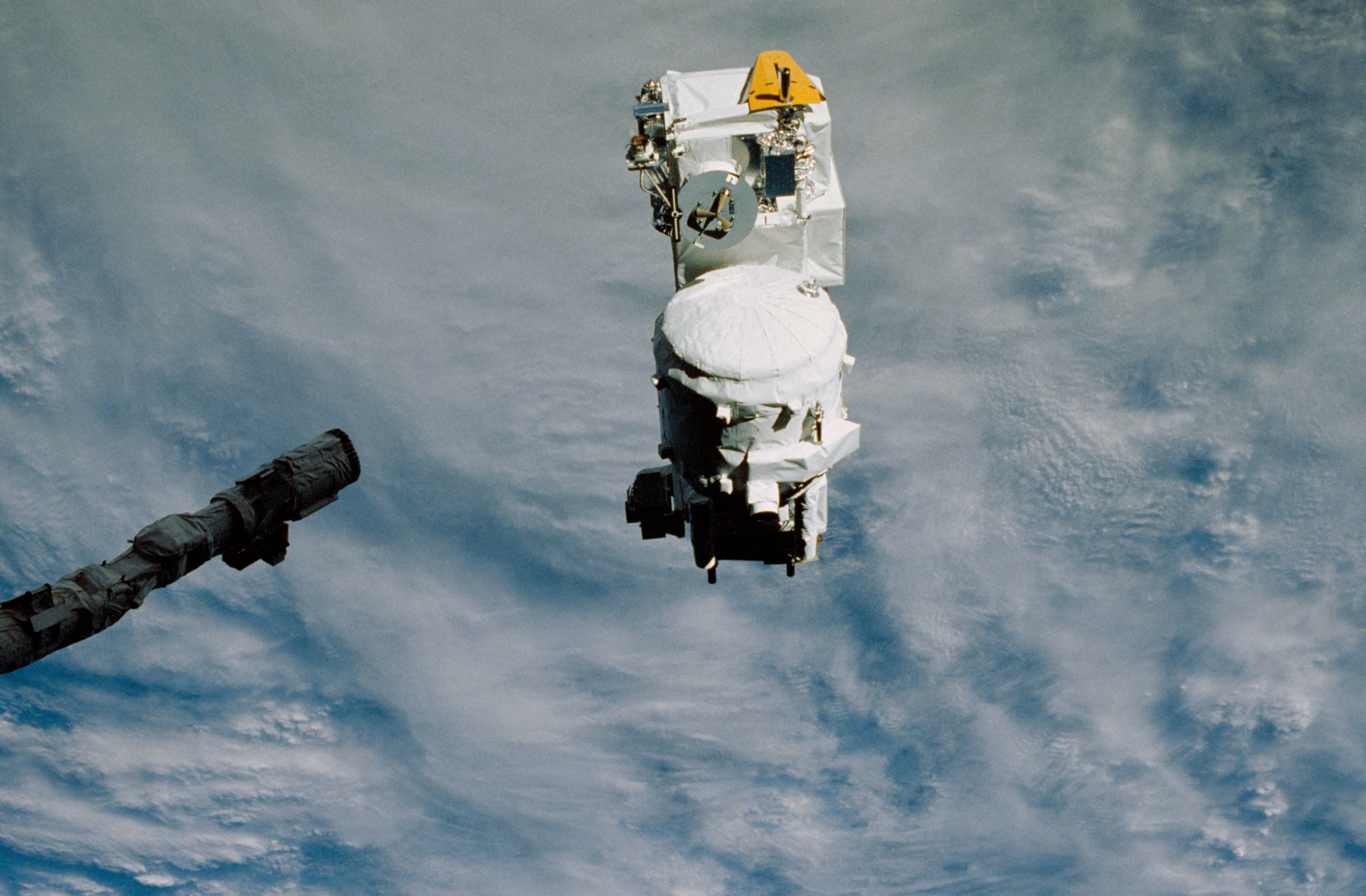
SPAS-II

== See also ==
- List of human spaceflights
- List of Space Shuttle missions
- Militarization of space
- Outline of space science
- Space Shuttle
