= Martin J. Fettman =

American veterinarian and astronaut (born 1956)

Martin Joseph Fettman
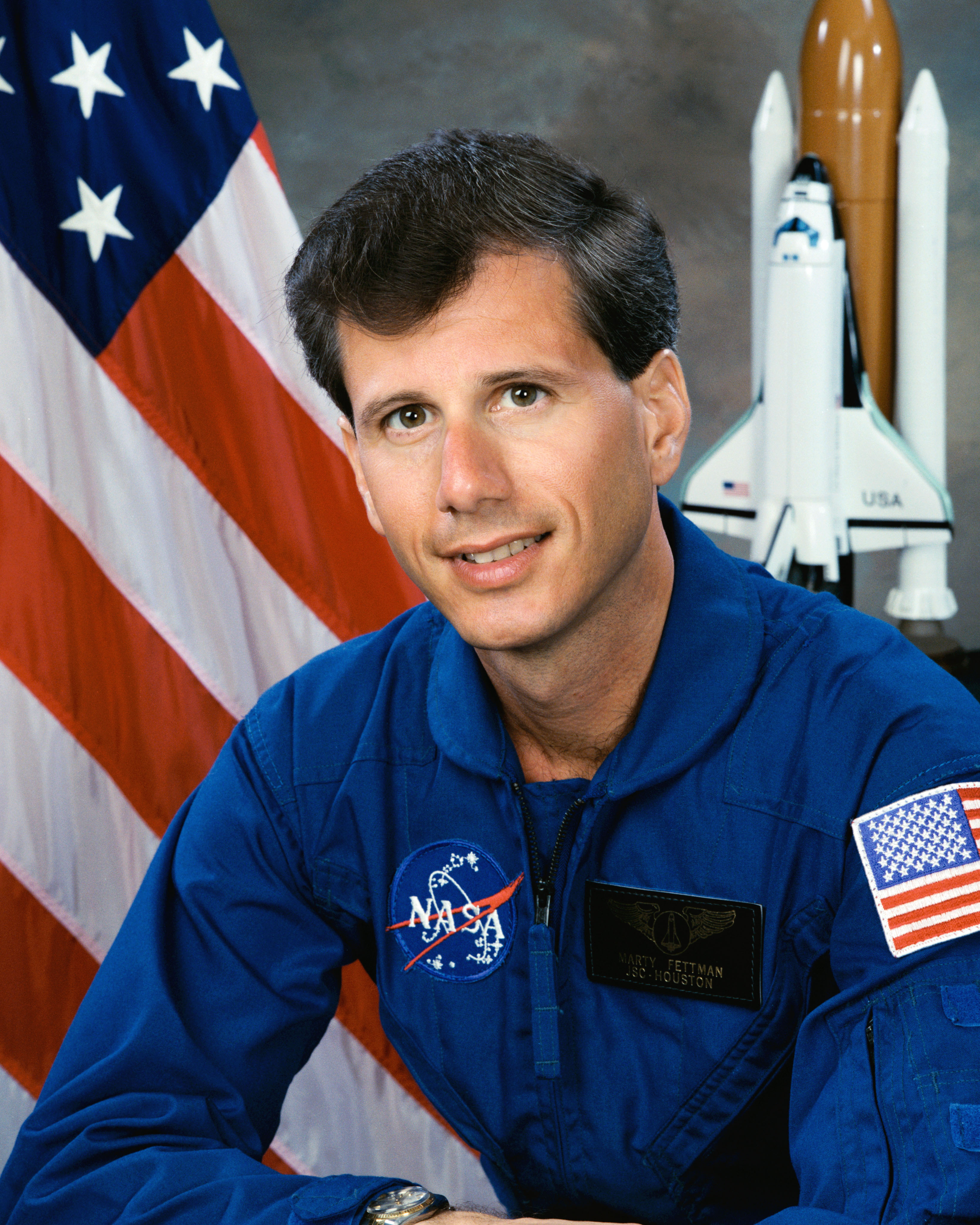
- Born: 31 December 1956 (age 69); Brooklyn, New York, U.S.
- Education: Cornell University (BS, DVM, MS); Colorado State University (PhD)
- Occupations: Veterinarian; Pathologist; academic
- Space career

Payload specialist
- Time in space: 14d 00h 12m
- Missions: STS-58
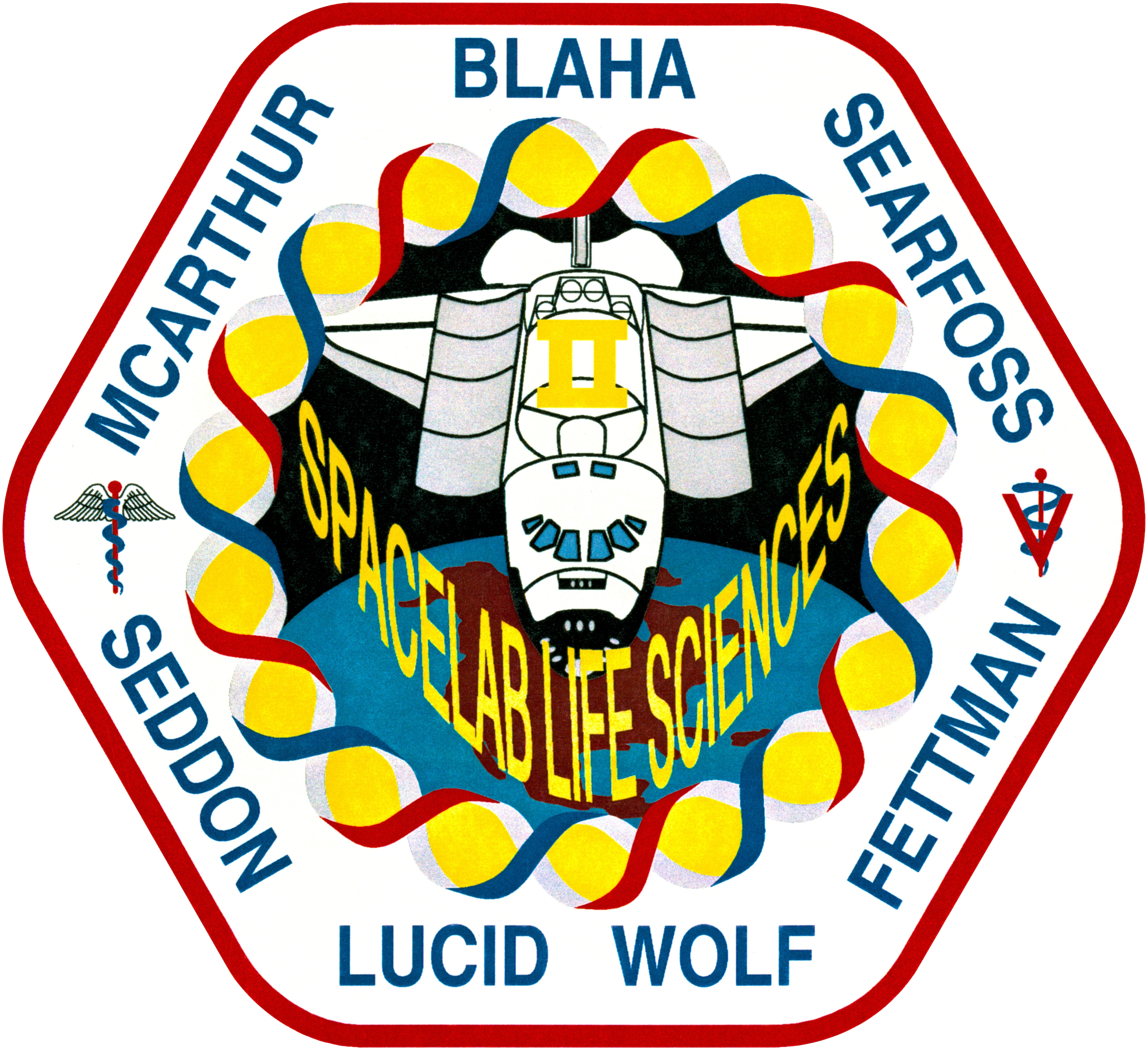
- Mission insignia

Martin Joseph Fettman (born December 31, 1956) is an American veterinarian, pathologist and researcher who flew aboard the Space Shuttle Columbia on mission STS-58 in 1993 as a payload specialist. He was the first veterinarian to fly in space. He joined the faculty of Colorado State University (CSU) and researched the pathophysiology of nutritional and metabolic disease.

== Early life and education ==
Fettman was born on December 31, 1956, in Brooklyn, New York, and graduated from Midwood High School there in 1973. He earned a Bachelor of Science in animal nutrition from Cornell University in 1976, and both a Doctor of Veterinary Medicine and a Master of Science in nutrition from Cornell in 1980. He received a Doctor of Philosophy in physiology from Colorado State University in 1982. In 1984, he obtained board certification in veterinary clinical pathology, becoming a diplomate of the American College of Veterinary Pathologists.

== Academic career ==
Fettman joined the faculty of CSU's College of Veterinary Medicine and Biomedical Sciences in 1982 as an assistant professor of clinical pathology, and from 1983 held a joint appointment in the Department of Physiology. He was promoted to associate professor in 1986 and in 1988 became section chief of clinical pathology at the university's Veterinary Teaching Hospital. He spent a sabbatical in 1989 as a visiting professor of medicine at The Queen Elizabeth Hospital and the University of Adelaide in South Australia, where he studied the biochemical epidemiology of human colorectal cancer.

In 1991 Fettman was appointed to the Mark L. Morris Chair in Clinical Nutrition and given a joint appointment in the Department of Clinical Sciences, and in 1992 he was promoted to full professor of pathology. He was named a George H. Glover distinguished faculty member of the college, the 1994 Sigma Xi honored scientist at CSU, the 1994 Spencer T. and Ann W. Olin Lecturer at Cornell University, and a 1995 Bard College Distinguished Scientist. He has published more than 100 research articles in peer-reviewed journals.

== NASA career ==
Fettman was selected as a NASA payload specialist candidate in December 1991, one of three finalists alongside the physician Jay C. Buckey and the engineer Laurence R. Young for a single payload specialist seat on the second Spacelab Life Sciences mission (SLS-2). In October 1992, he was named the prime payload specialist, making him the first professional veterinarian assigned to a spaceflight; Buckey and Young served as alternates.

=== STS-58 ===
Fettman flew on STS-58, which launched aboard Columbia from Kennedy Space Center on October 18, 1993. The mission was the second dedicated Spacelab Life Sciences flight, on which the seven-member crew conducted 14 experiments on the cardiovascular, pulmonary, regulatory, neurovestibular and musculoskeletal systems, serving as both operators and test subjects. The crew also included commander John E. Blaha, pilot Richard A. Searfoss, payload commander M. Rhea Seddon, and mission specialists William S. McArthur, David A. Wolf and Shannon M. Lucid. At just under 14 days, it was the longest Space Shuttle flight up to that time.

As a subject, Fettman took part in vestibular experiments using a rotating chair operated by Seddon, and, with Lucid, volunteered to have a catheter threaded through an arm vein into the heart to measure changes in central venous pressure caused by the fluid shift of weightlessness. Six of the experiments used 48 laboratory rats housed aboard the Spacelab module; Seddon, a surgeon by training, assigned herself and Fettman to carry out in-flight dissections of some of the animals, among the first such procedures performed in space. Columbia landed at Edwards Air Force Base in California on November 1, 1993, after 225 orbits; Fettman was among the crew members who remained at the Dryden Flight Research Center for several days of post-flight data collection.

After the flight, Fettman made more than seventy public appearances on behalf of space life sciences research and visited more than twenty K–12 schools in the United States and Canada, and he served on the NASA Advisory Council's Life and Biomedical Sciences and Applications Advisory Subcommittee.
