= Shannon Lucid =

American biochemist and astronaut (born 1943)

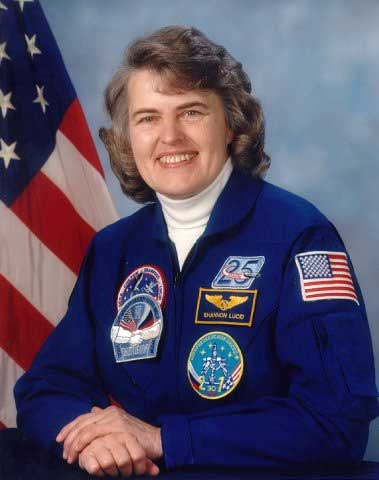
- Lucid c. 2004
- Born: Shannon Matilda Wells; January 14, 1943 (age 83); Shanghai, Republic of China
- Education: Wheaton College; University of Oklahoma (BS, MS, PhD)
- Awards: Congressional Space Medal of Honor; NASA Distinguished Service Medal (2); NASA Exceptional Service Medal (5); NASA Space Flight Medal (6)
- Space career

NASA astronaut
- Time in space: 223 days, 2 hours and 50 minutes
- Selection: NASA Group 8 (1978)
- Missions: STS-51-G; STS-34; STS-43; STS-58; STS-76/STS-79 (Mir EO‑21/22)
- Scientific career
- Thesis: Effect of Cholera Toxin on Phosphorylation and Kinase Activity of Intestinal Epithelial Cells and Their Brush Borders (1973)
- Doctoral advisor: Chadwick Cox

Shannon Matilda Wells Lucid (née Wells; born January 14, 1943) is an American biochemist and retired NASA astronaut. She has flown in space five times, including a prolonged mission aboard the Russian space station Mir in 1996, and is the only American woman to have stayed on Mir. From 1996 to 2007, Lucid held the record for the longest duration spent in space by an American and by a woman. She was awarded the Congressional Space Medal of Honor in December 1996, making her the tenth person and the first woman to be accorded the honor.

Lucid is a graduate of the University of Oklahoma, where she earned a bachelor's degree in chemistry in 1963, a master's degree in biochemistry in 1970, and a PhD in biochemistry in 1973. She was a laboratory technician at the Oklahoma Medical Research Foundation from 1964 to 1966, a research chemist at Kerr-McGee from 1966 to 1968, and a research associate at the Oklahoma Medical Research Foundation from 1973 to 1978.

In 1978, Lucid was recruited by NASA for astronaut training with NASA Astronaut Group 8, the first class of astronauts to include women. She flew in space five times: on STS-51-G, STS-34, STS-43, STS-58, and her mission to Mir, for which Lucid traveled to the space station on Space Shuttle Atlantis with STS-76 and returned six months later with STS-79. She was the NASA Chief Scientist from 2002 to 2003 and a capsule communicator (CAPCOM) at Mission Control for numerous Space Shuttle missions, including STS-135, the final mission of the Space Shuttle program. Lucid announced her retirement from NASA in 2012.

== Early life ==
Shannon Matilda Wells was born in Shanghai, Republic of China, on January 14, 1943, the daughter of Joseph Oscar Wells, a Baptist missionary, and his wife Myrtle, a missionary nurse. Due to America's ongoing war with Japan, when she was six weeks old, the family was detained by the Japanese, who had occupied Shanghai at the time. The three of them were imprisoned in an internment camp but were released during a prisoner exchange later that year. They returned to the United States on the Swedish ocean liner MS Gripsholm and stayed in the US until the end of the war.

After the war ended, the family returned to China but decided to leave again after the Chinese Communist Revolution in 1949. They moved to Lubbock, Texas, and then settled in Bethany, Oklahoma, the family's original hometown, where Wells graduated from Bethany High School in 1960. She was fascinated by stories of the American frontier and wanted to become an explorer. She concluded that she had been born too late for this, but discovered the works of Robert Goddard, the American rocket scientist, and decided that she could become a space explorer. Wells sold her bicycle to buy a telescope so she could look at the stars, and began building her own rockets. Shortly after graduating from high school, Wells earned her private pilot's license with instrument and multi-engine ratings and bought a preowned Piper PA-16 Clipper that she used to fly her father to revival meetings. She applied for jobs as a commercial pilot, but was rejected, as women were not yet accepted for training as commercial pilots in the United States.

Wells attended Wheaton College in Illinois, where she majored in chemistry. She then transferred to the University of Oklahoma, where she earned her bachelor's degree in chemistry in 1963. She was a teaching assistant in the University of Oklahoma's Department of Chemistry from 1963 to 1964 and a senior laboratory technician at the Oklahoma Medical Research Foundation in Oklahoma City, from 1964 to 1966. She then became a research chemist at Kerr-McGee, an oil company there. At Kerr-McGee she met Michael F. Lucid, a fellow research chemist. They married in 1967, and their first child, Kawai Dawn, was born in 1968.

Afterward, Lucid left Kerr-McGee and returned to the University of Oklahoma as graduate assistant in the Department of Biochemistry and Molecular Biology, where she pursued a master's degree in biochemistry. She sat for her final examinations two days after the birth of her second daughter, Shandara Michelle, in 1970. She went on to earn her PhD in biochemistry in 1973, writing her thesis on the Effect of Cholera Toxin on Phosphorylation and Kinase Activity of Intestinal Epithelial Cells and Their Brush Borders under the supervision of A. Chadwick Cox. She then returned to the Oklahoma Medical Research Foundation as a research associate. A third child, Michael Kermit, was born in 1975.

== NASA career ==
=== Selection and training ===
On July 8, 1976, the National Aeronautics and Space Administration (NASA) issued a call for applications for at least 15 pilot candidates and 15 mission specialist candidates. For the first time, new selections would be considered astronaut candidates rather than fully-fledged astronauts until they finished training and evaluation, which was expected to take two years. The enactment of the Equal Employment Opportunity Act of 1972 reinforced the promise of the Civil Rights Act of 1964 to address the persistent and entrenched employment discrimination against women, African Americans and minority groups in American society. While they had never been explicitly precluded from becoming NASA astronauts, none had ever been selected either. This time, minorities and women were encouraged to apply. Lucid's was one of the first of 8,079 applications received.

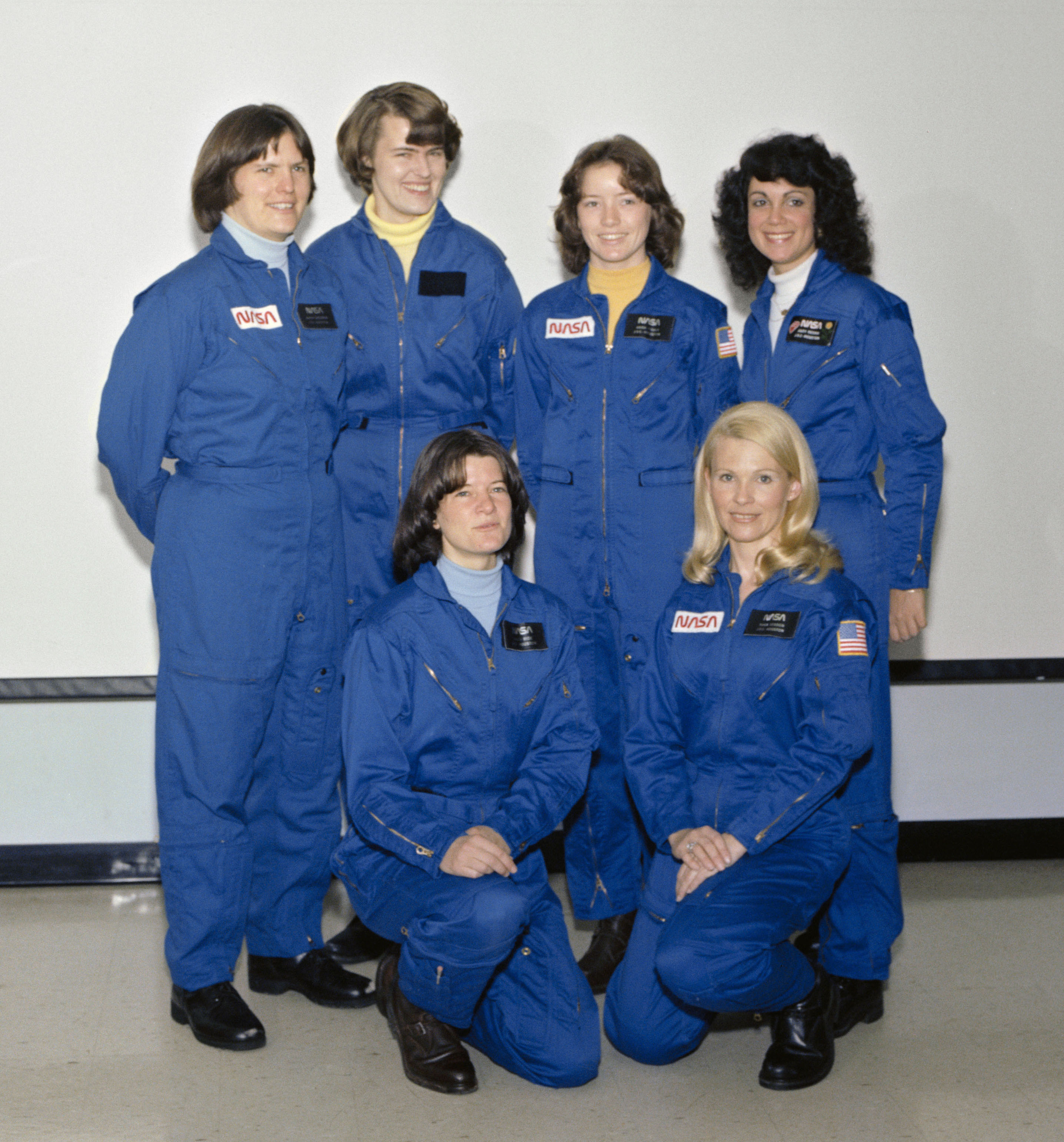
The first NASA women astronauts. Back row, left to right: Kathryn Sullivan, Shannon Lucid, Anna Fisher, Judith Resnik. Front row, left to right: Sally Ride and Rhea Seddon.

As one of 208 finalists, Lucid was invited to come to the Johnson Space Center (JSC) in Houston, Texas, for a week of interviews, evaluations and examinations, commencing on August 29, 1977. She was part of the third group of twenty applicants to be interviewed, and the first one that included women. The eight women in the group included Rhea Seddon, Anna Sims, Nitza Cintron and Millie Hughes-Wiley. On January 16, 1978, NASA announced the names of the 35 successful candidates, of whom 20 were mission specialist candidates. Of the six women in this first class with female astronauts, Lucid was the only one who was a mother at the time of being selected. George Abbey, the Director of Flight Crew Operations at JSC and the chairman of the selection panel, later stated that this was not taken into consideration during the selection process.

Group 8's name for itself was "TFNG". The abbreviation was deliberately ambiguous; for public purposes, it stood for "Thirty-Five New Guys", but within the group itself, it was known to stand for the military phrase, "the fucking new guy", used to denote newcomers to a military unit. Much of the first eight months of their training was in the classroom. Because there were so many of them, the TFNGs did not fit easily into the existing classrooms, so for classroom instruction they were split into two groups, red and blue, led by Rick Hauck and John Fabian respectively. Classroom training was given on a wide variety of subjects, including an introduction to the Space Shuttle program, space flight engineering, astronomy, orbital mechanics, ascent and entry aerodynamics and space flight physiology. Those accustomed to military and academic environments were surprised that subjects were taught, but not tested. Training in geology, a feature of the training of earlier classes, was continued, but the locations visited changed because the focus was now on observations of the Earth rather than the Moon.

Astronaut candidates had to complete survival training, be able to swim and scuba dive, and master the basics of aviation safety, as well as the specifics of the spacecraft they would have to fly. Water survival training was conducted with the 3613th Combat Crew Training Squadron at Homestead Air Force Base in Florida and parasail training at Vance Air Force Base in Oklahoma. On August 31, 1979, NASA announced that the 35 astronaut candidates had completed their training and evaluation, and were now officially astronauts, qualified for selection on space flight crews. Their training, which had been expected to last eighteen to twenty-four months, had been completed in fourteen. That of subsequent classes was shortened to twelve months.

Each of the new astronauts specialized in certain aspects of the Space Shuttle program, providing astronaut support and input. Lucid was involved with Spacelab 1 crew training, and the development of the Shuttle Avionics Integration Laboratory (SAIL) at JSC and Rockwell International's Flight Systems Laboratory (FSL) in Downey, California. She also worked on the Hubble Space Telescope and rendezvous proximity operations. She was at Edwards Air Force Base as a member of the exchange crew for the landing of the STS-5 mission in November 1982. The exchange crew took over from the flight crew after they had landed, and handled the post-flight activities. She was an astronaut support person (ASP) at the Kennedy Space Center (KSC) for the STS-8 mission in August 1983. Also known as a "Cape Crusader", an ASP was an astronaut who supported vehicle and payload testing at KSC, and strapped the flight crew into their seats before takeoff. For the STS-41-B mission in February 1984 she was the backup ASP and once again a member of the exchange crew.

=== STS-51-G ===
On November 17, 1983, Lucid was assigned to her first flight, the STS-51-A mission. Tentatively scheduled for October 24, 1984, the mission would be commanded by Daniel Brandenstein, with pilot John O. Creighton and Lucid, Fabian and Steven R. Nagel as mission specialists. She would be the last of the six women in the TFNG group to fly. Due to slippages, the crew was reassigned to the STS-51-D mission in August 1984. This mission had a different payload, and it was scheduled to be launched on March 18, 1985. The mission was scrubbed just three weeks before the launch date. In May 1985 the crew was reassigned to the STS-51-G mission. A French astronaut, Patrick Baudry, and a Saudi Arabian prince, Sultan bin Salman Al Saud were assigned as payload specialists.

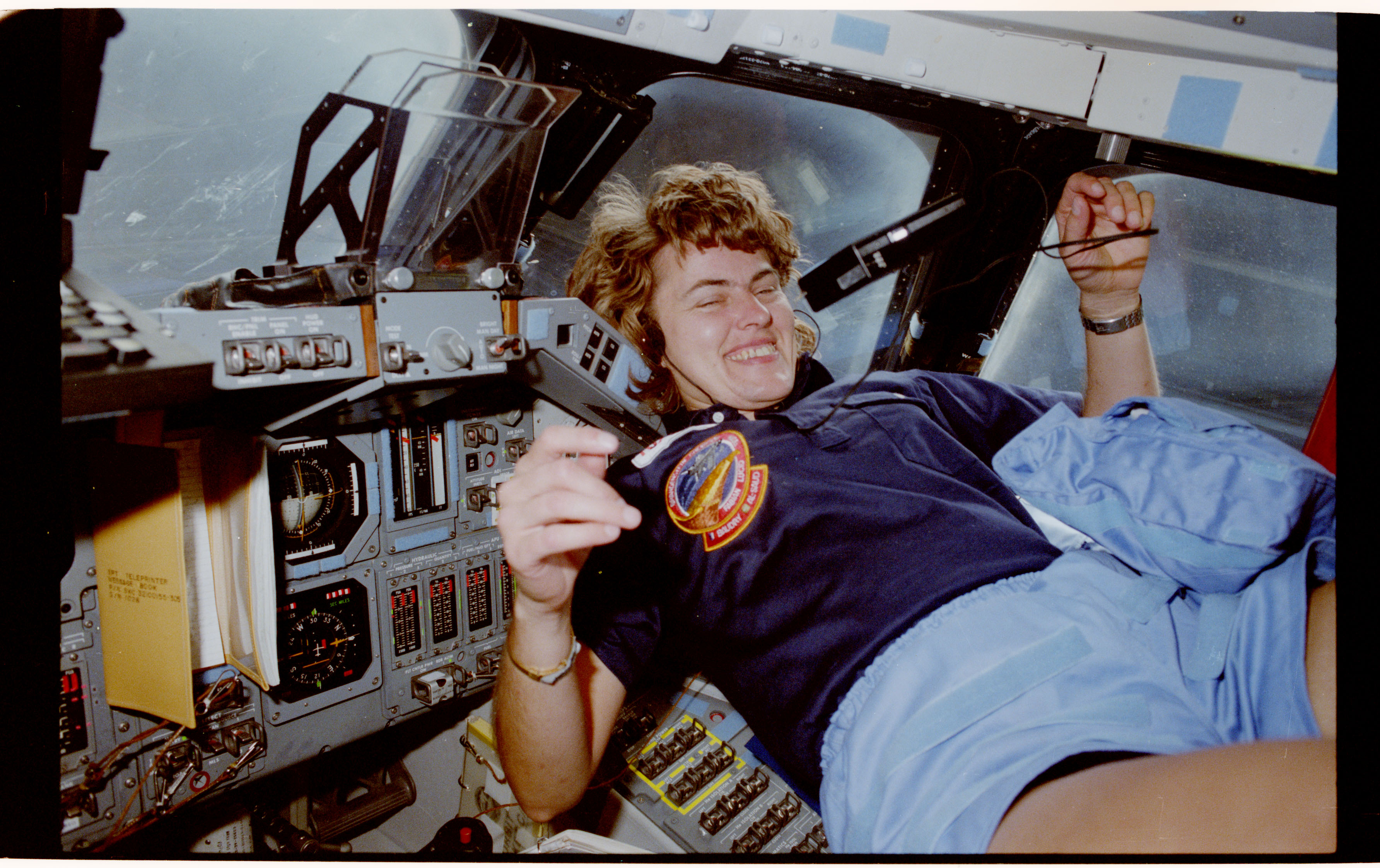
On the STS-51-G mission

STS-51-G lifted off from Launch Complex 39A at KSC in the Space Shuttle Discovery on June 17, 1985. The seven-day mission was to deploy three communications satellites: Morelos I for Mexico, Arabsat-1B for the Arab League, and Telstar 303 for the United States. The satellites were launched on successive days during the first three days of the mission. Lucid and Fabian operated the Remote Manipulator System (RMS) to deploy the satellites, which were boosted into geostationary transfer orbits by Payload Assist Module (PAM-D) booster stages.

Lucid also used the RMS to deploy the Spartan (Shuttle Pointed Autonomous Research Tool for Astronomy) satellite, which performed 17 hours of X-ray astronomy experiments while separated from the Space Shuttle, while Fabian handled its retrieval 45 hours later. In addition to the satellite deployments, the crew activated the Automated Directional Solidification Furnace (ADSF), six Getaway Specials and participated in biomedical experiments. Discovery landed at Edwards Air Force Base in California on June 24. The mission was accomplished in 112 orbits of the Earth, traveling 4.7 million kilometers (2.9 million miles) in 169 hours and 39 minutes (just over one week).

The publicity tour that usually followed a Space Shuttle mission included a trip to Saudi Arabia. Married women were not permitted to travel to Saudi Arabia without their husband, and Michael Lucid was unavailable, so Lucid decided not to go. A devout Christian, she disapproved of the way Saudi Arabia treated women. When the rest of the crew arrived in Riyadh, her absence was noted. This prompted a call from King Fahd of Saudi Arabia to President Ronald Reagan. Lucid went to Saudi Arabia and shook hands with the king, but she stayed for only one day. For the visit to be possible, Lucid was designated by the Saudi Arabian government as an honorary man.

=== STS-34 ===
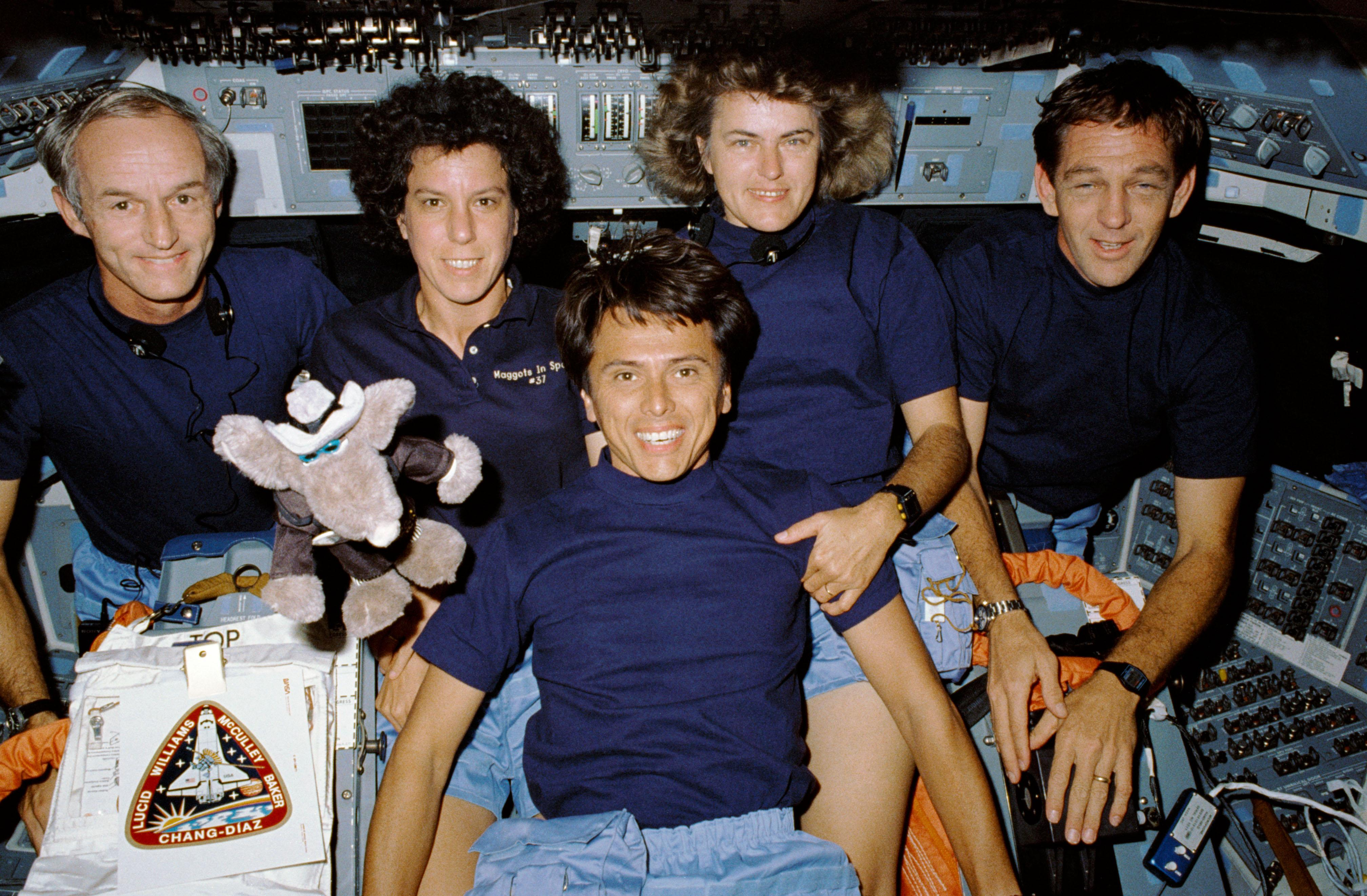
The five STS-34 astronauts pose for an in-space crew portrait.

After the STS-51-G mission, Lucid was assigned to Capsule Communicator (CAPCOM) duty. She served as the CAPCOM for the STS-51-J mission in October 1985, the STS-61-A mission in November 1985, STS-61-B mission in November and December 1985, and the STS-61-C mission in January 1986. The January 1986 Space Shuttle Challenger disaster later that month halted Space Shuttle operations for 32 months while NASA conducted investigations and remediation. Flight crews were stood down. One consequence of the disaster was the Galileo project, an unmanned probe to Jupiter, which lost both its launch window and its ride due to the cancelation of the Shuttle-Centaur project.

On November 30, 1988, NASA announced that Galileo would be deployed by the Space Shuttle Atlantis on the STS-34 mission, which was scheduled for October 12, 1989. The mission was commanded by Donald E. Williams, with pilot Michael J. McCulley and Lucid, Ellen S. Baker and Franklin Chang-Diaz as mission specialists. The launch was delayed for five days due to a faulty Space Shuttle main engine controller, and then for an additional day due to bad weather. Atlantis lifted off from KSC on October 18.

As the lead mission specialist, Lucid was primarily responsible for the Galileo spacecraft, and initiated its deployment by pressing a button to separate Galileo from Atlantis. Galileo was successfully deployed six and a half hours into the flight using the Inertial Upper Stage (IUS). As this was much less powerful than the Shuttle-Centaur upper stage, Galileo had to employ a gravity assist from Venus and two from Earth, and it took six years instead of two for the Galileo to reach Jupiter. "Both Ellen and I sighed a great sigh of relief, because we figured Galileo was not our concern at that point, because we'd gotten rid of it," Lucid reported. "Happiness was an empty payload bay and we got happier and happier as the IUS and Galileo went further away from us."

The mission also conducted a five-day Shuttle Solar Backscatter Ultraviolet (SSBUV) experiment carried in the cargo bay, and experiments related to growth hormone crystal distribution (GHCD) and polymer morphology (PM), a sensor technology experiment (STEX), a mesoscale lightning experiment (MLE), a Shuttle Student Involvement Program (SSIP) experiment that investigated ice crystal formation in zero gravity, and a ground-based Air Force Maui Optical Station (AMOS) experiment. Lucid and Chang-Diaz operated the PM experiment, which used a laptop computer to collect two gigabytes of data from an infrared spectrometer to study the effects of microgravity on minerals. The crew filmed their activities with an IMAX camera. The mission completed 79 orbits of the Earth, traveling 3.2 million kilometers (2 million miles) in 119 hours and 39 minutes before landing at Edwards Air Force Base on October 23.

=== STS-43 ===
In May 1990 NASA announced that Lucid was assigned to the crew of the STS-43 mission, which was scheduled to be flown in Discovery in April 1991. The mission was commanded by John E. Blaha, with Michael A. Baker as the pilot and Lucid, G. David Low, and James C. Adamson as the mission specialists. The objective of the mission was to deploy TDRS-E, a communications satellite that would form part of NASA's Tracking and Data Relay Satellite System.

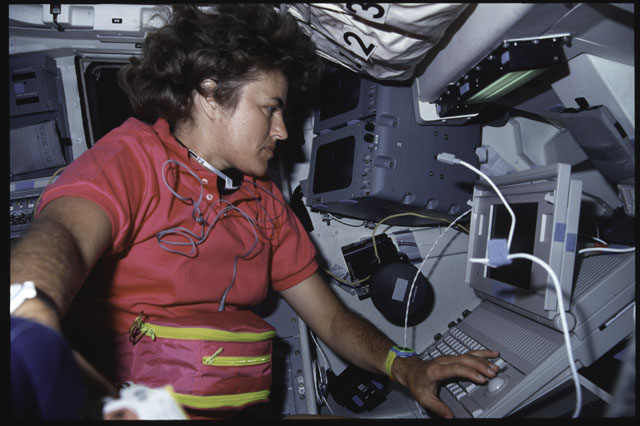
Lucid conducts Development Test Objective (DTO) 1208, Space Station Cursor Control Device Evaluation II and Advanced Applications, at the payload station on the aft flight deck of the Space Shuttle Atlantis

The launch date was postponed to July 23, and the orbiter was changed to Atlantis. The launch was delayed by a day to replace a faulty integrated electronics assembly that controlled the separation of the orbiter and the external tank, and then the countdown was halted with five hours to go due to a faulty main engine controller, and the launch was postponed to August 1. Unfavorable weather prompted yet another 24-hour delay. Atlantis lifted off on August 2.

The crew deployed TDRS-E without incident using the IUS. The crew also conducted 32 physical, material and life science experiments, mostly related to the Extended Duration Orbiter and Space Station Freedom. These included experiments with the Space Station Heat Pipe Advanced Radiator Element II (SHARE II), the Shuttle Solar Backscatter Ultra-Violet (SSBUV) instrument, Tank Pressure Control Equipment (TPCE), and Optical Communications Through Windows (OCTW). There was also an auroral photography experiment (APE-B), a protein crystal growth experiment, testing of the bioserve / instrumentation technology associates materials dispersion apparatus (BIMDA), investigations into polymer membrane processing (IPMP), the space acceleration measurement system (SAMS), a solid surface combustion experiment (SSCE), use of the ultraviolet plume imager (UVPI); and the Air Force Maui optical site (AMOS) experiment.

Atlantis performed 142 orbits of the Earth, traveling 6.0 million kilometers (3.7 million miles) in 213 hours and 21 minutes. STS-43 was the eighth mission to land at KSC, and the first one scheduled to do so since STS-61-C in January 1986.

=== STS-58 ===
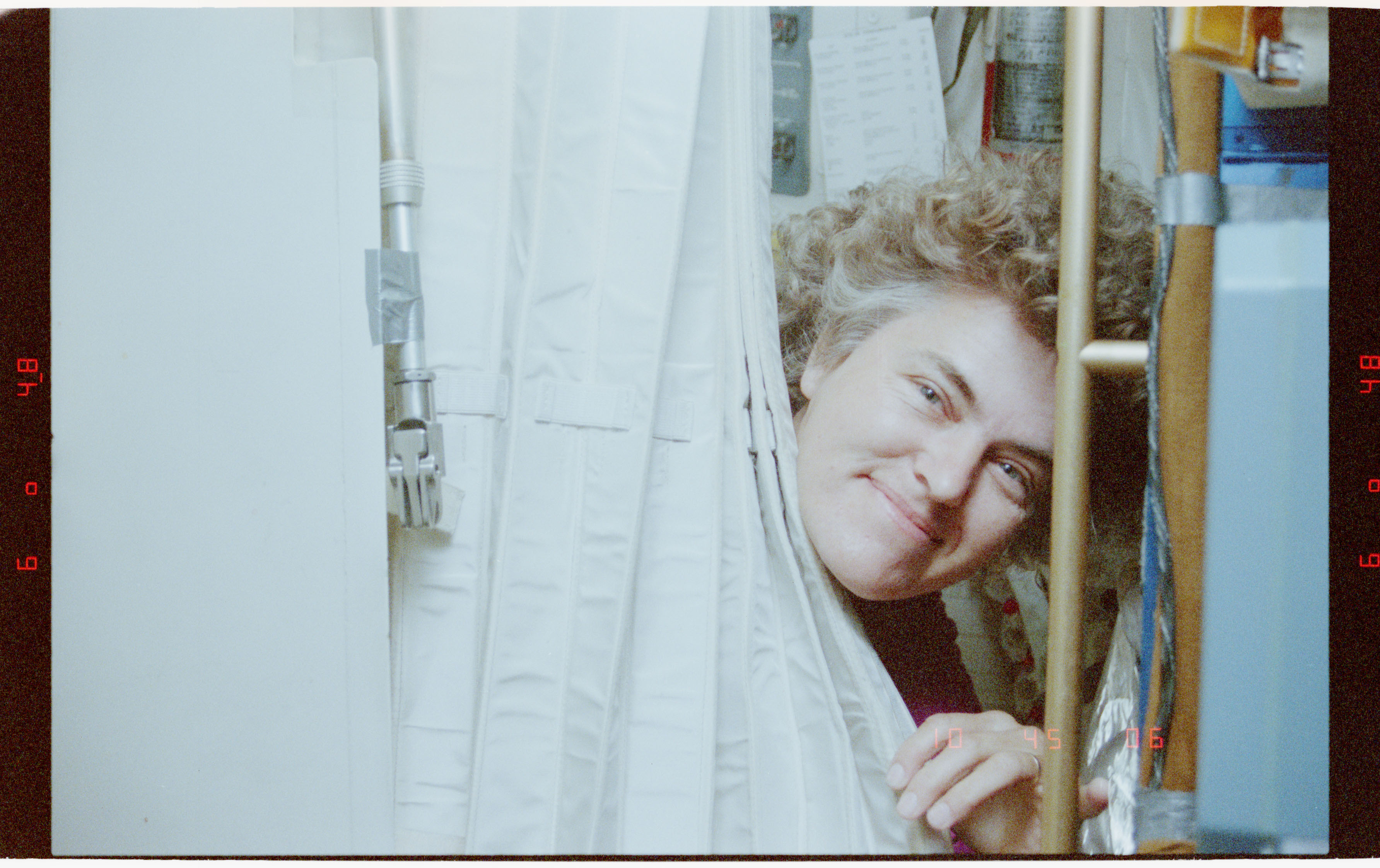
Lucid, in the middeck waste collection system facility, peeking out from behind the privacy curtain

On December 6, 1991, Lucid was assigned to STS-58, the Spacelab Life Sciences 2 (SLS-2) mission. This was the second mission dedicated to the study of human and animal physiology on Earth and in spaceflight. The techniques developed for this flight were intended to be precursors of those to be conducted on the Space Station Freedom and subsequent long-duration space flights. Fellow TFNG Rhea Seddon was designated as the mission payload commander, with David Wolf, like Seddon a medical doctor, as the other mission specialist. Originally scheduled as one mission, the number of Spacelab Life Sciences objectives and experiments had grown until it was split into two missions, the first of which, STS-40/SLS-1, was flown in June 1991. The rest of the crew were not named until August 27, 1992. Blaha was designated the mission commander, with pilot Richard A. Searfoss and William S. McArthur Jr. as a fourth mission specialist. A payload specialist, Martin J. Fettman, was assigned to the mission on October 29.

The Space Shuttle Columbia with SLS-2 on board lifted off from KSC on October 18, 1993. During the fourteen-day flight the crew performed neurovestibular, cardiovascular, cardiopulmonary, metabolic and musculoskeletal medical experiments on themselves and 48 rats. The crew investigated the phenomenon of bone density loss. They also studied the effects of microgravity on their sensory perception, and the mechanism of space adaptation syndrome. To study this, on the second day of the mission Lucid and Fettman wore headsets, known as accelerometer recording units, which recorded their head movements during the day. Along with Seddon, Wolf and Fettman, Lucid collected blood and urine samples from the crew for metabolic experiments. They also drew blood from the tails of the rats to measure how weightlessness affected their red blood cell counts. They performed sixteen engineering tests aboard Columbia and twenty Extended Duration Orbiter Medical Project experiments. The mission completed 225 orbits of the Earth, traveling five million miles in 336 hours, 13 minutes and 1 second. Landing was at Edwards Air Force Base, California. On completion of this flight, Lucid had logged 838 hours and 54 minutes in space.

=== Shuttle–Mir ===
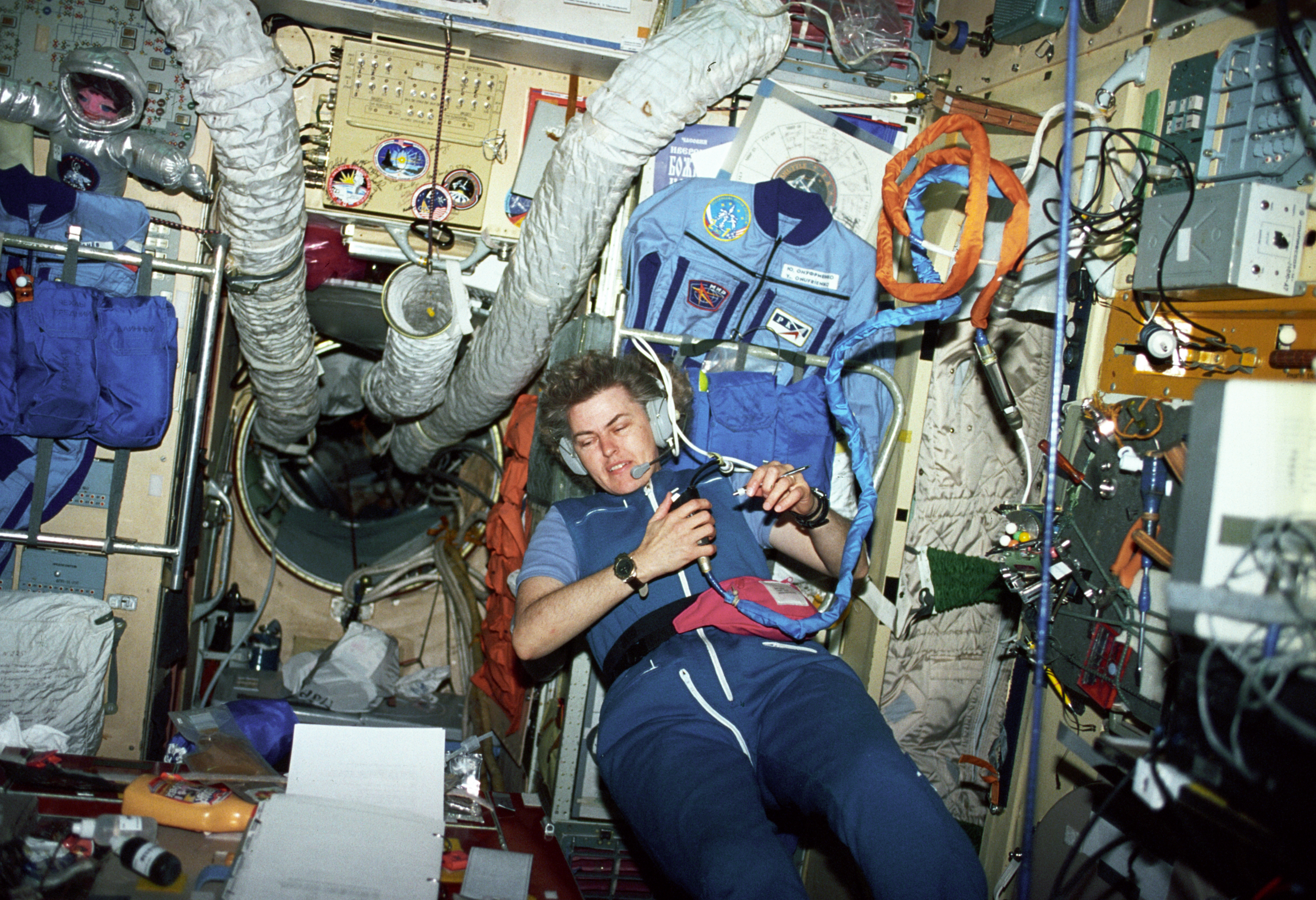
Communicating with the ground support team inside the Core Module of Mir

In 1992 the United States and Russia reached an agreement on cooperation in space so that Russian cosmonauts could fly on the Space Shuttles, and American astronauts on the Russian Mir space station. The prospect of a long stay on Mir was not one calculated to appeal to most astronauts: they had to learn Russian and train at Star City for a year to spend several months on board Mir carrying out science experiments with Russian cosmonauts. "I was wondering what it would be like to spend a long period of time in space," Lucid later recalled. "I told everybody I wanted to do it, and they couldn't find anybody else who had volunteered. So they said: 'Well OK, go do it.'" In January 1995 Lucid and Blaha joined fellow astronauts Bonnie Dunbar and Norman Thagard for Mir training in Star City. On March 30, 1995, NASA announced that Lucid would be the second astronaut to stay aboard Mir, after Thagard, who arrived on the space station on March 16.

Lucid's mission to Mir commenced on March 22, 1996, with liftoff from KSC aboard Atlantis on the STS-76 mission. Atlantis docked with Mir on March 24, and Lucid became the first American woman to live on the station. She joined cosmonauts Yuri Onufriyenko and Yuri Usachov, neither of whom spoke English. During the course of her stay aboard Mir, Lucid performed numerous life science and physical science experiments. She lit candles to study the behavior of fire in a microgravity environment; studied the way that quail embryos developed in their shells; grew protein crystals; and cultivated wheat in a tiny greenhouse. She injected herself with an immune system stimulant and collected blood and saliva samples to study the effects of microgravity on the immune system.

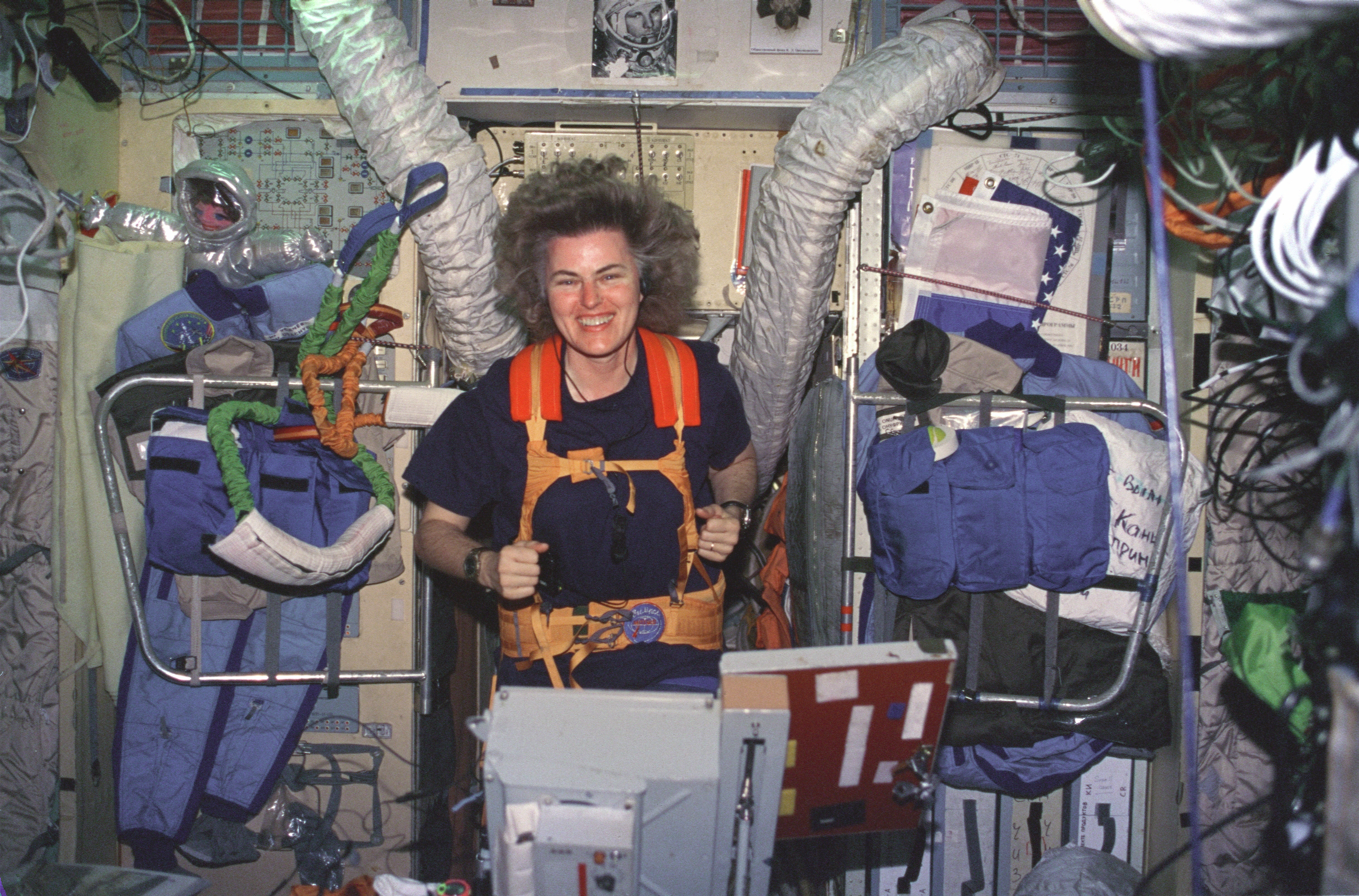
Exercising on a treadmill during her stay aboard Mir

In her free time, she read books. One novel she enjoyed immensely was The Mirror of Her Dreams, however she arrived at the finish only to find it ended on a cliffhanger. "I floated there, alone in Spectra, in stunned disbelief, holding only volume one," she later recalled. "I was stranded, the impossibility of running to the local bookstore forefront in my mind ... How could my daughter have done this to me? Who would send only one volume of a two-volume set to her mother in space?" She arranged for the second volume to be sent on the next Progress resupply freighter. She left her books on Mir for later astronaut visitors, but they became inaccessible after the Progress M-34 collision in June 1997. Thagard had warned Lucid about the Russians' fondness for jellied fish and borscht. She brought a supply of M&M's and jello with her, and lived on a combination of Russian and American food.

Lucid's return journey to KSC was made aboard Atlantis. The STS-79 mission docked with Mir on September 18, bringing Blaha as her relief, and landed back at KSC on September 26, 1996. One of the catches that released her helmet from the neck ring became stuck where technicians had to use pliers and a screwdriver to remove it. During her stay on Mir, Lucid had spent nearly 400 hours exercising on a stationary bicycle and a treadmill, and was able to stand and walk off Atlantis. Administrator of NASA Daniel Goldin presented her with a giftwrapped box of M&M's, a gift from President Bill Clinton, since she had told him that she craved them.

In completing this mission Lucid traveled 121.0 million kilometers (75.2 million miles) in 188 days, 4 hours, 0 minutes. This included 179 days on Mir. Her stay on Mir was not expected to last so long but her return was delayed twice, extending her stay by about six weeks. As a result of her time aboard Mir, she held the record for the most hours in orbit by a non-Russian, and most hours in orbit by a woman until June 16, 2007, when her record for longest duration spaceflight by a woman was exceeded by Sunita Williams on the International Space Station.

=== CAPCOM ===
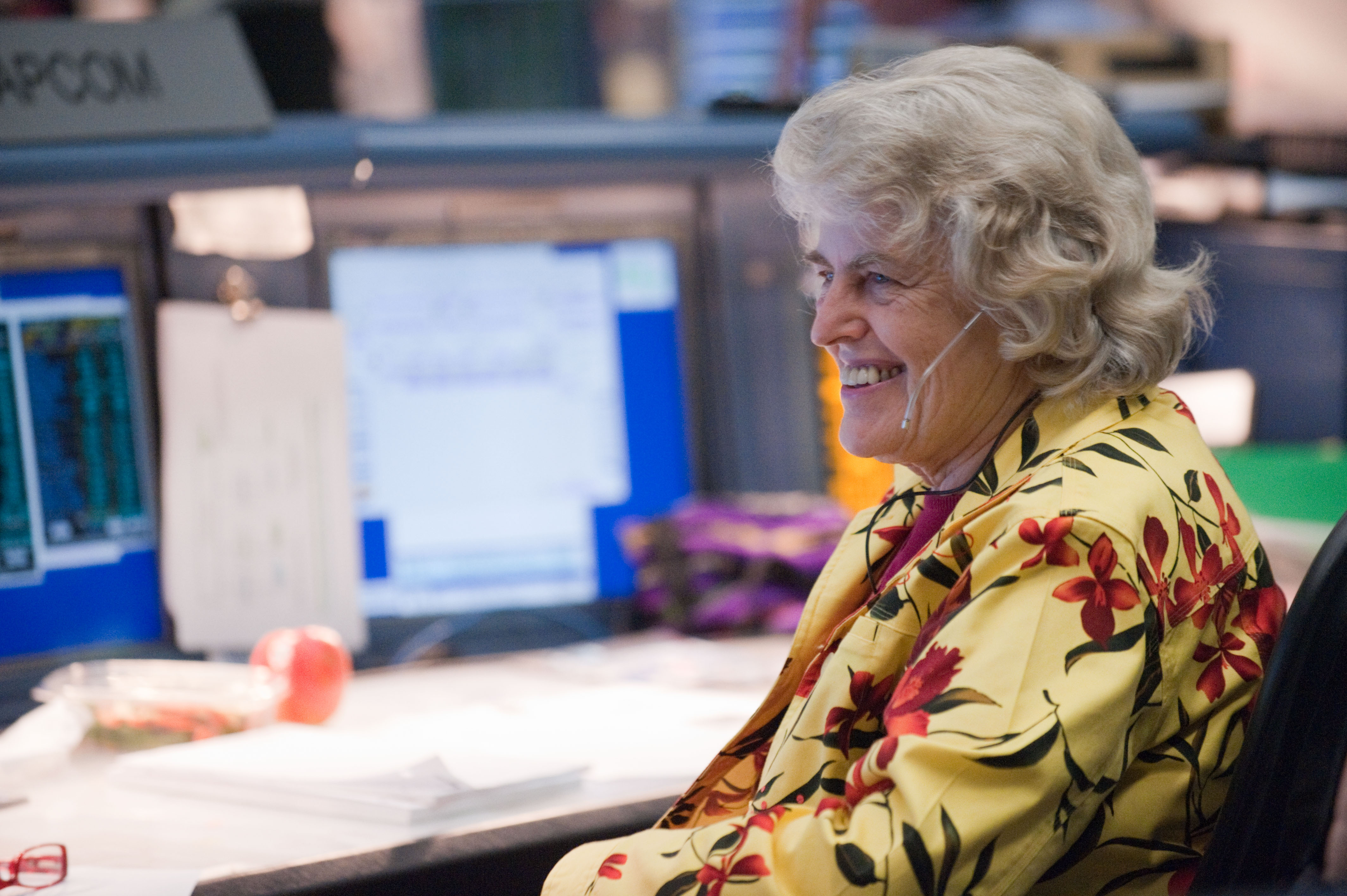
As CAPCOM on July 12, 2011, on the STS-135 mission

Lucid had a short cameo in the 1998 film Armageddon. From 2002 to 2003, she served as Chief Scientist of NASA. Starting in 2005, she served as lead CAPCOM on the Planning (overnight) shift at the Mission Control for sixteen Space Shuttle missions, including STS-135, the final mission. On January 31, 2012, she announced her retirement from NASA.

== Later life ==
Lucid retired from NASA to take care of her husband Mike, who had dementia. He died on December 25, 2014. She later wrote about this experience in her book No Sugar Added: One Family's Saga of Dementia and Caretaking (2019). She wrote about her experiences on Mir in Tumbleweed: Six Months Living on Mir (2020).

== Awards and honors ==
Lucid was awarded the Congressional Space Medal of Honor in December 1996 (for her mission to Mir), making her the tenth person and first woman to be given this honor. She was also awarded the NASA Space Flight Medal in 1985, 1989 (twice), 1991, 1993 and 1996; the NASA Exceptional Service Medal in 1988, 1990, 1992 and 2003 (twice); and the NASA Distinguished Service Medal in 1994 and 1997. Shanon was also awarded in Russia with Order of Friendship in 1996 and with Medal "For Merit in Space Exploration" in 2011. She was inducted into the International Space Hall of Fame in 1990, the Oklahoma Women's Hall of Fame in 1993, the National Women's Hall of Fame in 1998, and the United States Astronaut Hall of Fame in 2014. In 2002 Discover magazine recognized her as one of the fifty most important women in science.

== Bibliography ==
- Lucid, Shannon (2019). No Sugar Added: One Family's Saga of Dementia and Caretaking. Vista, California: MkEk Publishing. ISBN 978-0-578-49541-5.
- Lucid, Shannon (2020). Tumbleweed: Six Months Living on Mir. Vista, California: MkEk Publishing. ISBN 978-0-578-67109-3.
