= Rhea Seddon =

American astronaut and physician (born 1947)

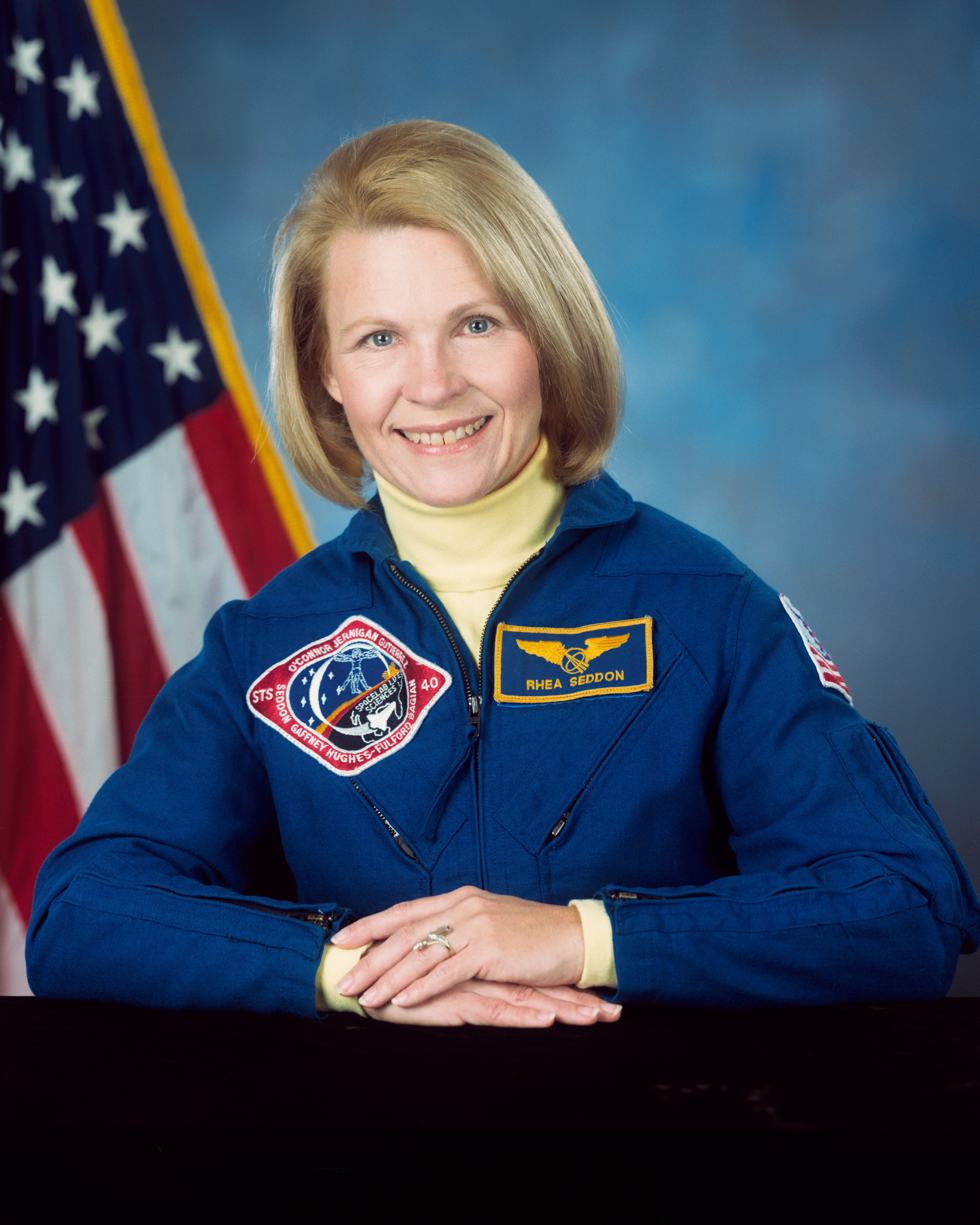
- Seddon in 1992
- Born: Margaret Rhea Seddon; November 8, 1947 (age 78); Murfreesboro, Tennessee, U.S.
- Education: University of California, Berkeley (BS); University of Tennessee, Memphis (MD)
- Awards: NASA Space Flight Medal (3); NASA Exceptional Service Medal (2); NASA Outstanding Leadership Medal
- Space career

NASA astronaut
- Time in space: 30d 2h 21m
- Selection: NASA Group 8 (1978)
- Missions: STS-51-D; STS-40; STS-58
- Website: Official website

Margaret Rhea Seddon (born November 8, 1947) is an American surgeon and retired NASA astronaut. After being selected as part of the first group of astronauts to include women in 1978, she flew on three Space Shuttle flights: as a mission specialist on STS-51-D and STS-40, and as a payload commander for STS-58, accumulating over 722 hours in space. On these flights, she built repair tools for a US Navy satellite and performed medical experiments.

A graduate of the University of California, Berkeley, and the University of Tennessee College of Medicine, Seddon was awarded her doctor of medicine (MD) degree in 1973. During her residency with the University of Tennessee hospitals, she was the only woman in the General Surgery Residency Program. Before, during, and after her career in the astronaut program, she was active in hospitals emergency departments in Tennessee, Mississippi, and Texas.

Seddon became an astronaut on August 9, 1979, after selection as a candidate the year prior. At NASA her development work included the Space Shuttle Orbiter and payload software, the Shuttle Avionics Integration Laboratory, the Flight Data File, the Space Shuttle medical kit, and checklists for launch and landing. She was a rescue helicopter physician for the early Space Shuttle flights and a support crew member for STS-6. She served as a member of NASA's Aerospace Medical Advisory Committee, as a technical assistant to the director of flight crew operations, and as a capsule communicator (CAPCOM) in the Mission Control Center. In 1996 she was detailed by NASA to Vanderbilt University Medical School in Nashville, Tennessee, where she assisted in the preparation of cardiovascular experiments that flew on the STS-90 Neurolab Spacelab flight in April 1998. She retired from NASA in November 1997 and became Assistant Chief Medical Officer of the Vanderbilt Medical Group.

== Early life and education ==
Margaret Rhea Seddon was born in Murfreesboro, Tennessee, on November 8, 1947, the first child of Edward C. Seddon, a lawyer, and his wife Clayton Ransom née Dann. She had a younger sister, Louise. Seddon was named after her maternal grandmother, and known by her middle name, Rhea, which is pronounced "ray". She grew up in Murfreesboro, where she attended St. Rose of Lima Catholic School. The nuns at St. Rose did not teach science until the Sputnik crisis made it a national priority. A science teacher was then recruited, and Seddon began studying science in the seventh grade. In 1960 she wrote a school report on what would happen to people who ventured into space. She attended Central High School in Murfreesboro, where she was a cheerleader. She graduated in 1965.

A friend of the family, Lois Kennedy, was a physician—Seddon worked in her office one summer—and inspired her to pursue a career in medicine. Another friend of the family, Florence Ridley, a professor of English at the University of California, Los Angeles, recommended some universities in California with good life sciences programs. Seddon entered the University of California, Berkeley, where she joined the Sigma Kappa sorority. Her father had been on the board of directors of Rutherford County Hospital, which was opening a new coronary care unit in the summer after her freshman year, and he arranged for Seddon to spend her summer there as an aide. However, the new center's opening was delayed, and she spent the summer working in the surgical unit, where she decided to become a surgeon. She received her Bachelor of Arts degree in physiology in 1970.

During her senior year at Berkeley, Seddon was accepted by the University of Tennessee College of Medicine. When she matriculated in 1970, there were only six women in the class of more than one hundred medical students. She was awarded her Doctor of Medicine (MD) degree in 1973. Her father paid for flying lessons as a graduation gift. Seddon did her one-year internship at the Baptist Memorial Hospital-Memphis. Women were not permitted in the surgery doctors' lounge there, so she had to wait between cases on a folding chair in the nurses' bathroom. She then did three years of residency at the University of Tennessee hospitals in Memphis, where she was the only woman in the General Surgery Residency Program. She worked in emergency departments at several hospitals in Mississippi and Tennessee, despite this being against the rules of the residency program.

== NASA career ==
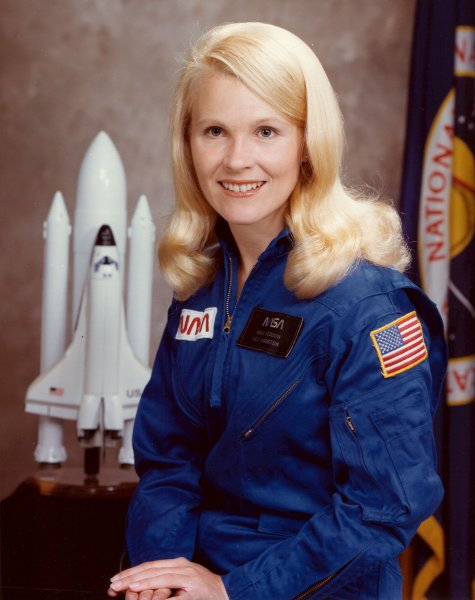
Portrait from 1978

=== Selection ===
On July 8, 1976, the National Aeronautics and Space Administration (NASA) issued a call for applications for pilot and mission specialist candidates. It was the first time that women were encouraged to apply. A colleague, Russ Greer, a neurosurgery resident who had worked at NASA and was aware that Seddon had expressed an interest in becoming an astronaut, informed Seddon of the selection process that was underway, and she decided to apply. She wrote to NASA and was sent an application form. She found that at 62 inches (157 cm) in height, she was just tall enough to meet the minimum height requirement of 60 inches (152 cm) for mission specialists. The application required three references, and she chose three people who had most strongly influenced her to that point: James Pate, the head of surgery at the hospital; Jose Guma, her flying instructor; and Jim Arnhart, the administrator of Rutherford Hospital.

From 8,079 applicants NASA identified 208 for further screening, conducted in groups of about twenty. Seddon was contacted by Jay F. Honeycutt from NASA and was asked to come to the Johnson Space Center (JSC) for a week of interviews and physical examinations, beginning August 29, 1977. Her group of twenty applicants was the first one that included women. Among the eight women in the group were Anna Sims, Shannon Lucid, Nitza Cintron, and Millie Hughes-Wiley. Afterwards, she returned to the Memphis Veterans Administration Hospital, where she commenced a residency in plastic surgery. She soon changed course again after she developed a particular interest in the nutrition of surgery patients. In January 1978 journalist Jules Bergman asked if he could interview her on Good Morning America, and he revealed that she had been selected for astronaut training; Seddon received official word from George Abbey, NASA's Director of Flight Crew Operations on January 16. The names of the 35 successful candidates in NASA Astronaut Group 8 were publicly released later that day.

=== Training ===
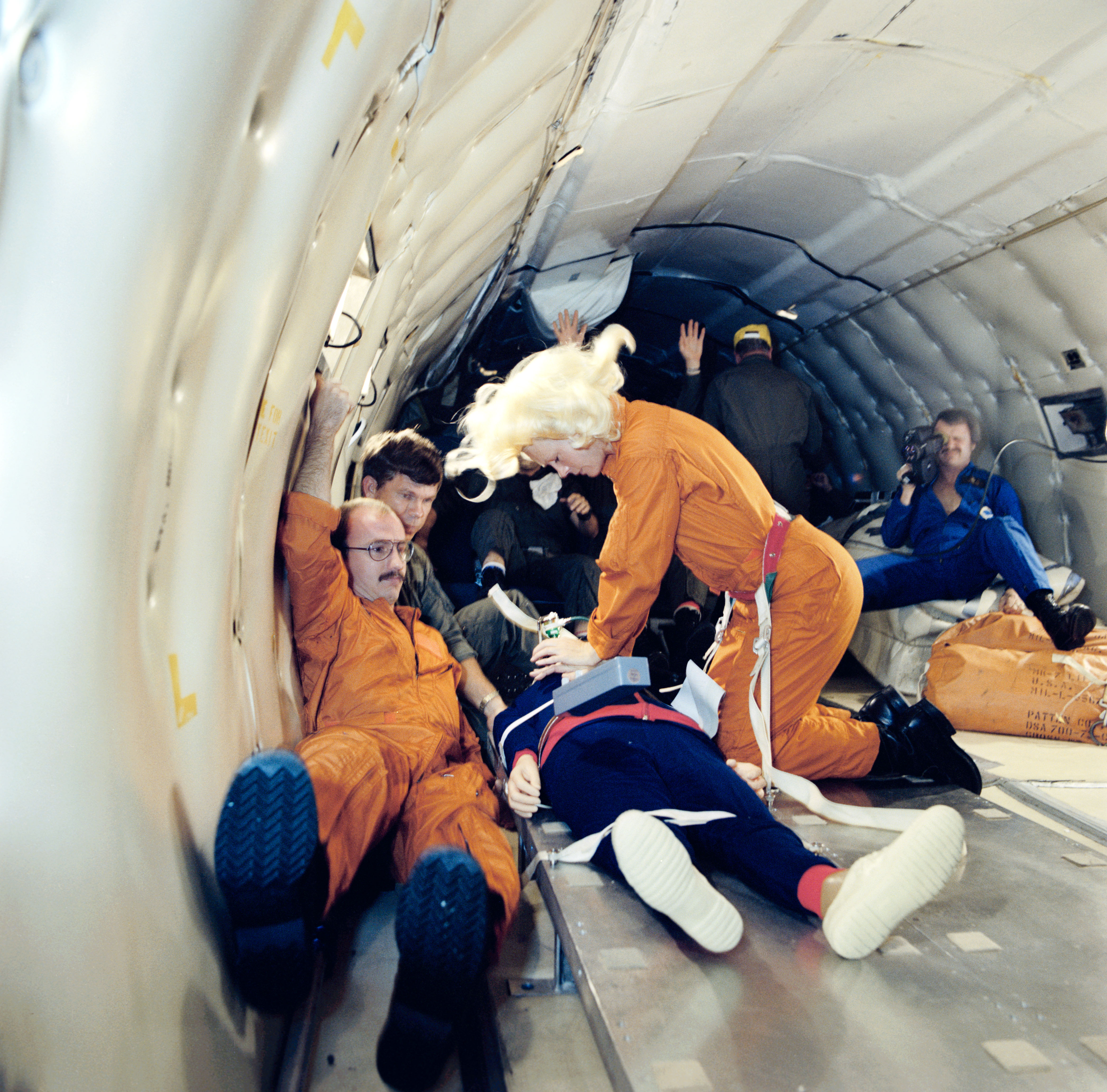
Practicing CPR during a zero‑G training flight

New selections were considered astronaut candidates rather than full-fledged astronauts until they finished their training and evaluation, which was expected to take two years. Group 8's name for itself was "TFNG". The abbreviation was deliberately ambiguous; for public purposes, it stood for "Thirty-Five New Guys", but within the group itself, it was known to stand for the military phrase, "the fucking new guy", used to denote newcomers to a military unit. Pilot training was not required of mission specialist candidates, but they were given training in how to handle emergencies while flying in the back seat of NASA's Northrop T-38 Talon jets. Seddon had a private pilot license, and logged time spent in the T-38 as co-pilot time. Due to her small size and the ill-fitting parachute harness she had to wear, she had trouble climbing into the aircraft.

A particularly difficult part of the curriculum for Seddon was SCUBA training, which was conducted in the pool at the Clear Lake Recreational Center. She was not a strong swimmer, and it took practice and exercise to develop proficiency. SCUBA training was a prerequisite for Extravehicular Activity (EVA) training, but Seddon was never considered for this because NASA did not have space suits in her small size. She was sent to the 1979 Paris Air Show to represent NASA along with Mercury Seven astronaut Deke Slayton. The two of them drew crowds of people who wanted to see a famous astronaut or were curious about what a woman astronaut was like.

As an astronaut candidate, Seddon drew a civil service salary of about US$22,000 (equivalent to $109,000 in 2025), which was more than she made as a surgical resident. Nonetheless, when she went to buy a townhouse she was told that her income was $3,000 short of what was required, even with her father putting up the deposit. United Savings and Loan refused to lend her the money without her father's co-signature. She also bought a new Chevrolet Corvette. She figured that her astronaut job took up only fifty to sixty hours a week, which left time to practice medicine. This required six months to obtain a Texas medical license and secure permission from NASA Headquarters, and another loan from her father to cover the license fee and malpractice insurance. After several months of serving in the emergency rooms of various hospitals, she met Diana Fire, a physician who worked at Sam Houston Memorial Hospital, and accepted an offer to work in the emergency room there on weekends. Seddon worked there until it closed twelve years later, then moved to Spring Branch Hospital, where she remained until she left Houston.

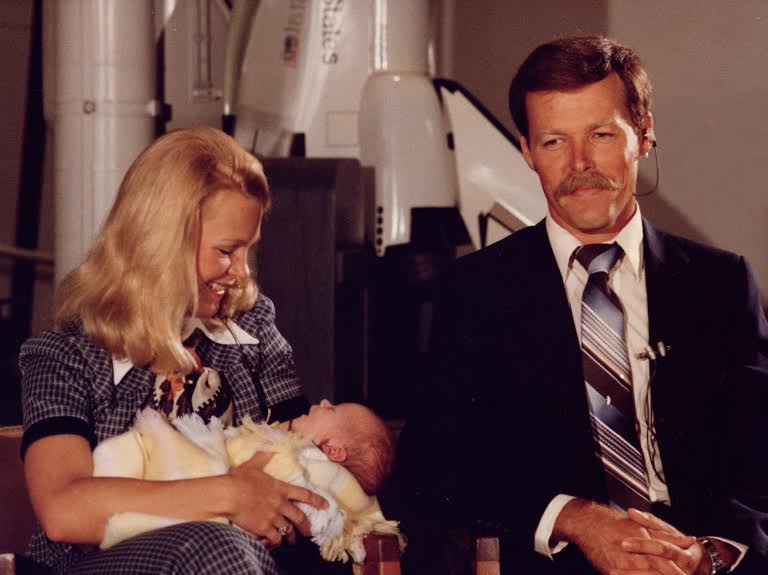
Seddon and Gibson with newborn baby Paul

Seddon officially became an astronaut in August 1979, after NASA decided that one year of training was sufficient. As with earlier astronaut groups, each astronaut candidate was assigned a particular specialization; Seddon's assignment was the Space Shuttle food system and the orbital medical kit. For STS-1, the first orbital spaceflight of NASA's Space Shuttle program and the inaugural flight of the Space Shuttle Columbia, Abbey decided that the five MDs of the 1978 and 1980 astronaut groups – Norman Thagard, Anna Fisher and Seddon from the 1978 group, and Bill Fisher and Jim Bagian from the 1980 group – would be assigned to the search and rescue helicopters supporting the flight. These would be required if the Space Shuttle crashed or the astronauts had to eject. Seddon was placed in charge of the group, and as such could choose her assignment. She, therefore, decided to join the group at Cape Canaveral. In the event, the mission went well, and search and rescue were not required.

In February 1981 Seddon became engaged to fellow astronaut Robert L. "Hoot" Gibson. They were married on May 30 in a ceremony at the First United Methodist Church in Murfreesboro, followed by a reception at the Stones River Country Club. A second reception was held in Houston, followed by a honeymoon in Hawaii. Seddon (who retained her maiden name) then resumed her role with search and rescue in preparation for the upcoming STS-2 mission. She also worked in the Shuttle Avionics Integration Laboratory, where the Space Shuttle's software was tested.

Seddon's first child was born in July 1982 and was named Paul Seddon Gibson after Gibson's father. Gibson already had one child, a daughter called Julie, from his first marriage. While many astronauts had children, this was the first child born to an astronaut couple. The newborn suffered from a serious condition arising from inhaling meconium and was rushed by helicopter from Clear Lake Hospital to Houston's Hermann Hospital, where he soon responded to treatment.

=== Space flights ===
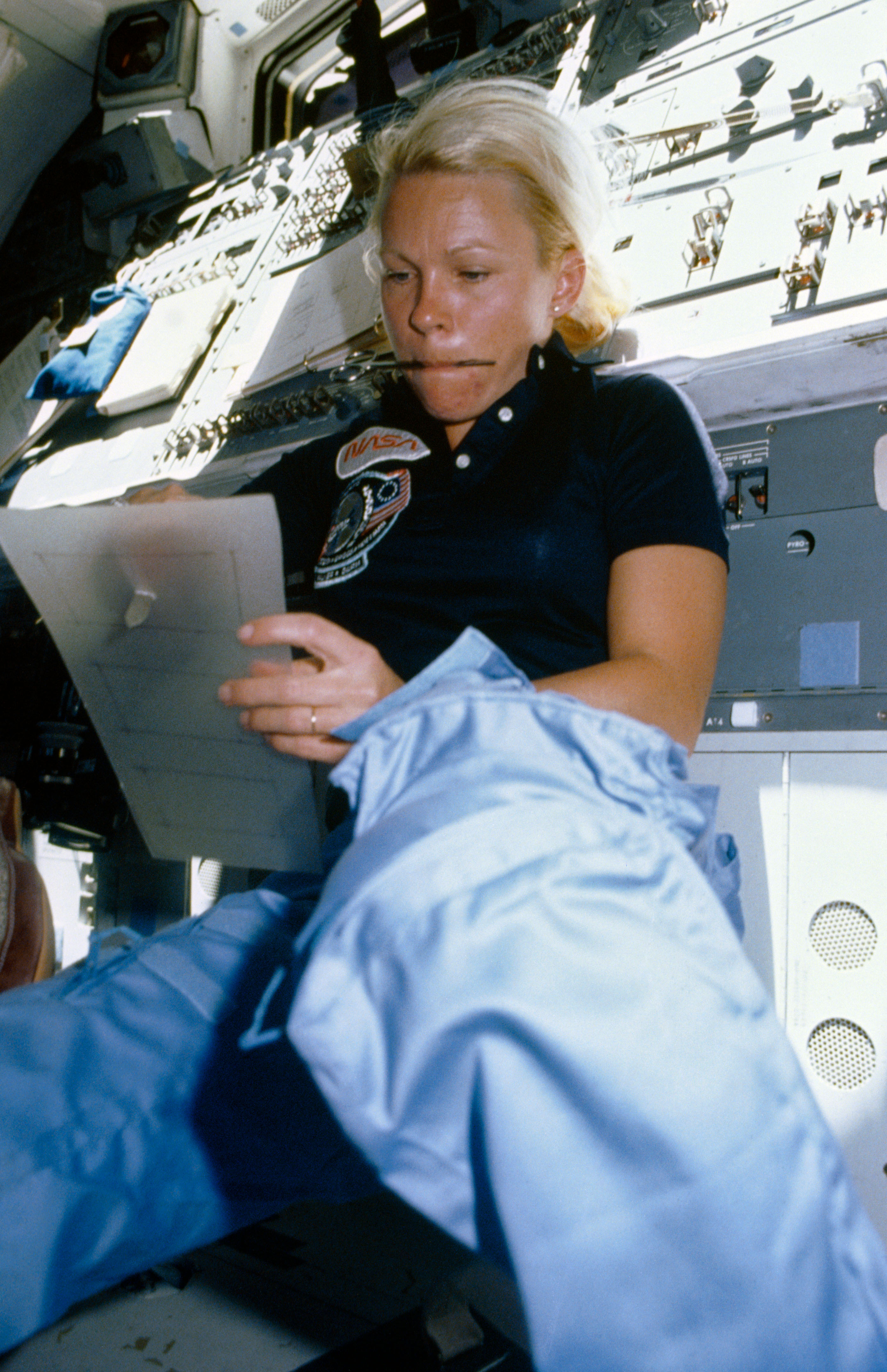
Seddon builds a homemade repair tool during the STS-51-D mission in 1985.

In August 1983 Abbey offered Seddon a flight assignment on STS-41-E, which she accepted. Had the mission been flown as planned in August 1984, she would have become the third American woman to fly in space, but the mission, which was renumbered STS-41-F, was delayed and then canceled. The crew was kept together and assigned to STS-51-E, but it too was delayed and canceled. Finally, they were assigned to STS-51-D. With each change of mission came different payloads requiring different training.

The mission was scheduled to lift off on March 19, 1985, but suffered a series of delays. STS-51-D lifted in the Discovery from the Kennedy Space Center (KSC) on April 12, 1985. The crew deployed the ANIK-C satellite for Telesat of Canada, and Syncom IV-3 for the US Navy. A malfunction in the Syncom spacecraft resulted in the first unscheduled spacewalk, rendezvous, and proximity operations for the Space Shuttle in an attempt to activate the satellite using the Remote Manipulator System (RMS). Seddon used her surgical skills to operate a bone saw to help build homemade repair tools for the satellite. She was able to manually engage the start lever with the RMS, but the launch sequence did not commence, and the satellite was left in low Earth orbit. On this mission she logged 168 hours in 109 Earth orbits.

After the flight she presented a banner she had flown with to Central Middle School (as Central High School now was), and met President Ronald Reagan at the Oval Office in Washington, DC. The Syncom IV-3 satellite was retrieved, repaired, and launched into a geostationary orbit by the STS-51-I mission in August 1985.

Even before the STS-51-D mission was flown, Abbey offered Seddon a chance to fly on the Spacelab Life Sciences (SLS-1) mission, which was scheduled to lift off aboard the Columbia in late January 1986. She accepted but had doubts about whether she could be ready in time with all her work and home commitments. As it turned out, there was ample time because it was delayed due to the Space Shuttle Challenger disaster. While she waited for her Spacelab Life Sciences mission to be scheduled, she sought out a refresher program in emergency medicine. Such programs were uncommon at the time, but she found one at Denver General Hospital. The course cost several thousand dollars, which she could not afford, but she wrote to Vincent Markovchik, the head of the program, and he agreed to waive the fee. In 1988 Abbey offered her the chance of another flight in the meantime, but Seddon declined, as she was hoping to have another child, and felt that the SLS-1 mission needed someone to watch over it, even if its launch was years in the future.

Seddon also began to think about acquiring some managerial experience and went to see Carolyn Huntoon, the head of the Space and Life Sciences Directorate at JSC, about a secondment to her area. Huntoon agreed to take Seddon on as an assistant in the spring of 1988. However, while Abbey was Director of Flight Operations, he had an astronaut technical assistant, known in the NASA Astronaut Corps as the "Bubba". The main job of the technical assistant was acting as Abbey's pilot, but the technical assistant also did many odd jobs on Abbey's behalf. When Don Puddy succeeded Abbey, he considered abolishing the position, but in May 1988 Seddon was unexpectedly given the job. Under Puddy, the job no longer entailed being a personal pilot and driver, but Seddon still worked on a variety of tasks. These included preparations for the STS-26 "Return to Flight" mission, and developing policies in cooperation with the Space and Life Sciences Directorate. She helped establish criteria for access to astronauts' psychiatric records, procedures for clearing astronauts as medically fit to fly, and processes for using astronauts for medical experiments. She left the position when she had her second child, Edward Dann Gibson (named after her father), who was born in March 1989.

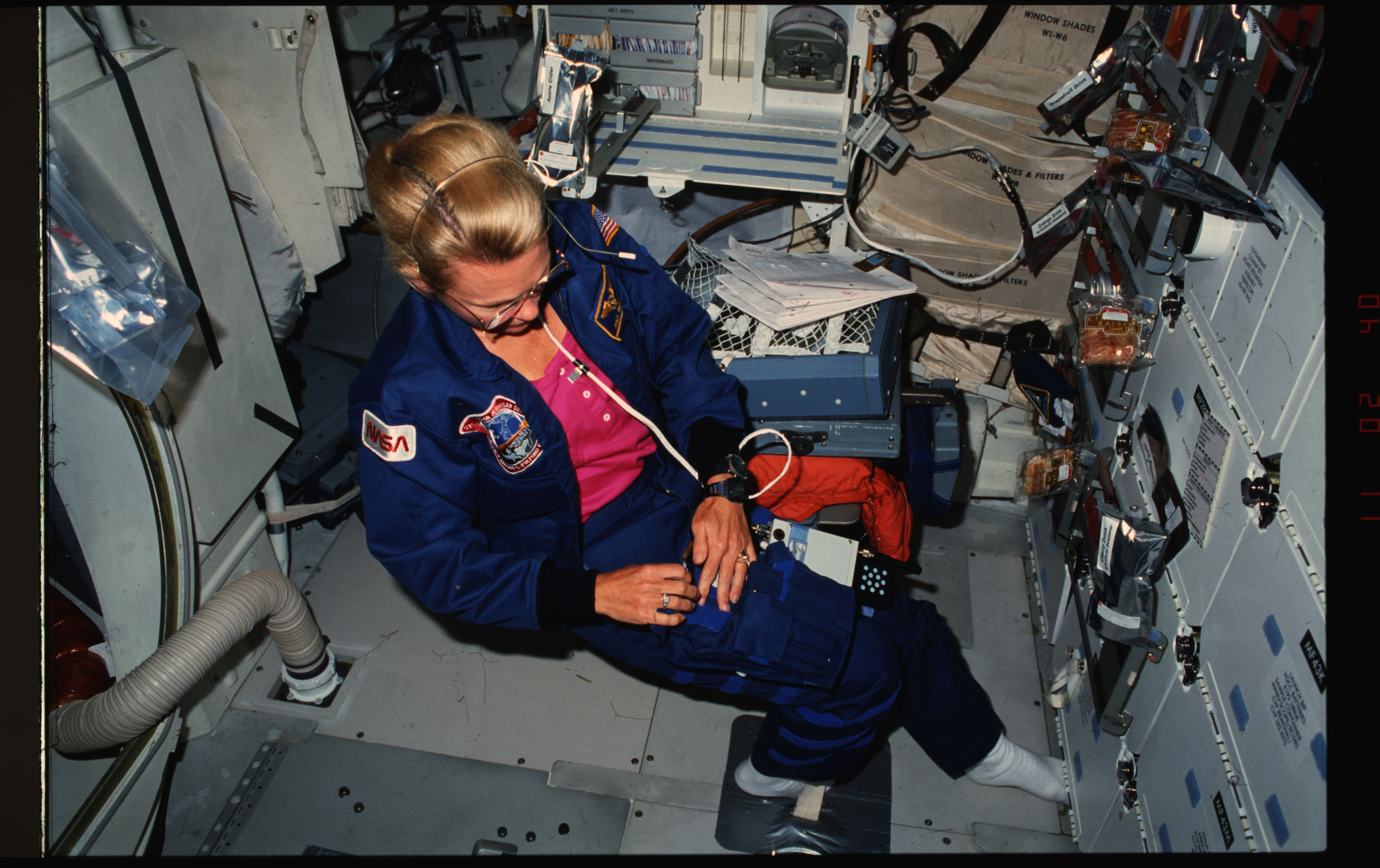
Seddon on the STS-40 mission

When Seddon returned from maternity leave in July 1989, the launch of SLS-1 had been added to the flight schedule as STS-40, with a launch date of May 1990. By this time the crew had been training a few hours per month since January 1986, and the payload had been changed several times. It was so overbooked with experiments that the mission was split into two: SLS-1 and SLS-2. One crew member, Bob Phillips, was grounded with a minor medical condition and was replaced by Millie Hughes-Fulford. Hopes that training could now proceed uninterrupted were soon dashed; Seddon was called upon to participate in the selection of NASA Astronaut Group 13 (who became known as the "Hairballs"). And the schedule continued to slip.

The STS-40 SLS-1 mission finally lifted off from the KSC in the Space Shuttle Columbia on June 5, 1991. During the nine-day mission, the crew performed experiments that explored how humans, animals, and cells respond to microgravity and re-adapt to Earth's gravity on return. Other experiments were designed to investigate materials science, plant biology and cosmic radiation, and tests of hardware proposed for the Space Station Freedom Health Maintenance Facility. The mission completed 146 orbits of the Earth, and Seddon logged an additional 218 hours in space.

From September 1991 to July 1992, Seddon was a Capsule Communicator (CAPCOM) in the Mission Control Center, handling the STS-42 and STS-45 missions. She expressed a desire to Chief Astronaut Dan Brandenstein to participate in SLS-2, the follow-up mission to SLS-1. This was readily accommodated, as life sciences missions were not popular assignments among astronauts. In October 1991 she was designated the payload commander for the STS-58 / SLS-2 mission. This was a new position created to provide a single point of contact for the science crew. During training for the mission, she broke four bones in her foot while sliding down a Space Shuttle escape slide during a practice for an emergency evacuation. This was diagnosed as a Lisfranc fracture. Surgery was required to insert screws to realign the bones, and she had to spend six weeks in a cast and another six in a walking boot. This did not leave much time before the launch date, but there was no move to replace her, and the flight was delayed a few months for other reasons.

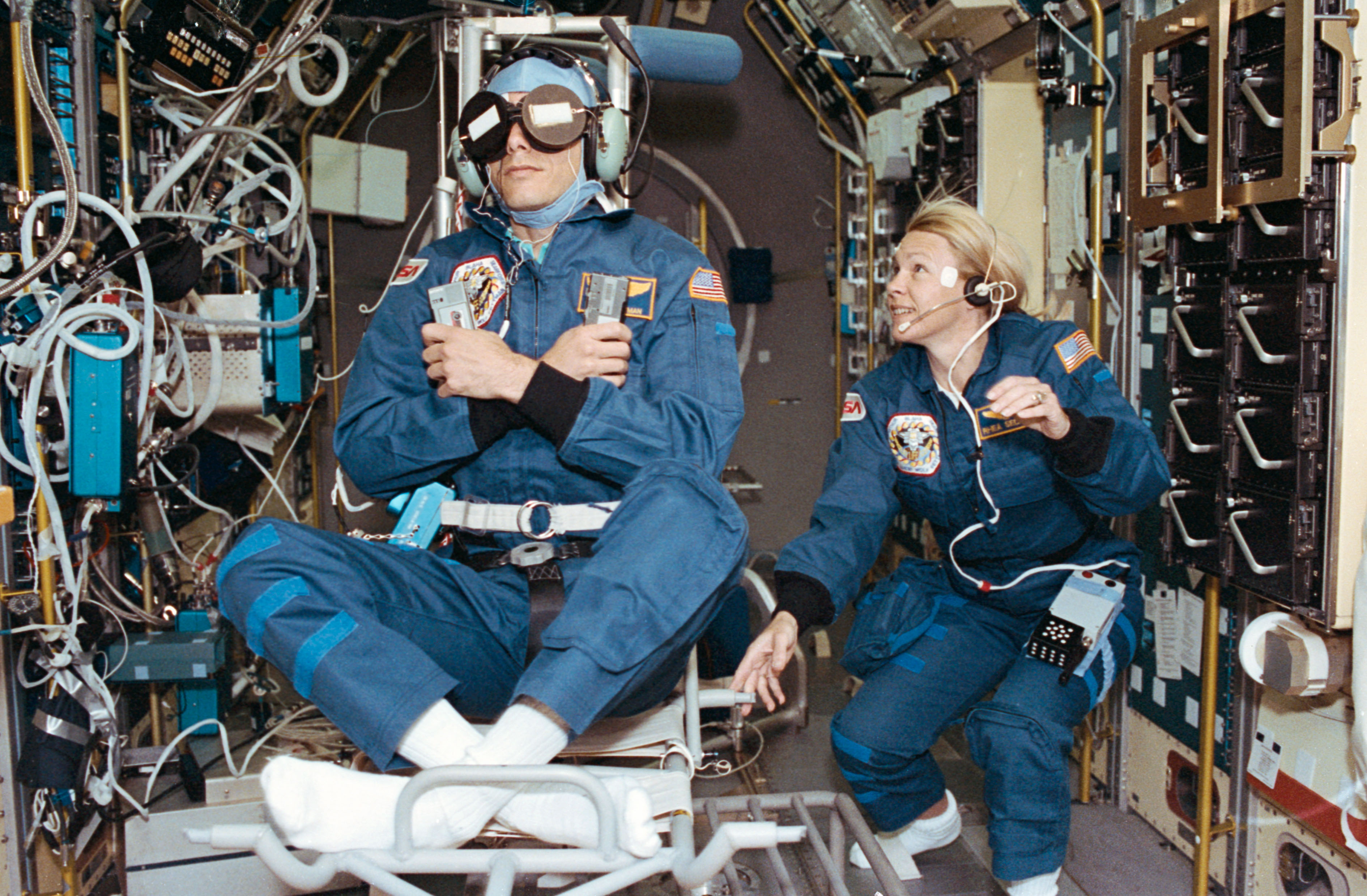
Seddon spins the Spacelab Life Sciences rotating chair as Martin Fettman serves as a test subject on the STS-58 mission.

SLS-2 involved animal testing, with mice being dissected in space. At this time NASA management began to feel pressure from animal rights groups, and NASA Administrator Dan Goldin asked for a report on the animal experiments. Seddon and payload specialist Martin J. Fettman prepared a report on how the research could be conducted without killing animals, which amounted to removing body parts without killing them. Seddon and Fettman felt that this was unethical. NASA management ordered the Director of Flight Crew Operations, David Leestma, to modify the experiments to harvest organs without killing the test animals. Leestma ignored this and took no action, so the mission was flown as originally planned.

STS-58 with SLS-2 lifted off in the Space Shuttle Columbia on October 18, 1993. During the fourteen-day flight the seven-person crew performed neurovestibular, cardiovascular, cardiopulmonary, metabolic, and musculoskeletal medical experiments on themselves and 48 rats, studying human and animal physiology both on Earth and in space flight. In addition, the crew performed ten engineering tests aboard the Orbiter Columbia and nine Extended Duration Orbiter Medical Project experiments. The mission was accomplished in 225 orbits of the Earth in over 336 hours.

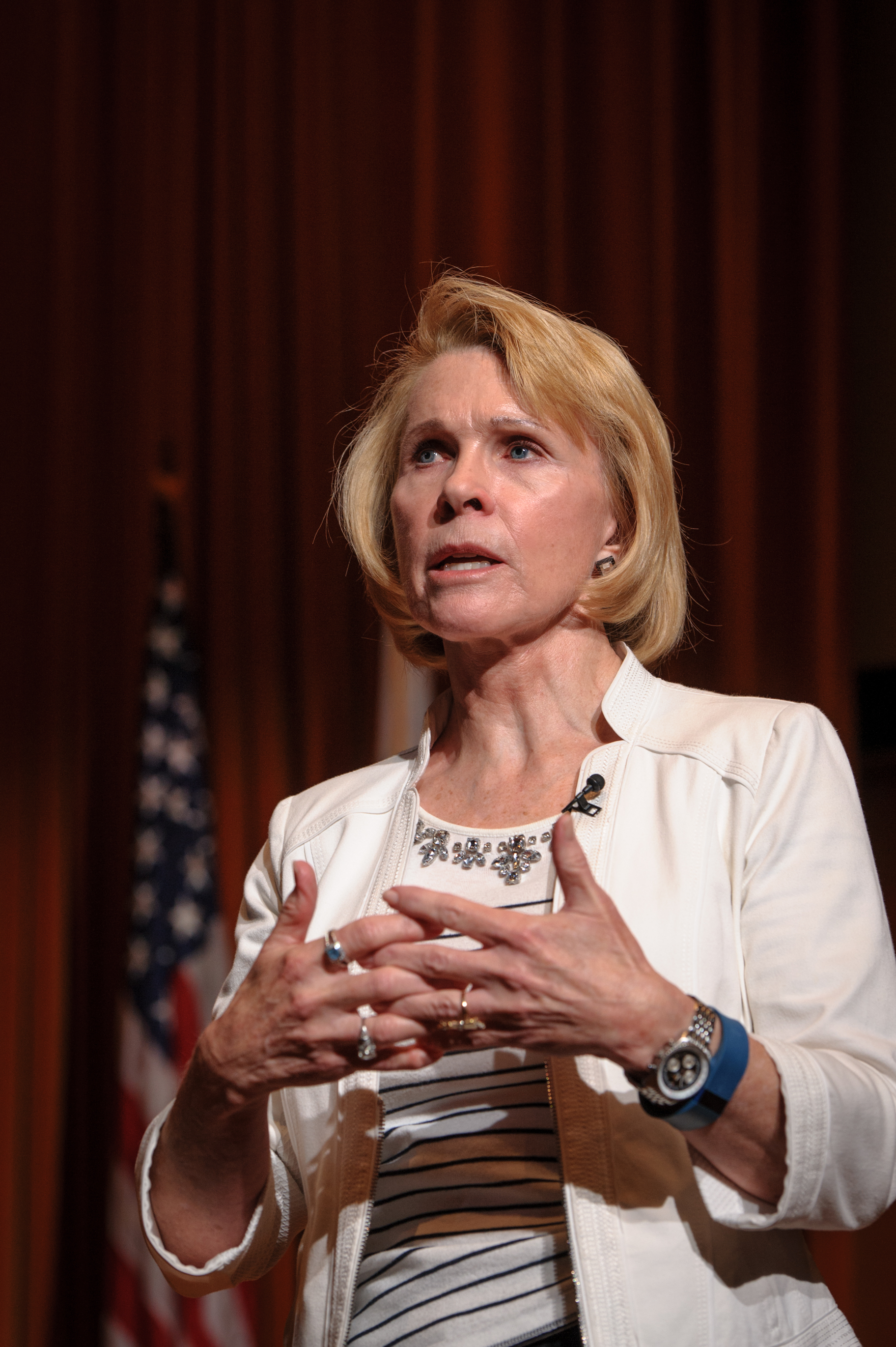
Delivering a lecture in 2015

In June 1995 Seddon had her third child, a daughter she named Emilee Louise after her sister, who had died the year before. Seddon became the Assistant to the Director of Flight Crew Operations for Shuttle/Mir Payloads, a new position, which involved travel to Russia. In September 1996 she was detailed by NASA to Vanderbilt University Medical School in Nashville, Tennessee, as an assistant Chief Medical Officer, where she assisted in its organization and structuring. She also assisted in the preparation of cardiovascular experiments that flew aboard Columbia on the STS-90 Neurolab Spacelab flight in April 1998.

== Later life ==
Seddon retired from NASA in November 1997, and for the next eleven years she was the assistant Chief Medical Officer of the Vanderbilt Medical Group in Nashville, Tennessee.

She had begun writing her memoirs in December 1993 but set the project aside in June 1996. In 2008 she enrolled in a creative writing program at Middle Tennessee State University in Murfreesboro. She afterwards completed her memoirs; the book, entitled Go For Orbit, was published in 2015 and won the Independent Book Publishers Association Ben Franklin Gold Award for Best Autobiography/Memoir.

== Awards and honors ==
Seddon's awards from NASA included the NASA Space Flight Medal in 1985, 1991 and 1993; the NASA Exceptional Service Medal in 1988 and 1992, and the NASA Outstanding Leadership Medal in 1994. She was inducted into the Tennessee Aviation Hall of Fame in 2005, and the United States Astronaut Hall of Fame and Tennessee Women's Hall of Fame in 2015. In 2017 she was named as one of the University of Tennessee Centennial Top 100 Alumni and was a co-recipient of the Great American leadership award along with Gibson.

== Bibliography ==
- Seddon, Rhea (2015). Go For Orbit: One of America's First Women Astronauts Finds Her Space. Murfreesboro, Tennessee: Your Space Press. ISBN 978-0-9962178-1-1. OCLC 921147949.

== See also ==
- List of female spacefarers
