= STS-58 =

1993 American crewed spaceflight

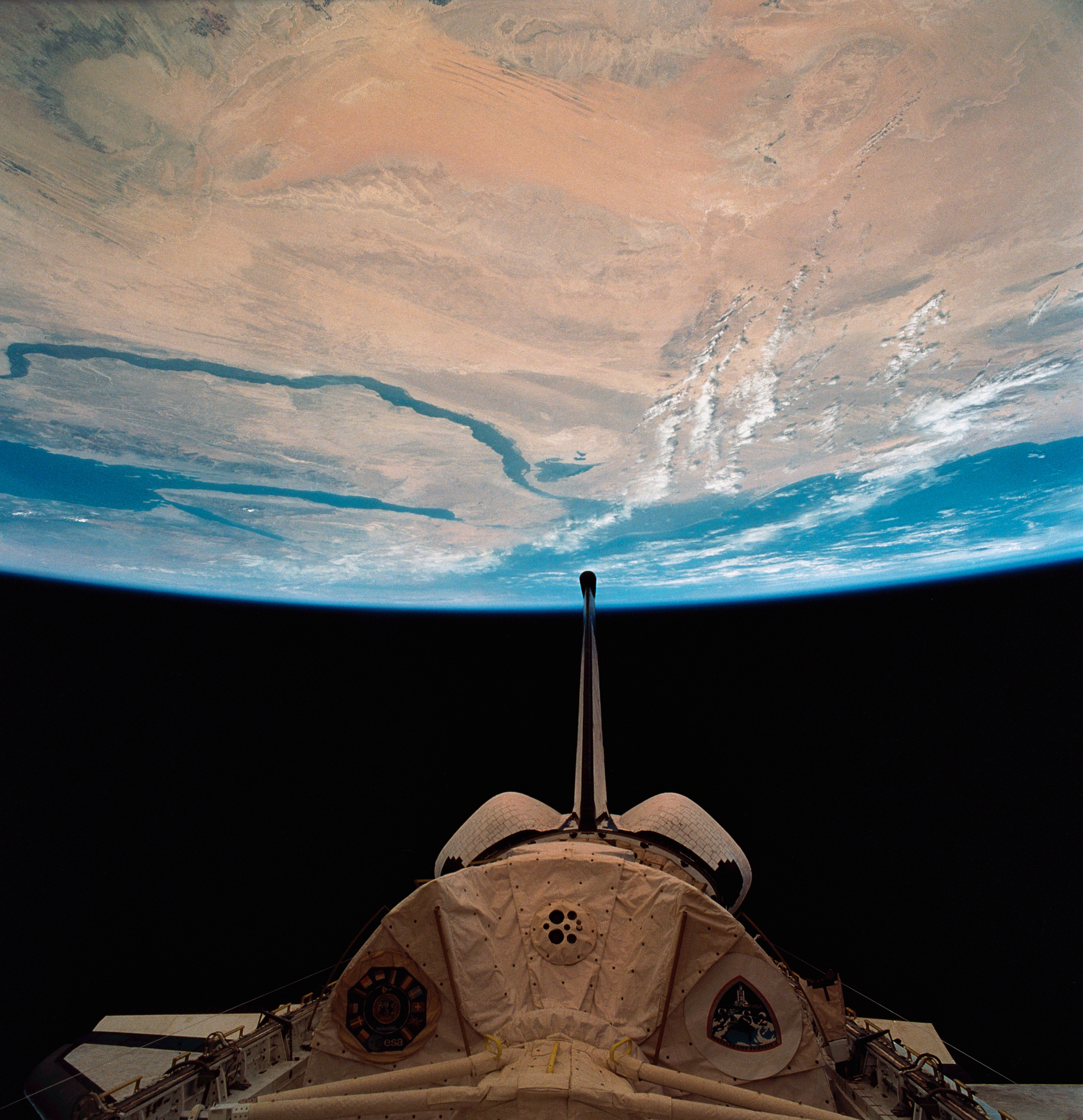
- Spacelab module LM2 in Columbia's payload bay, serving as the Spacelab Life Sciences-2 laboratory
- Names: Space Transportation System-58; Spacelab Life Sciences-2
- Mission type: Bioscience research
- Operator: NASA
- COSPAR ID: 1993-065A
- SATCAT no.: 22869
- Mission duration: 14 days, 12 minutes, 32 seconds
- Distance travelled: 9,399,290 km (5,840,450 mi)
- Orbits completed: 225

Spacecraft properties
- Spacecraft: Space Shuttle Columbia
- Launch mass: 2,050,223 kg (4,519,968 lb)
- Landing mass: 104,214 kg (229,753 lb)
- Payload mass: 11,803 kg (26,021 lb)

Crew
- Crew size: 7
- Members: John E. Blaha; Richard A. Searfoss; Rhea Seddon; William S. McArthur; David Wolf; Shannon Lucid; Martin J. Fettman

Start of mission
- Launch date: October 18, 1993, 14:53:10 UTC (10:53:10 am EDT)
- Launch site: Kennedy, LC-39B
- Contractor: Rockwell International

End of mission
- Landing date: November 1, 1993, 15:05:42 UTC (7:05:42 am PST)
- Landing site: Edwards, Runway 22

Orbital parameters
- Reference system: Geocentric orbit
- Regime: Low Earth orbit
- Perigee altitude: 284 km (176 mi)
- Apogee altitude: 294 km (183 mi)
- Inclination: 39°
- Period: 90.3 minutes
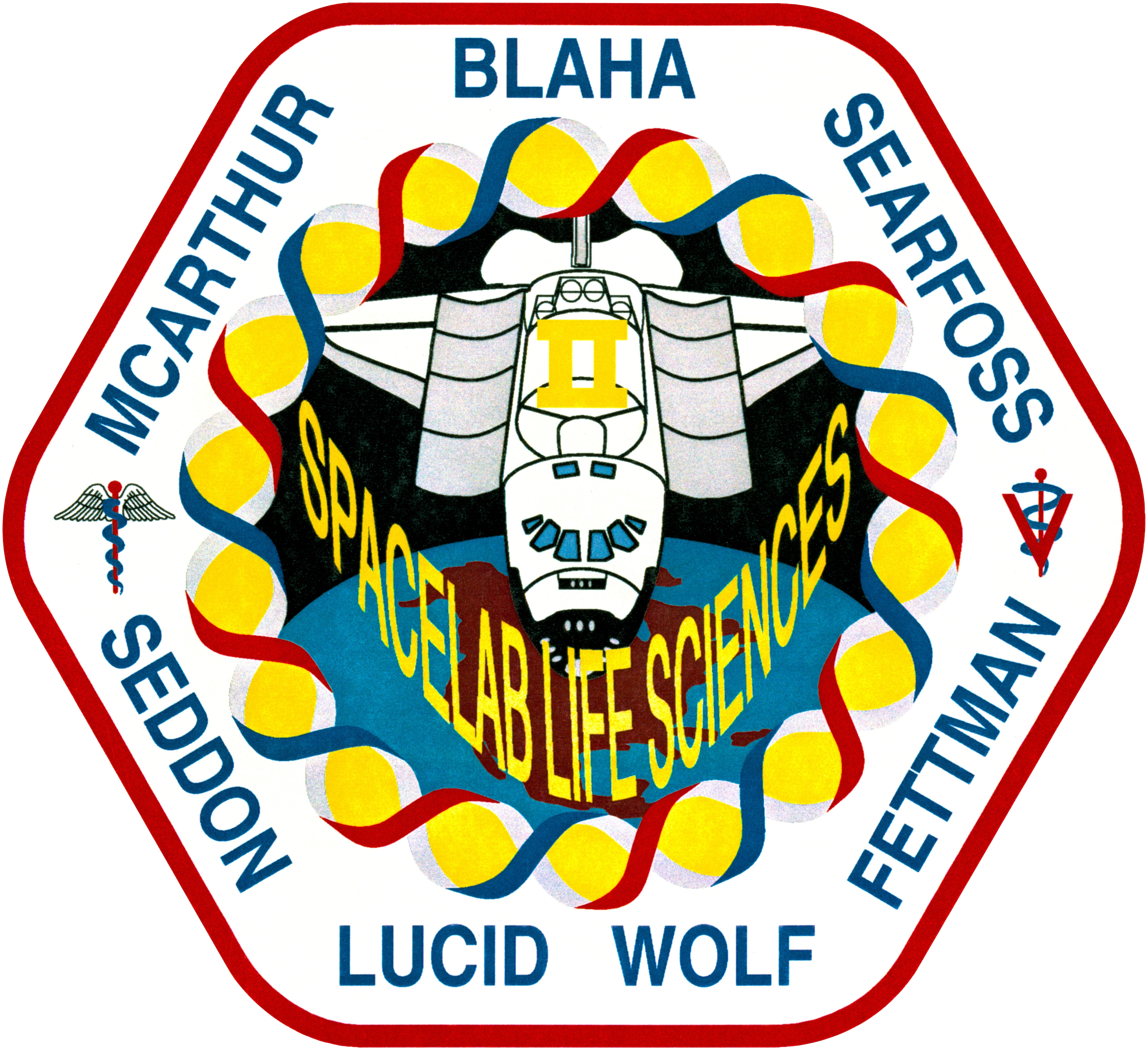
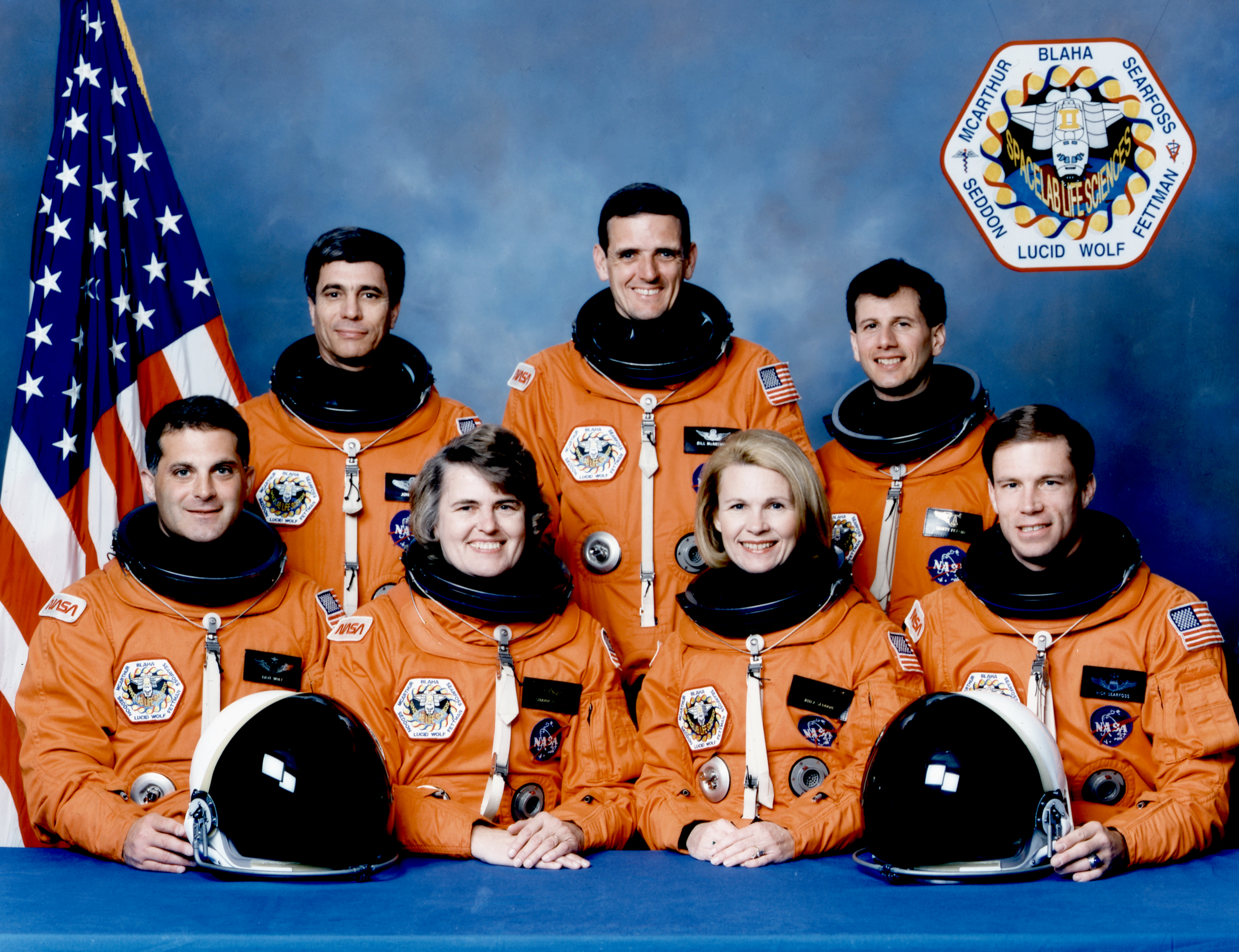
- STS-58 mission patch Standing: Blaha, McArthur and Fettman; Seated: Wolf, Lucid, Seddon and Searfoss Space Shuttle program

STS-58 was a NASA mission flown by Space Shuttle Columbia launched from Kennedy Space Center, Florida, on October 18, 1993. The missions was primarily devoted to experiments concerning the physiological effects in space. This was the first in-flight use of the "Portable In-flight Landing Operations Trainer" (PILOT) simulation software. It was also the last time Columbia would land at Edwards Air Force Base, California. The mission also attracted controversy for experiments involving the dissection of live rats in space.

== Crew ==
Position	Astronaut
Commander	John E. Blaha; Fourth spaceflight
Pilot	Richard A. Searfoss; First spaceflight
Mission Specialist 1 Payload Commander	Rhea Seddon; Third and last spaceflight
Mission Specialist 2 Flight Engineer	William S. McArthur; First spaceflight
Mission Specialist 3	David Wolf; First spaceflight
Mission Specialist 4	Shannon Lucid; Fourth spaceflight
Payload Specialist 1	Martin J. Fettman; Only spaceflight Colorado State

Backup crew
Position	Astronaut
Payload Specialist	Jay C. Buckey; Dartmouth
Payload Specialist	Laurence R. Young; MIT

=== Crew seat assignments ===
Seat	Launch	Landing	Seats 1–4 are on the flight deck. Seats 5–7 are on the mid-deck.
1	Blaha		Seats 1–4 are on the flight deck. Seats 5–7 are on the mid-deck.
2	Searfoss		Seats 1–4 are on the flight deck. Seats 5–7 are on the mid-deck.
3	Seddon	Wolf	Seats 1–4 are on the flight deck. Seats 5–7 are on the mid-deck.
4	McArthur		Seats 1–4 are on the flight deck. Seats 5–7 are on the mid-deck.
5	Wolf	Seddon	Seats 1–4 are on the flight deck. Seats 5–7 are on the mid-deck.
6	Lucid		Seats 1–4 are on the flight deck. Seats 5–7 are on the mid-deck.
7	Fettman		Seats 1–4 are on the flight deck. Seats 5–7 are on the mid-deck.

== Mission highlights ==
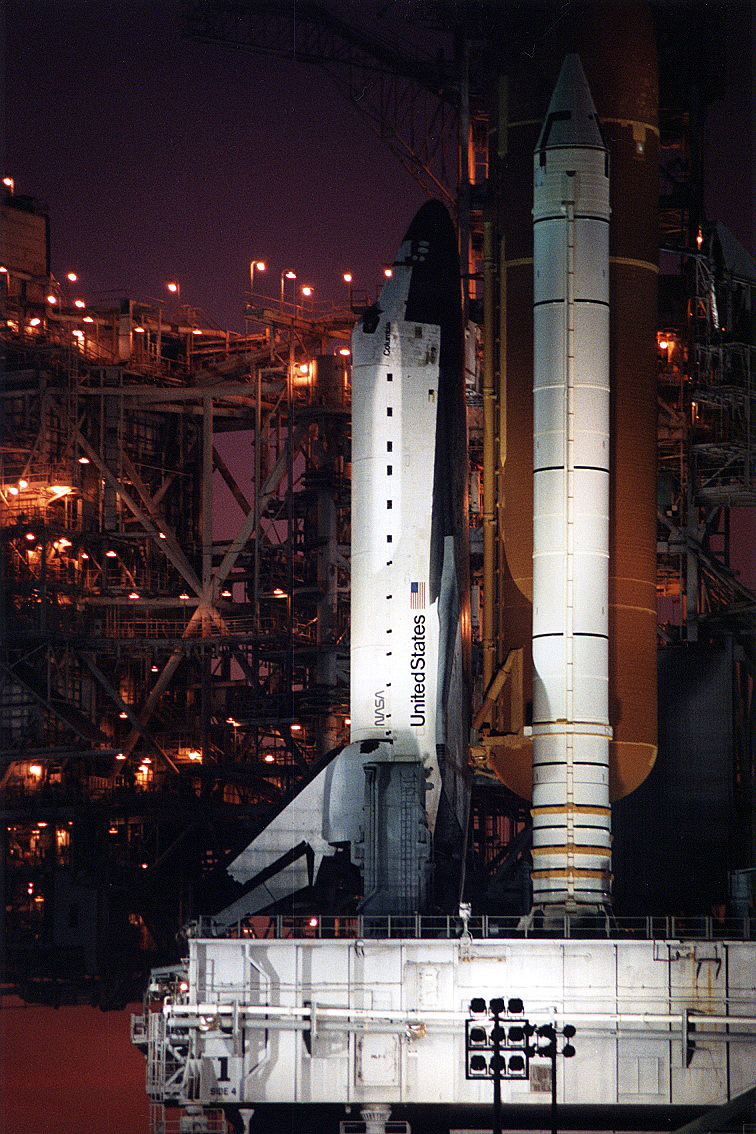
Columbia on Pad 39B

Attempt	Planned	Result	Turnaround	Reason	Decision point	Weather go (%)	Notes
1	14 Oct 1993, 12:53:00 pm	Scrubbed	—	Technical	14 Oct 1993, 12:57 pm (T−00:00:31)	95	The attempt was initially delayed by weather, which later cleared in time for the attempt. However, a problem with the range safety command system occurred and could not be resolved before drainback time expired.
2	15 Oct 1993, 10:53:00 am	Scrubbed	0 days 21 hours 60 minutes	Technical	(T−00:09:00 hold)		The orbiter's S-band transponder 2 failed and had to be replaced. In addition, the weather was once again unacceptable.
3	18 Oct 1993, 10:53:10 am	Success	3 days 0 hours 0 minutes				The countdown was held at T−5 minutes for ten seconds due to an intruding aircraft in the launch area.

STS-58 was a 1993 shuttle mission dedicated to life sciences research. Columbia's crew performed a series of experiments to gain knowledge on how the human body adapts to the weightless environment of space. Experiments focused on cardiovascular, regulatory, DNA, neurovestibular and musculoskeletal systems of the body. The experiments performed on Columbia's crew and on laboratory animals (48 rats held in 24 cages), along with data collected on the SLS-1 mission (STS-40) in June 1991, will provide the most detailed and interrelated physiological measurements acquired in the space environment since the Skylab program in 1973 and 1974.

Crew members conducted experiments aimed at understanding bone tissue loss and the effects of microgravity on sensory perception. Two neurovestibular experiments investigating space motion sickness and perception changes were performed on the 2nd day as well. Astronauts Lucid and Fettman wore a headset, called an Accelerometer Recording Unit (ARU), designed to continually record head movements throughout the day.

Only one minor issue came up on October 19, 1993, associated with a circuit breaker that tripped, cutting off power temporarily to one of the rodent cages in the module. Flight controllers in Houston reported it was not caused by a short in the electrical system and the breaker was reset, restoring power to the cage.

McArthur and Blaha began using the Lower Body Negative Pressure device on flight day 3 (FD 3), which is being tested as a countermeasure for the detrimental effects of microgravity. All three flight crew members will collect urine and saliva samples and keep logs of their exercise and food and fluid intake as part of the Energy Utilization detailed supplementary objective. DSO 612 looks at the nutritial and energy requirements of crew members on long-duration space flights and the relationship between fluid and food consumption.

On October 20, 1993, though the space toilet is working fine, the crew detected a slight leak around the filter door before going to bed. They removed the filter and cleaned up about a teaspoon of water — much less than had been expected. As a precaution, a secondary fan separator unit was used to separate fluid from the air before cycling the air back into the cabin through the filter.

On October 21, 1993, Mission specialists Margaret Rhea Seddon (Payload commander), Shannon Lucid and David Wolf and Payload specialist Martin Fettman collected additional blood and urine samples for the series of metabolic experiments. Some of the samples will follow-up on the calcium absorption experiment performed on October 20, 1993. The experiment, sponsored by Dr. C. D. Arnaud of the University of California, San Francisco, studies the mechanisms of how calcium is maintained and used in bone metabolism in space. Based on preliminary results from the 1991 SLS-1 mission (STS-40), Dr. Arnaud believes the decrease in bone density is due to increased bone breakdown that is not compensated for by a subsequent increase in bone formation.

On October 22, 1993, using the on-board ham radio called SAREX-2 for Shuttle Amateur Radio Experiment, Blaha and Searfoss contacted school children at the Sycamore Middle School in Pleasant View, Tennessee, Gardendale Elementary in Pasadena, Texas and Naparima College in Trinidad and Tobago on November 4, 1993. The Standard Interface Rack (SIR), was tested by Searfoss to demonstrate that equipment can be removed from one rack location and reintegrated into another by a single crew member during orbital operations while maintaining reliable mechanical, data and power interfaces.

Another test flying aboard Columbia was the "Portable In-flight Landing Operations Trainer" (PILOT), a laptop computer simulator that was flown to qualify its use as a tool for helping the mission commander and pilot maintain their proficiency for approach and landing during longer duration Space Shuttle flights. The laptop was controlled using a joy stick hand controller similar to the one used to fly the orbiter in the final minutes before landing. The simulator would continue to see use up to and including the final Shuttle flight (STS-135).

On October 23, 1993, the payload crew members were scheduled to devote much of their time to metabolic studies of the 48 rodents on board the Spacelab science workshop. Payload commander Rhea Seddon, and crewmates David Wolf, Shannon Lucid and veterinarian Marty Fettman were scheduled to draw blood from the tails of some of the rodents, then inject a special isotope into the rodents to measure the volume of their plasma. Another blood draw would follow, to measure how weightlessness may be affecting the red blood cell count of the animals.

After several ham radio contacts around the country and work in a vacuum bag designed to ease the body's readaptation to Earth's environment, the orbiter crew made up of Commander John Blaha, Pilot Richard Searfoss and Mission specialist William McArthur oversaw a short firing of one of the orbital maneuvering system engines to drop the low end of Columbia's orbit from 278 × 263 km (173 × 163 mi) to increase the landing opportunities should the mission be extended for weather or a system problem that would keep the crew in orbit two extra days.

On October 27, 1993, Pilot Rick Searfoss put Columbia through some maneuvers as part of the Orbital Acceleration Research Experiment (OARE). The main goal of the experiment was to accurately measure the aerodynamic forces that act on the shuttle in orbit and during the early stages of entry. The information will be useful to scientists and engineers planning future Spacelab microgravity research flights in which experiments will need a quiet, motion-free environment to produce the best possible data. On October 28, 1993, after enjoying a half a day off, the astronauts aboard Columbia continued to collect scientific data on how humans and animals adapt to the absence of Earth's gravity.

On October 30, Fettman and Seddon decapitated six of the 20 rats. This was done after pre-flight experiments determined that anasthesizing the rats would degrade their tissues and ruin the experiment. The rat tissues would be used after the mission to perform testing on the effects of weightlessness on them. The dissected rat parts were bagged and refrigerated for use in other scientific programs afterwards. The other rats would be examined for their reactions to two weeks of weightlessness and the effects on their physiological condition.

Payload commander Rhea Seddon sent down a special message to her husband, Astronaut Office Chief Robert L. Gibson when she surpassed his total of 632 hours, 56 minutes in space. "He's still a really good guy, I still love him a lot, but I've got more hours in space than he does, so there!" she teased. Seddon acknowledged, however, that he has more launches and landings, having flown four times to her three.

Pilot Rick Searfoss took time out from snapping some infrared photography of the wildfires burning in southern California to say that the crew's thoughts are with the firefighters working to quell the flames and the residents whose homes are being threatened. He said he hoped the fires would be brought under control soon, and added that the photographs he was taking will be among some 4,000 frames that will be returned to Earth for meteorologists, geologists, ecologists and archeologists to study after the flight.

== See also ==
- List of human spaceflights
- List of Space Shuttle missions
- Outline of space science
- Space Shuttle
