= Laurence R. Young =

American aerospace engineer (1935–2021)

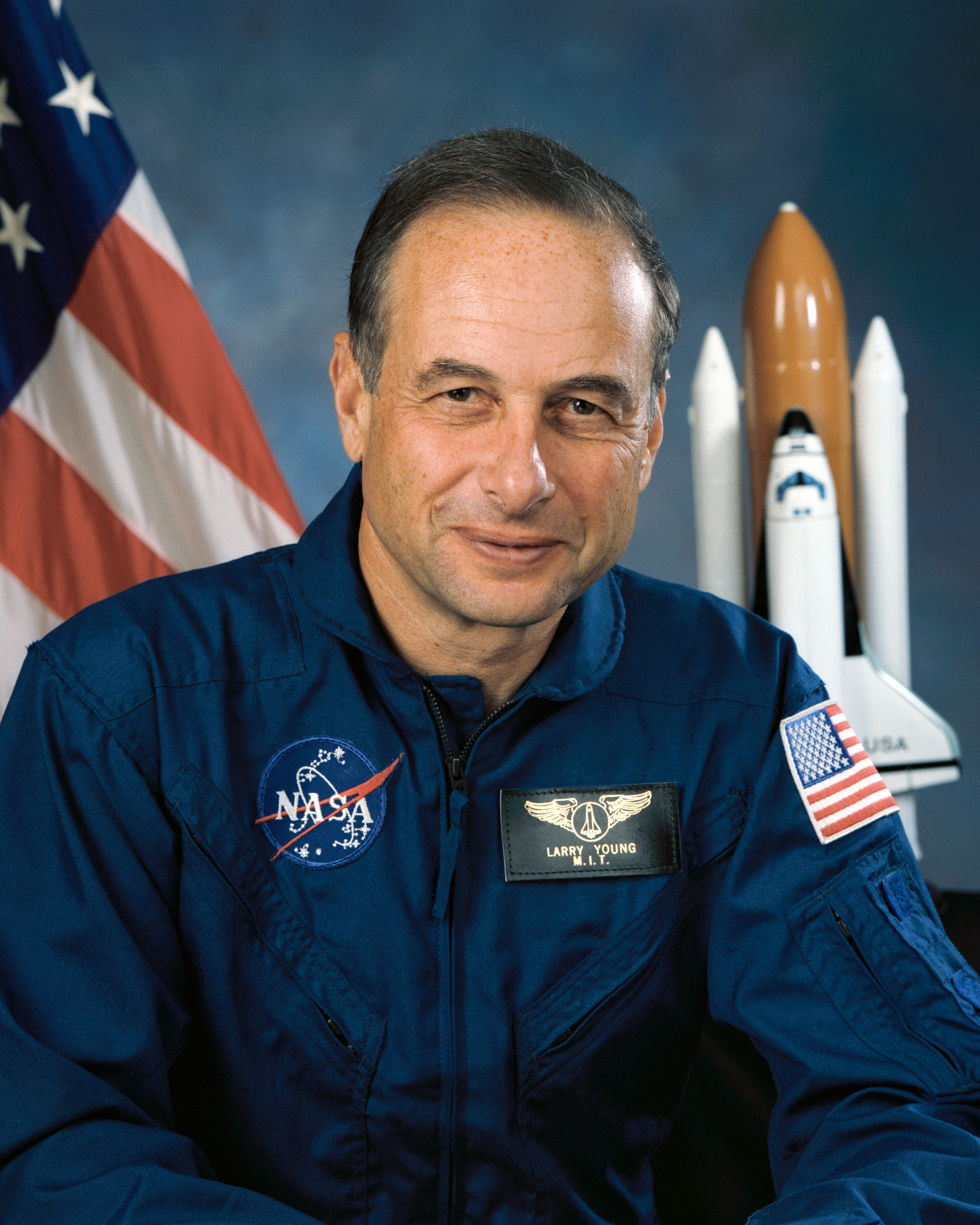
- Portrait in 1992
- Born: Laurence Retman Young; December 19, 1935; New York City, U.S.
- Died: August 4, 2021 (aged 85); Cambridge, Massachusetts, U.S.
- Education: Amherst College (AB); Massachusetts Institute of Technology (SB, SM, ScD)
- Scientific career
- Fields: Bioastronautics; Astronautics; Vestibular physiology; Artificial gravity
- Workplaces: Massachusetts Institute of Technology

Laurence Retman Young (December 19, 1935 – August 4, 2021) was an American aerospace engineer and backup NASA astronaut. He spent his career at the Massachusetts Institute of Technology (MIT), where he joined the faculty in 1962 and in 1995 became the first Apollo Program Professor of Astronautics. He conducted early research in bioastronautics, the study of the effects of spaceflight on the human body, co-founded MIT's Man-Vehicle Laboratory in 1962 and was the founding director of the National Space Biomedical Research Institute in 1997.

Young was known for introducing mathematical modeling techniques to the study of the vestibular system and human factors in flight, and for research on space motion sickness, visual–vestibular interaction, flight simulation, and artificial gravity. He was a backup payload specialist for the Spacelab mission STS-58 in 1993 and was a principal or co-investigator on human orientation experiments flown on seven Space Shuttle missions.

== Early life and education ==
Young was born in New York City on December 19, 1935, to Benjamin and Bess Young. He graduated from the Bronx High School of Science in 1952. He received a Bachelor of Arts from Amherst College in 1957 and, in a combined program, a Bachelor of Science from MIT the same year. In 1958, he earned a certificate in applied mathematics from the University of Paris as a French Government Fellow. He completed a bachelor's and master's degree in electrical engineering at MIT in 1959 and an Doctor of Science in instrumentation there in 1962.

== Career ==
Young joined the faculty of MIT's Department of Aeronautics and Astronautics in 1962. He co-founded the Man-Vehicle Laboratory (later renamed the Human-Systems Laboratory) with Yao-Tzu Li later that year, which conducted research on the visual and vestibular systems, visual-vestibular interactions, flight simulation, space motion sickness, and manual control and displays. Colleagues credited him with being among the first engineers to apply quantitative mathematical modeling to areas of physiology and human factors relevant to aerospace, beginning with eye movements and later extending to perception.

Young's research on how the balance mechanism of the inner ear relates to the space motion sickness experienced by many astronauts led to models used to help humans adapt to spaceflight and to control motion in flight simulators. He was also recognized for work on aerospace applications of manual control theory. In his later career he studied artificial gravity as a countermeasure to the physiological effects of weightlessness, leading a group that built a compact human centrifuge combining a cycle ergometer with rotation intended to fit within a module of the International Space Station(ISS).

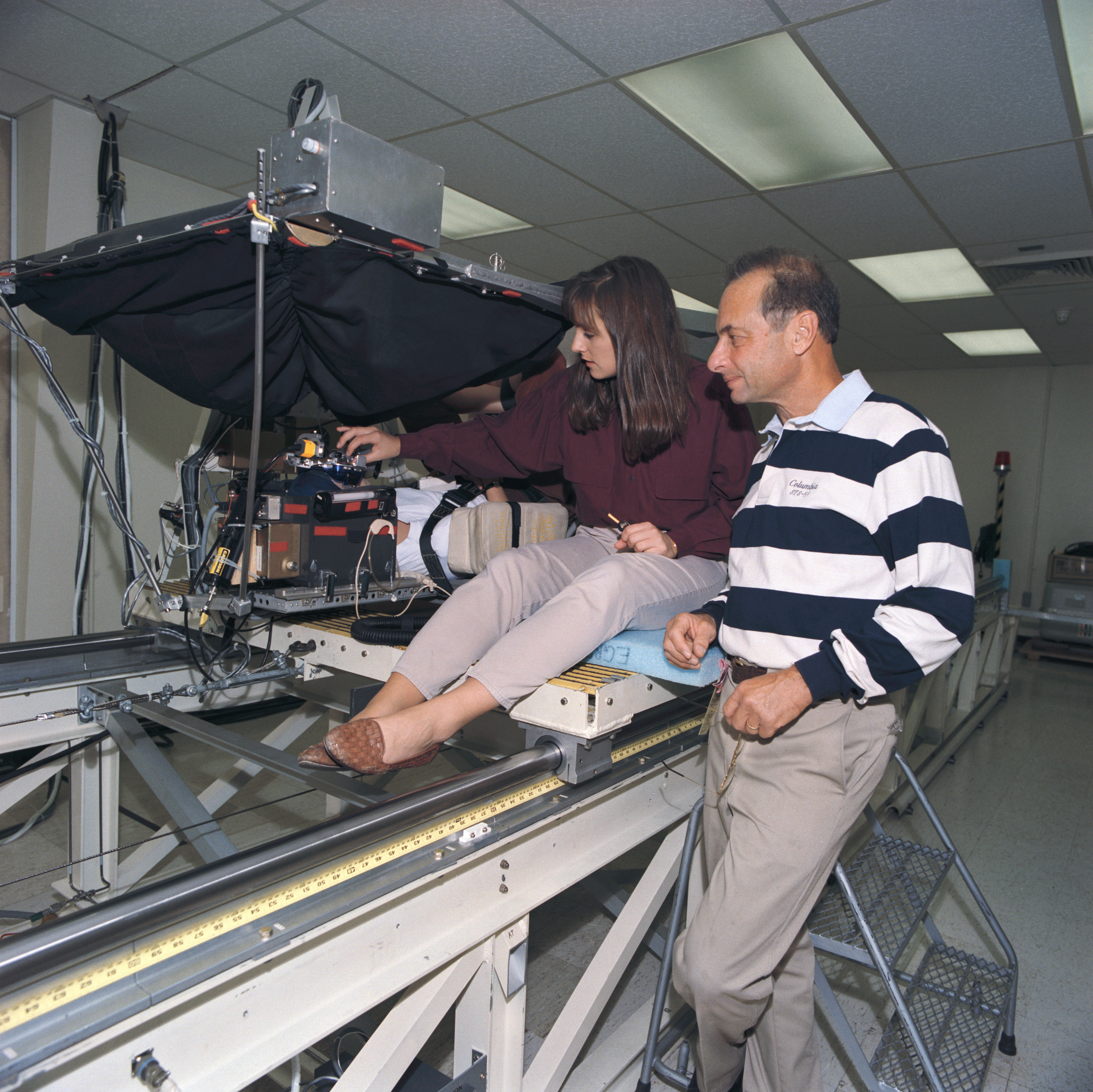
Young and an MIT student collecting data from Martin J. Fettman (face obscured) in an oscillating sled device at MIT to study neurovestibular functions ahead of the STS-58 mission.

In 1995, Young was appointed the first Apollo Program Professor of Astronautics, a chair endowed through a gift initiated by Robert C. Seamans Jr. He also held an appointment as professor of health sciences and technology and launched the Harvard–MIT Program in Health Sciences and Technology (HST) doctoral program in bioastronautics. He developed, with David Mindell, the course "Engineering Apollo: The Moon Project as a Complex System." Over his career he mentored numerous students and colleagues who became prominent in aerospace, among them the astronaut Charlie Duke and the engineer Dava Newman, later NASA Deputy Administrator and his successor in the Apollo Program chair. Young retired in 2013 and continued as a senior advisor in the department.

Beyond MIT, Young consulted for NASA's Marshall Space Flight Center on the Apollo project. He held visiting professorships at ETH Zurich, the Zurich Kantonsspital, the Conservatoire national des arts et métiers in Paris, the Collège de France, the University of Provence in Marseille, and Stanford University. He founded the National Space Biomedical Research Institute and served as its director from 1997 to 2001, directed the Massachusetts Space Grant Consortium, and chaired NASA's Innovative Advanced Concepts External Council.

=== Spaceflight ===
Following two years of training at the Johnson Space Center, Young qualified as a payload specialist for the Space Shuttle's Spacelab biological laboratory. Although he never flew in space, he served as the alternate (backup) payload specialist for Spacelab Life Sciences-2 on mission STS-58 in October 1993. He was a principal or co-investigator on human orientation experiments flown on seven Shuttle missions.

== Awards and honors ==
Young was elected to the National Academy of Engineering and to the Institute of Medicine of the National Academy of Sciences, and was a full member of the International Academy of Astronautics. He was a fellow of the Institute of Electrical and Electronics Engineers, the Biomedical Engineering Society, the American Institute for Medical and Biological Engineering, and the Explorers Club.

His honors included:

- American Institute of Aeronautics and Astronautics (AIAA) Jeffries Aerospace Medicine and Life Sciences Research Award (1992), for his contributions to space biology and medicine as a principal investigator on the Spacelab Life Sciences 1 mission
- NASA Space Act Award for the development of an expert system for astronauts (1995)
- Koetser Foundation Prize, Zurich, for contributions to neuroscience (1998)
- National Space Biomedical Research Institute Pioneer Award (2013)
- AIAA de Florez Award for Flight Simulation (2018)
- Aerospace Medical Association Professional Excellence Award for Lifetime Contributions (2018)

== Ski safety research ==
An avid skier, Young became active in ski-injury research. He was a director of the International Society for Skiing Safety and chaired the Ski Injury Statistics Subcommittee of the American Society for Testing and Materials committee on snow skiing, and was elected committee chair in 1987. He received the United States Ski Association Award of Merit and a Best Research Paper Award from the American Academy of Orthopaedic Surgeons.

== Personal life and death ==
Young was married to Vicki Goldberg; his first wife, Jody Williams, was the mother of his three children, Eliot, Leslie, and Robert Young. He died at his home in Cambridge, Massachusetts, on August 4, 2021, at the age of 85, after a long illness.
