= William S. McArthur =

American astronaut (born 1951)

William McArthur
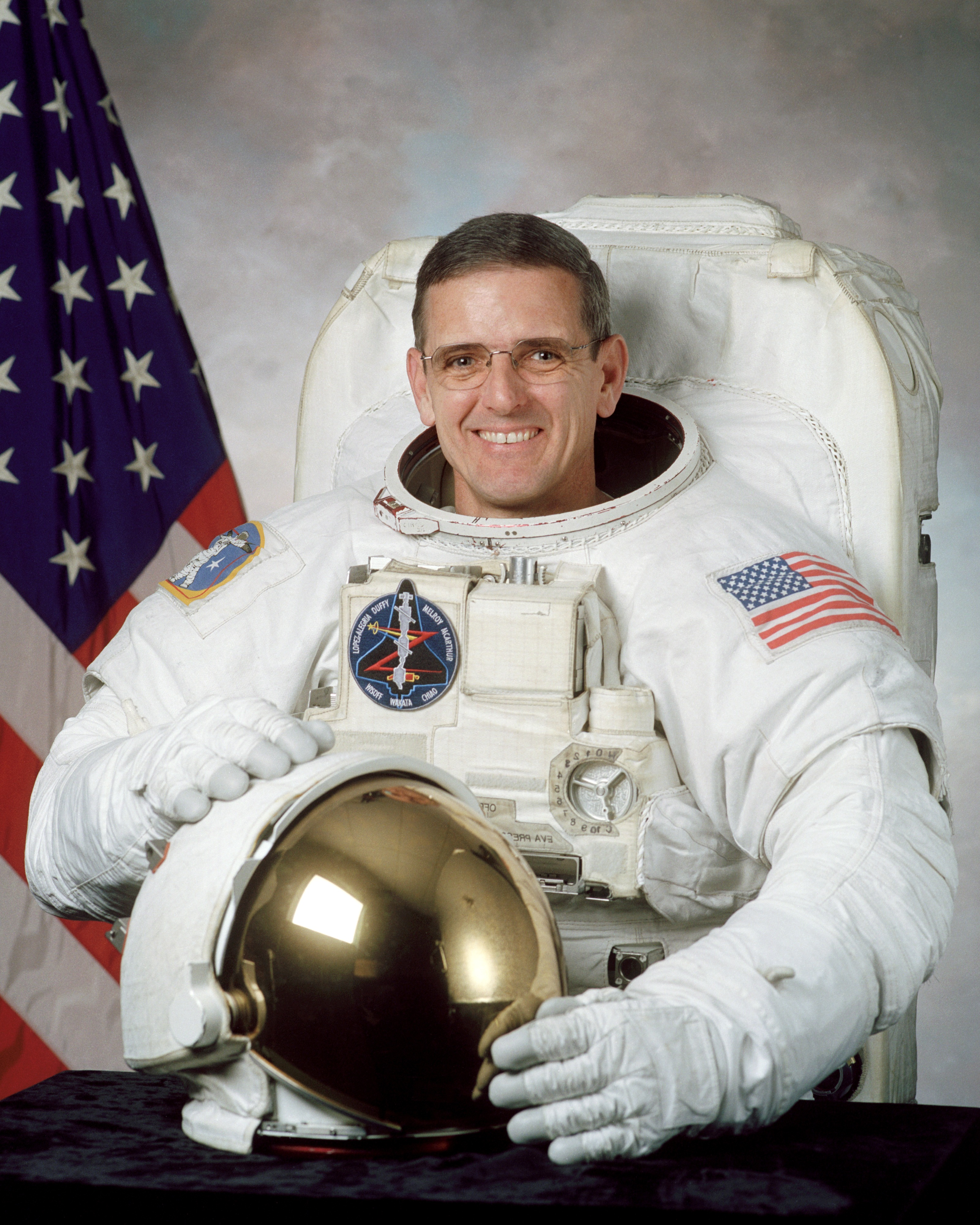
- McArthur in 2000
- Born: William Surles McArthur Jr. July 26, 1951 (age 75); Laurinburg, North Carolina, U.S.
- Education: United States Military Academy (BS); Georgia Institute of Technology (MS)
- Space career

NASA astronaut
- Rank: Colonel, USA
- Time in space: 224d 22h 19m
- Selection: NASA Group 13 (1990)
- Total EVAs: 4
- Total EVA time: 24h, 1m
- Missions: STS-58; STS-74; STS-92; Soyuz TMA-7 (Expedition 12)
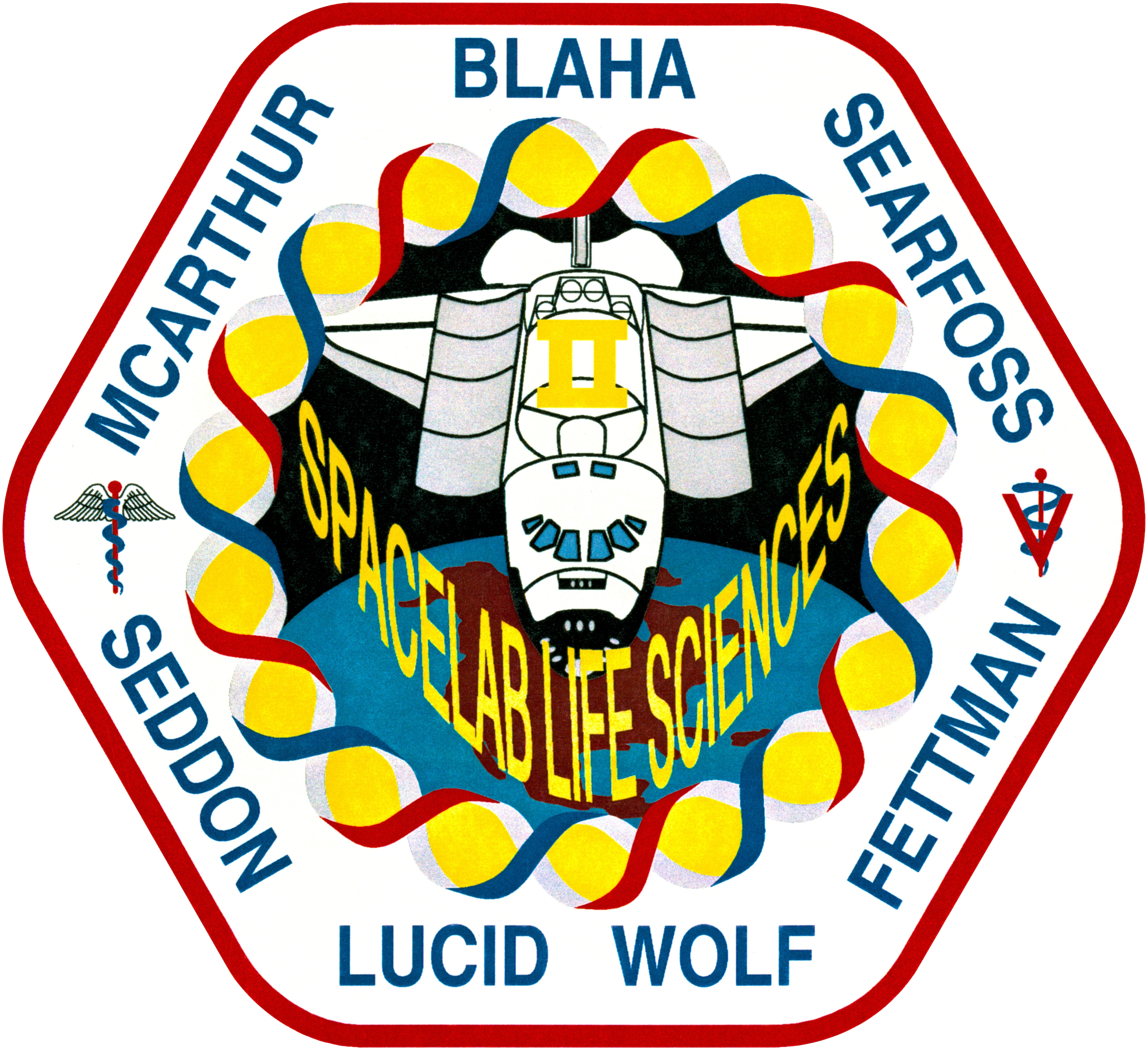
- Mission insignia
- Retired: July 18, 2017

William Surles McArthur Jr. (born July 26, 1951) is a retired United States Army colonel and NASA astronaut and a veteran of three Space Shuttle missions and one expedition to the International Space Station via the Russian Soyuz capsule.

== Army career and education ==
Born July 26, 1951, and raised in Red Springs, North Carolina, McArthur was active in the Boy Scouts of America where he achieved its second highest rank, Life Scout. He attended the U.S. Military Academy, graduating with a Bachelor of Science degree in applied science and engineering in 1973, and earned his commission in the U.S. Army. After serving with the 82nd Airborne Division at Fort Bragg, North Carolina, McArthur attended the U.S. Army Aviation School and served tours of duty in Korea and Georgia, where he earned a Master of Science degree in aerospace engineering from the Georgia Institute of Technology in 1983.

== NASA career ==
In 1987, McArthur attended the U.S. Naval Test Pilot School and was trained as an experimental test pilot. He was assigned to a post as a flight test engineer at NASA and was selected as an astronaut candidate in 1990. McArthur's first spaceflight was in 1993 aboard STS-58. Subsequent missions included STS-74 in 1995 and STS-92 in 2000.

A Master Army Aviator, McArthur has logged over 9,000 flight hours in 41 different aircraft and spacecraft.

McArthur is the recipient of a number of prestigious awards and honors including the Army Distinguished Service Medal, the Defense Superior Service Medal, the Defense Meritorious Service Medal (Oak leaf cluster), the NASA Distinguished Service Medal, the NASA Exceptional Service Medal and the NASA Space Flight Medal. He retired from the U.S. Army in 2001.

McArthur was on board the International Space Station as a member of Expedition 12, having been launched on Soyuz TMA-7. He lived aboard the station from October 3, 2005, until April 8, 2006.

McArthur served as the Director of Safety and Mission Assurance for the Johnson Space Center until his retirement in June of 2017.

=== Expedition 12 ===
In April 2006, McArthur and Expedition 13 flight officer Jeffrey Williams tested a new method of preparing for spacewalks by "camping out" or spending the night in the Quest airlock, the decompression capsule through which astronauts enter and exit space. In the chamber the pressure was reduced from the normal 14.7 pounds per square inch (psi) to 10.2 psi. The more commonly used method of preparing for spacewalks involves breathing pure oxygen for several hours to purge the body of nitrogen and avoid the bends. The "campout" method was intended to shorten that lengthy preparation time. Four hours into their sleep an error tone prompted mission controllers to cut short the activity, though it was still deemed a success.

== Personal life ==
McArthur is married to the former Cynthia Kathryn Lovin with two daughters, and enjoys cycling, photography, and working with personal computers. In May 2009 he was awarded an honorary doctorate from the University of Strathclyde in recognition of his contribution to space science and engineering, as well as his outreach work with the Scottish Space School. He resides in Friendswood, Texas.

== Awards ==
Ribbon	Description	Notes
	Army Distinguished Service Medal	
	Defense Superior Service Medal	
	Defense Meritorious Service Medal	
	Army Commendation Medal	
	National Defense Service Medal	with one award star
	Army Service Ribbon	
	NASA Distinguished Service Medal	
	NASA Exceptional Service Medal	
	NASA Space Flight Medal	with three oak leaf clusters

Preceded by Sergei Krikalev	ISS Expedition Commander; October 3, 2005 to April 8, 2006	Succeeded by Pavel Vinogradov
