= Baudry =

Baudry may refer to:

- André Baudry (1922–2018), French writer
- Antonin Baudry (born 1975), French diplomat
- Armand Léon de Baudry d'Asson (1836–1915), French Legitimist politician
- Christian Baudry (born 1955), French footballer
- Gabriel Taschereau de Baudry, seigneur de Baudry (1673–1755), French administrator
- Guillaume Baudry (1657–1732), Canadian gunsmith and gold and silversmith
- Jacques Baudry de Lamarche (1676–c.1738), Canadian proprietor
- Jean-Baptiste Baudry (1684–1755), Canadian gunsmith and gold and silversmith
- Jean-Louis Baudry (1930–2015), French novelist
- Louis-Narcisse Baudry Des Lozieres (1761–1841), French refugee and explorer
- Marie-Victoire Baudry (1782–1846), French nun
- Marvin Baudry (born 1990), Congolese footballer
- Mathieu Baudry (born 1988), French footballer
- Olivier Baudry (footballer, born 1970), French
- Olivier Baudry (1973–2017), French footballer
- Patrick Baudry (born 1946), French pilot and astronaut
- Paul-Jacques-Aimé Baudry (1828–1886), French painter

== See also ==
- Baldric (disambiguation), for persons with the given name Baudry
