= STS-51-G =

1985 American crewed spaceflight to deploy communications satellites

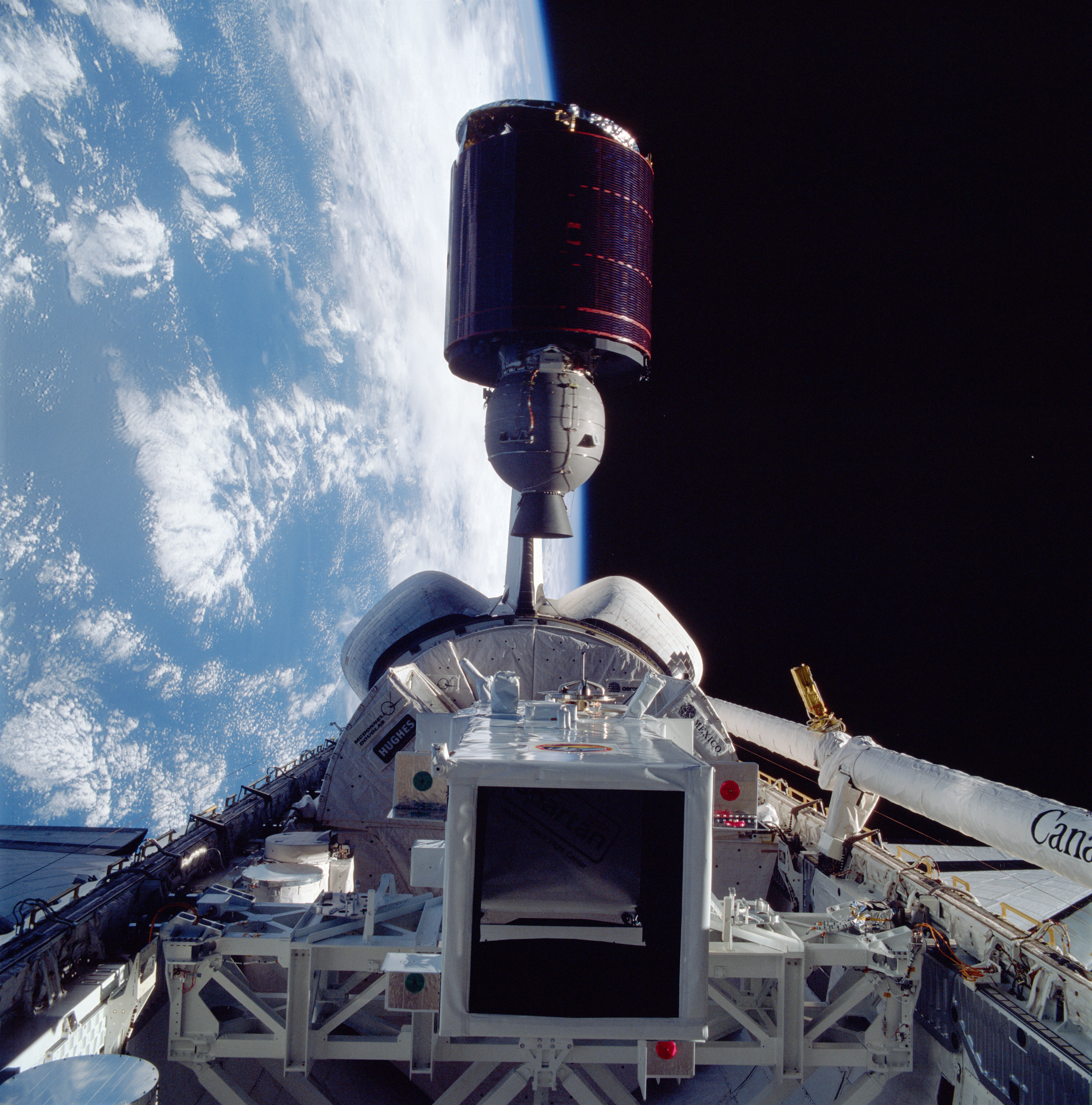
- Discovery deploys Morelos-1.
- Names: Space Transportation System-18
- Mission type: Satellites deployment
- Operator: NASA
- COSPAR ID: 1985-048A
- SATCAT no.: 15823
- Mission duration: 7 days, 1 hour, 38 minutes, 52 seconds
- Distance travelled: 4,693,051 km (2,916,127 mi)
- Orbits completed: 112

Spacecraft properties
- Spacecraft: Space Shuttle Discovery
- Launch mass: 116,357 kg (256,523 lb)
- Landing mass: 92,610 kg (204,170 lb)
- Payload mass: 17,280 kg (38,100 lb)

Crew
- Crew size: 7
- Members: Daniel C. Brandenstein; John O. Creighton; Shannon W. Lucid; Steven R. Nagel; John M. Fabian; Patrick Baudry; Sultan bin Salman Al Saud

Start of mission
- Launch date: June 17, 1985, 11:33:00 UTC (7:33 am EDT)
- Launch site: Kennedy, LC-39A
- Contractor: Rockwell International

End of mission
- Landing date: June 24, 1985, 13:11:52 UTC (6:11:52 am PDT)
- Landing site: Edwards, Runway 23

Orbital parameters
- Reference system: Geocentric orbit
- Regime: Low Earth orbit
- Perigee altitude: 353 km (219 mi)
- Apogee altitude: 359 km (223 mi)
- Inclination: 28.45°
- Period: 91.70 minutes

Instruments
- Automated Directional Solidification Furnace (ADSF); French Echocardiograph Experiment (FEE); French Postural Experiment (FPE); High Precision Tracking Experiment (HPTE); Shuttle Pointed Autonomous Research Tool for AstroNomy (SPARTAN-1)
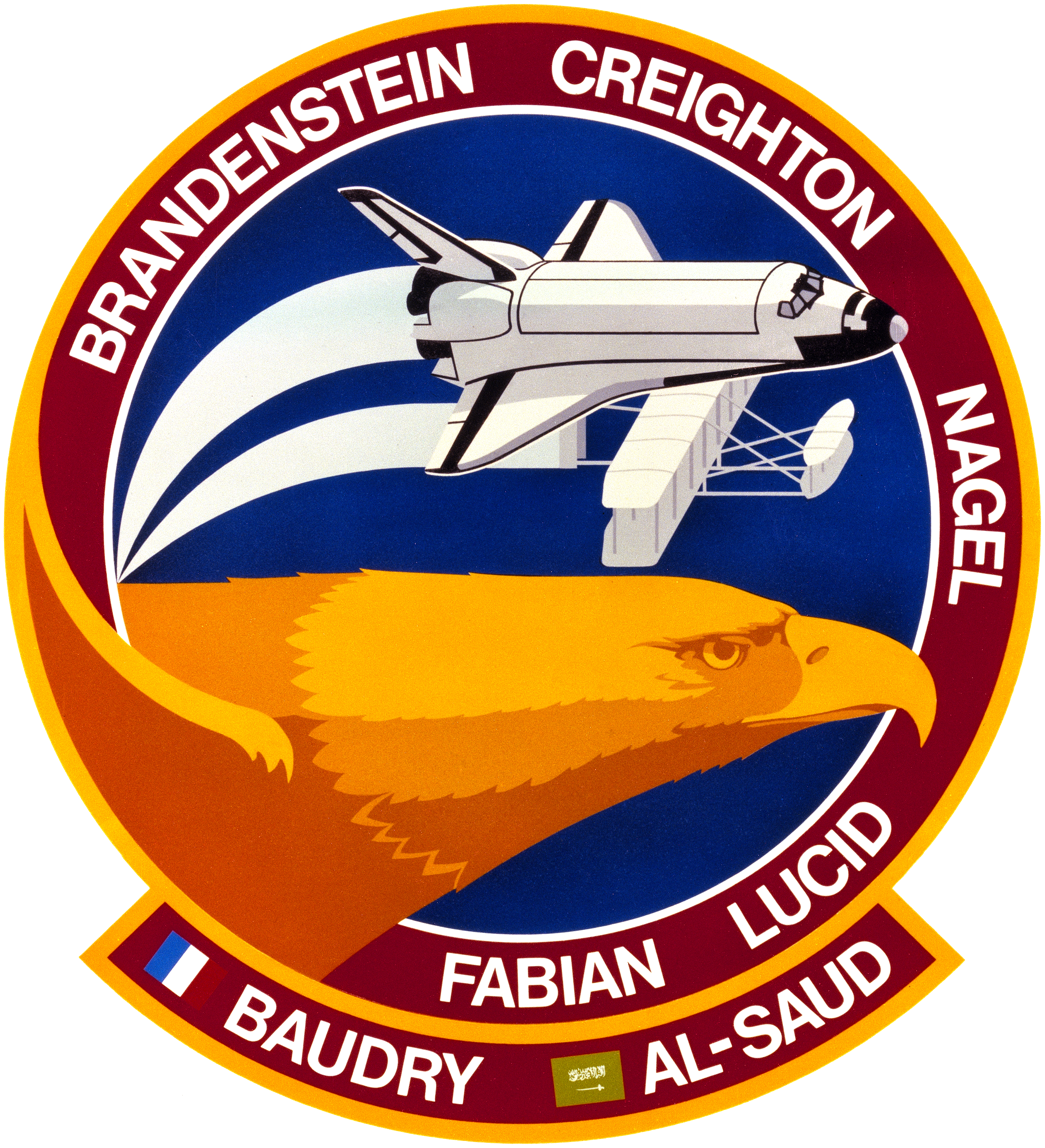
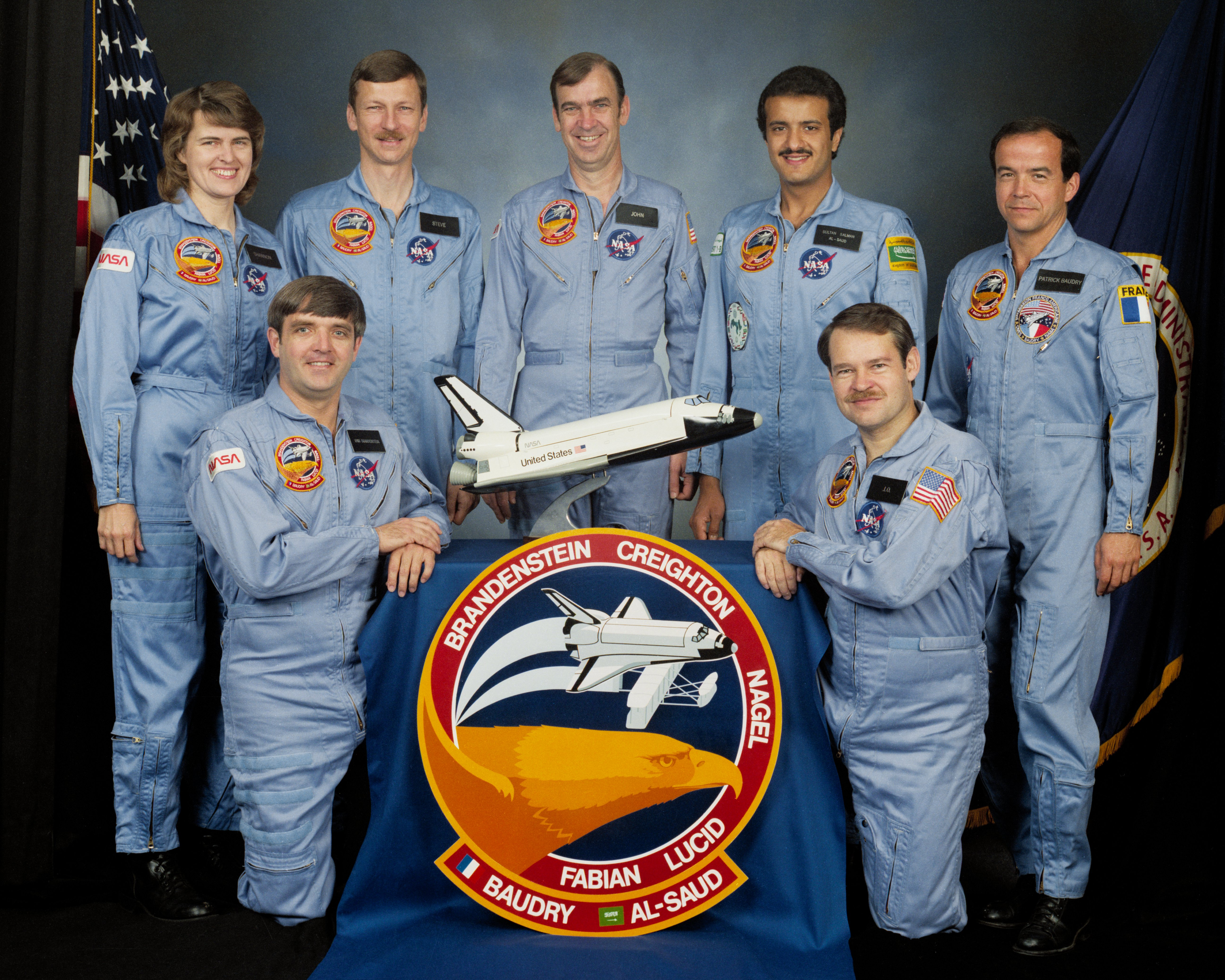
- STS-51-G mission patch Back: Lucid, Nagel, Fabian, Al Saud and Baudry; Front: Brandenstein and Creighton Space Shuttle program

STS-51-G was the 18th flight of NASA's Space Shuttle program, and the fifth flight of Space Shuttle Discovery. The seven-day mission launched from Kennedy Space Center, Florida, on June 17, 1985, and landed at Edwards Air Force Base, California, on June 24, 1985. Sultan bin Salman Al Saud from Saudi Arabia was on board as a payload specialist; Al Saud became the first Arab, the first Muslim, and the first member of a royal family to fly into space. It was also the first Space Shuttle mission which flew without at least one astronaut from the pre-Shuttle era among its crew.

== Crew ==
Position	Astronaut
Commander	(United States) Daniel C. Brandenstein; Second spaceflight
Pilot	(United States) John O. Creighton; First spaceflight
Mission Specialist 1	(United States) John M. Fabian; Second and last spaceflight
Mission Specialist 2 Flight Engineer	(United States) Steven R. Nagel; First spaceflight
Mission Specialist 3	(United States) Shannon W. Lucid; First spaceflight
Payload Specialist 1	(France) Patrick Baudry, CNES; Only spaceflight
Payload Specialist 2	(Saudi Arabia) Sultan bin Salman Al Saud, RSAF; Only spaceflight

=== Backup crew ===
Position	Astronaut
Payload Specialist 1	(France) Jean-Loup Chrétien, CNES
Payload Specialist 2	(Saudi Arabia) Abdulmohsen Al-Bassam, RSAF

=== Crew seat assignments ===
Seat	Launch	Landing	Seats 1–4 are on the flight deck. Seats 5–7 are on the mid-deck.
1	Brandenstein		Seats 1–4 are on the flight deck. Seats 5–7 are on the mid-deck.
2	Creighton		Seats 1–4 are on the flight deck. Seats 5–7 are on the mid-deck.
3	Lucid	Fabian	Seats 1–4 are on the flight deck. Seats 5–7 are on the mid-deck.
4	Nagel		Seats 1–4 are on the flight deck. Seats 5–7 are on the mid-deck.
5	Fabian	Lucid	Seats 1–4 are on the flight deck. Seats 5–7 are on the mid-deck.
6	Baudry		Seats 1–4 are on the flight deck. Seats 5–7 are on the mid-deck.
7	Al Saud		Seats 1–4 are on the flight deck. Seats 5–7 are on the mid-deck.

== Mission summary ==
Discovery lifted off from Launch Complex 39A, Kennedy Space Center (KSC), at 7:33 a.m. EDT on June 17, 1985. The mission's crew members included Daniel C. Brandenstein, commander; John O. Creighton, pilot; Shannon W. Lucid, Steven R. Nagel, and John M. Fabian, mission specialists; and Patrick Baudry, from France, and Prince Sultan Sultan bin Salman Al Saud, from Saudi Arabia, both payload specialists.

STS-51-G carried three communications satellites as its primary cargo. These were Arabsat-1B (Arab Satellite Communications Organization); Morelos-1 (Mexico); and Telstar-303 (AT&T Corporation). All three successfully utilized Payload Assist Module (PAM-D) booster stages to achieve geostationary transfer orbits (GTO) after being deployed from Discovery.

Also carried was the SPARTAN-1 (Shuttle Pointed Autonomous Research Tool for AstroNomy) a deployable/retrievable carrier module, designed to be deployed from the orbiter and fly free in space before being retrieved. SPARTAN-1 included 140 kg (310 lb) of astronomy experiments. It was deployed and operated successfully, independent of the orbiter, before being retrieved. Discovery furthermore carried an experimental materials-processing furnace, two French biomedical experiments (French Echocardiograph Experiment (FEE) and French Postural Experiment (FPE)), and six Getaway Special (GAS) experiments, which were all successfully performed, although the GO34 Getaway Special shut down prematurely. This mission was also the first flight test of the OEX advanced autopilot which gave the orbiter capabilities above and beyond those of the baseline system.

The mission's final payload element was a High Precision Tracking Experiment (HPTE) for the Strategic Defense Initiative (SDI) (nicknamed "Star Wars"); the HPTE failed to deploy properly during its first try on the mission's 37th orbit, because the orbiter was not at the correct attitude. It was successfully deployed on orbit 64.

Discovery landed at Edwards Air Force Base at 9:11:52 a.m. EDT on June 24, 1985, after a mission duration of 7 days, 1 hour, 38 minutes, and 52 seconds.

== Mission Insignia ==
The STS-51-G insignia illustrates the advances in aviation technology in the United States within a relatively short span of the twentieth century with Discovery flying over the Wright Flyer. A gold-and-orange-flame eagle forms the base of the insigna. The surnames of the crewmembers for the Discovery's mission appear near the center edge of the circular design, with the French and Saudi crewmembers added below, with a respective flag icon along their name. Although Baudry was the first French citizen to fly with a Space Shuttle mission into space, he was only the second Frenchman to go to space, following Jean-Loup Chrétien's earlier missions with Soyuz capsule, Soyuz T-6.

== Wake-up calls ==
NASA began a tradition of playing music to astronauts during Project Gemini, and first used music to wake up a flight crew during Apollo 15. Each track is specially chosen, often by the astronauts' families, and usually has a special meaning to an individual member of the crew, or is applicable to their daily activities.

Flight Day	Song	Artist/Composer
Day 2	"Eye in the Sky (song)"	The Alan Parsons Project
Day 3	"Proud Mary"	Creedence Clearwater Revival
Day 4	"Sailing"	Christopher Cross
Day 5	"Jonathan Livingston Seagull"	Neil Diamond
Day 6	"Wedding March"	Felix Mendelssohn

== Gallery ==
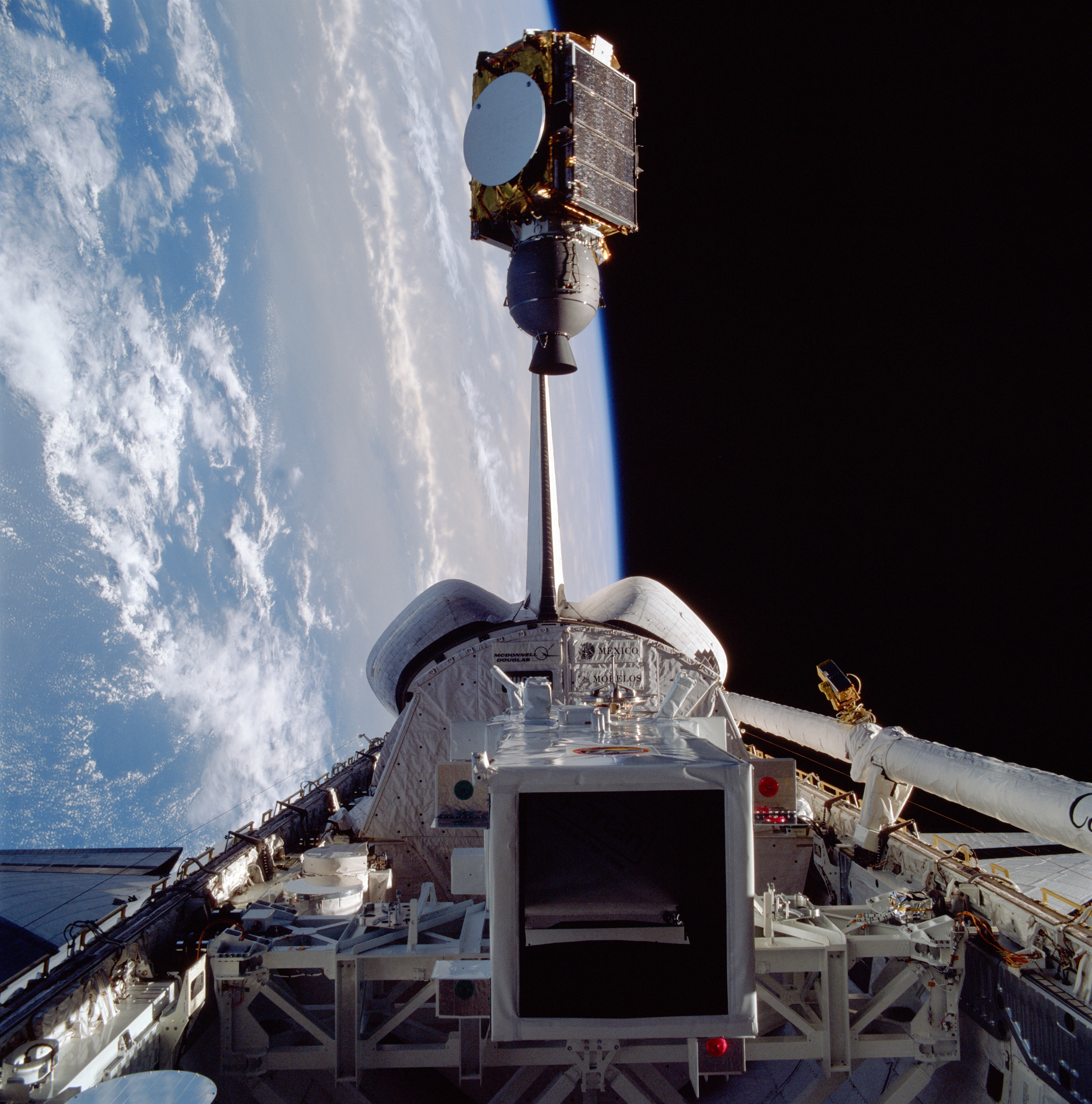
Arabsat-1B deployment

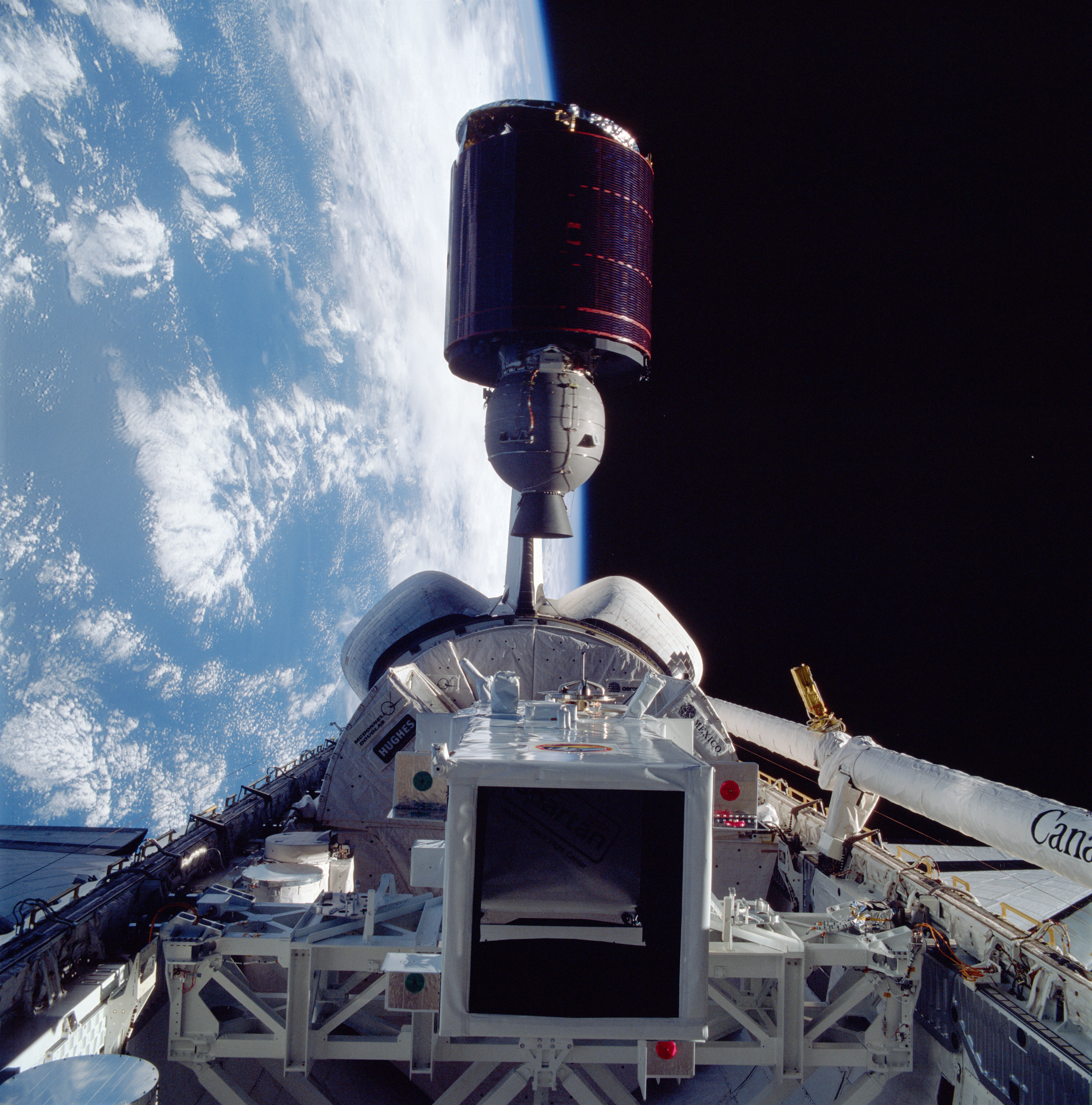
Morelos-1 deployment

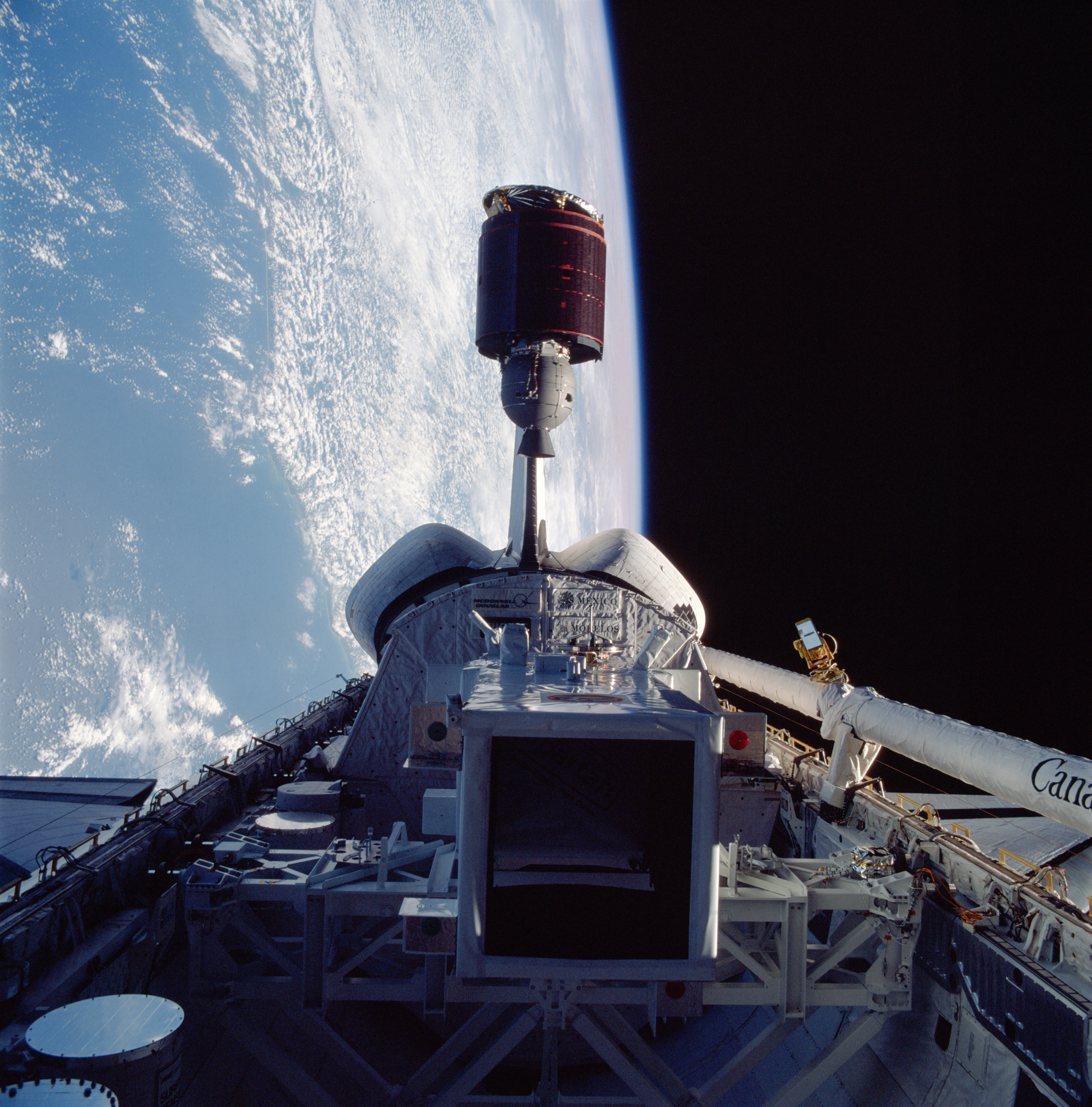
Telstar-303 deployment

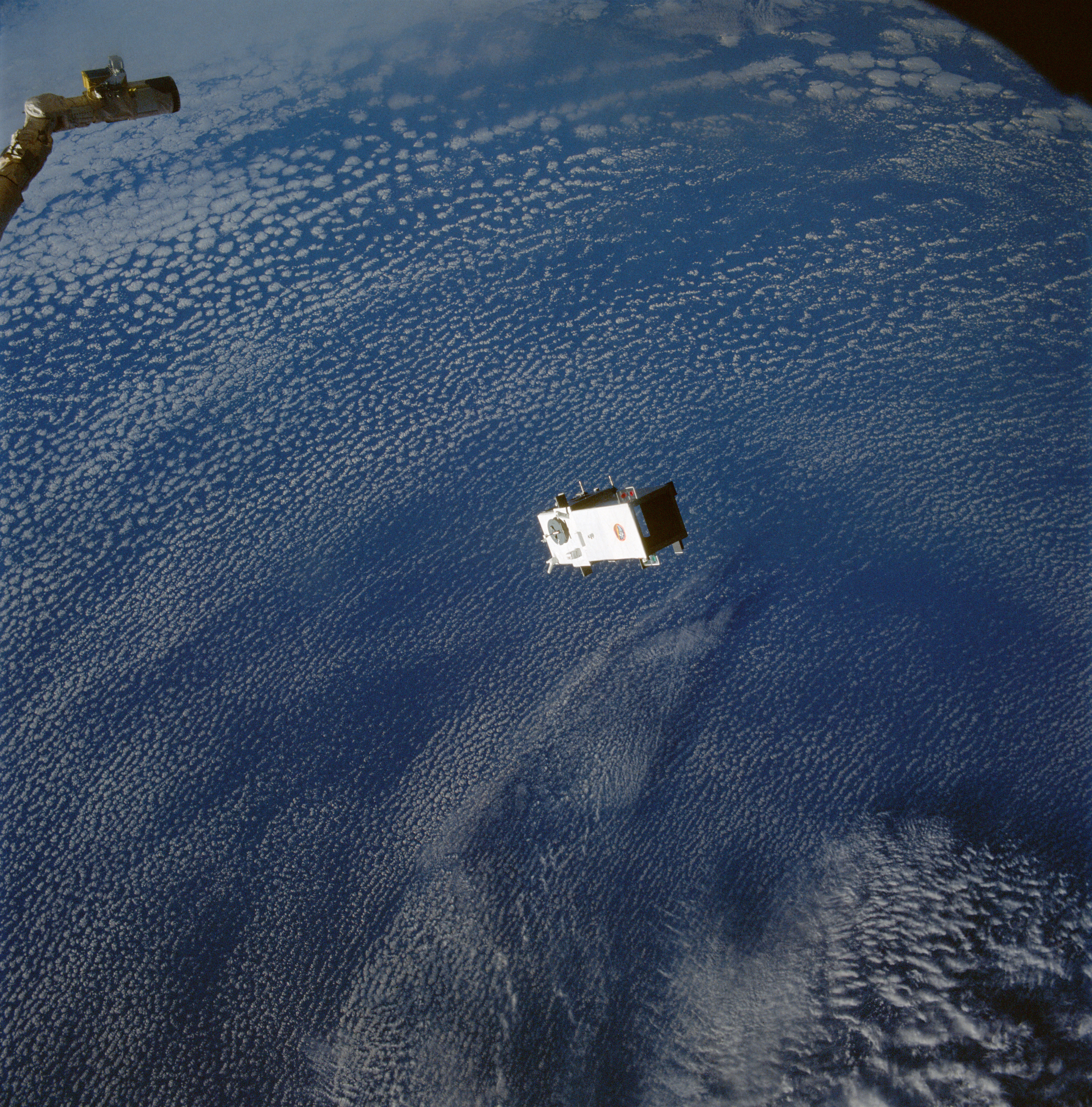
SPARTAN-1 after deployment

== See also ==
- List of human spaceflights
- List of Space Shuttle missions
