= John M. Fabian =

American astronaut (1939–2026)

John Fabian
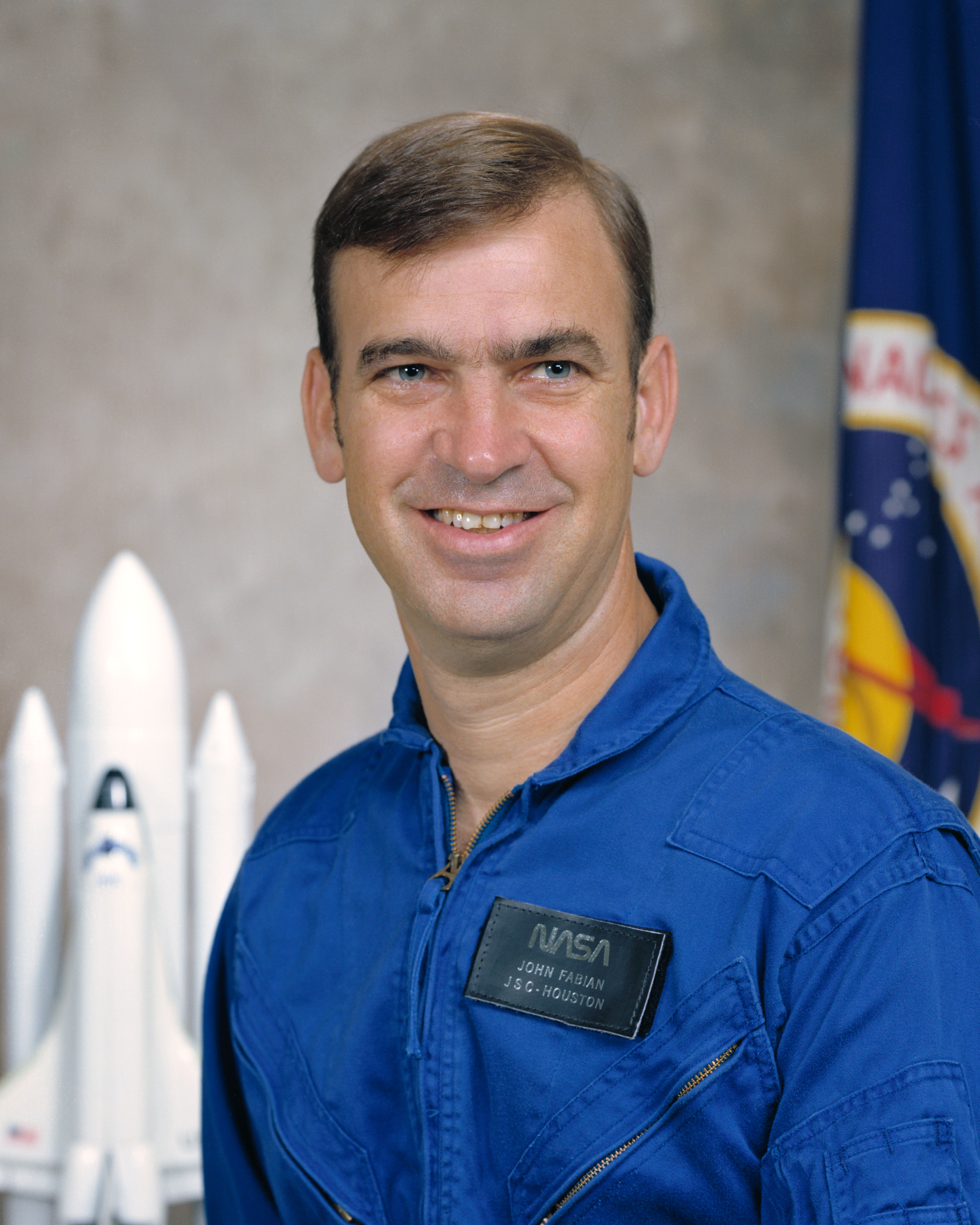
- Born: John McCreary Fabian; January 28, 1939; Goose Creek, Texas, U.S.
- Died: May 21, 2026 (aged 87); Port Ludlow, Washington, U.S.
- Education: Washington State University (BS); Air University (MS); University of Washington (ScD)
- Space career

NASA astronaut
- Rank: Colonel, USAF
- Time in space: 13d 4h 2m
- Selection: NASA Group 8 (1978)
- Missions: STS-7; STS-51-G

John McCreary Fabian (January 28, 1939 – May 21, 2026) was an American NASA astronaut and Air Force officer who flew two Space Shuttle missions and worked on the development of the Shuttle's robotic arm. He later led the Air Force's space operations.

== Background ==
Fabian was born on January 28, 1939, in Goose Creek, Texas, but considered Pullman, Washington, to be his hometown. He was active in the Boy Scouts of America where he achieved its second-highest rank, Life Scout. His recreational interests included politics and environmental advocacy.

In 1998 he retired to Port Ludlow, Washington, bordered by Hood Canal and the Olympic Mountains on northwest Washington's Olympic Peninsula. In 2002 he helped form the Hood Canal Coalition, an environmental watchdog group opposing a new industrial harbor complex and a gravel mine's shipping operation slated to transverse the Hood Canal Bridge.

From 2000 to 2011, he participated in the "Lunch with an Astronaut" and "Astronaut Encounter" events at the Kennedy Space Center Visitor Complex. He resumed his involvement in 2022, and had been a regular feature in the restructured "Chat with an Astronaut" program, as well as "Astronaut Encounter".

Fabian died on May 21, 2026, at the age of 87.

== Education ==
Graduated from Pullman High School, Pullman, Washington, in 1957; received a Bachelor of Science degree in mechanical engineering from Washington State University in 1962; a Master of Science degree in aerospace engineering from the U.S. Air Force Institute of Technology in 1964; and a doctorate in aeronautics and astronautics from the University of Washington in 1974. While at Washington State University, he was a member of the Phi Sigma Kappa fraternity. Member of Tau Beta Pi and Sigma Tau engineering honor societies. WSU Commander of Arnold Air Society 1960–61.

== Military experience ==
Fabian, an Air Force ROTC student at Washington State University, was commissioned upon graduation in 1962. After an assignment at the U.S. Air Force Institute of Technology at Wright-Patterson Air Force Base, Ohio, he was assigned as an aeronautics engineer in the service engineering division, San Antonio Air Material Area, Kelly Air Force Base, Texas. He then attended flight training at Williams Air Force Base, Arizona, and subsequently spent 5 years as a KC-135 co-pilot, aircraft commander, and instructor pilot at Wurtsmith Air Force Base, Michigan. He saw action in Southeast Asia, flying 90 combat missions during the Vietnam War. Following additional graduate work at the University of Washington, he served 4 years on the faculty of the Aeronautics Department at the U.S. Air Force Academy in Colorado where he was a tenured associate professor.

He logged 4,000 hours flying time, including 3,400 hours in jet aircraft.

== NASA experience ==
Fabian was selected as an astronaut candidate by NASA in January 1978, and became an astronaut in August 1979. During the following years, he worked extensively on satellite deployment and retrieval activities, including development of the Canadian Remote Manipulator System. A veteran of two space flights, he logged over 316 hours in space. He served as a mission specialist on STS-7 (June 18 – 24, 1983) and STS-51G (June 17–24, 1985). He was scheduled to fly next in May 1986 on STS-61G, and was also in training for space shuttle life science mission SLS-1. Fabian instead left NASA on January 1, 1986, to become Director of Space, Deputy Chief of Staff, Plans and Operations, Headquarters USAF.

He retired from the USAF in June 1987 and joined Analytic Services, a non-profit aerospace public service research institute in Arlington, Virginia, where he retired as president and chief executive officer in 1998. He lived in Port Ludlow, Washington. Fabian continued to serve as an independent consultant and public speaker on the NASA space program and environmental stewardship.

=== Space flight experience ===
Fabian first flew as a mission specialist on STS-7, which launched from Kennedy Space Center, Florida, on June 18, 1983. This was the second flight for the Orbiter Challenger and for the first mission with a 5-person crew. During the mission, the crew deployed satellites for Canada (ANIK C-2) and Indonesia (PALAPA B-1); operated the Canadian-built Remote Manipulator System (RMS) to perform the first deployment and retrieval exercise with the Shuttle Pallet Satellite (SPAS-01); conducted the first formation flying of the Orbiter with a free-flying satellite (SPAS-01); carried and operated the first U.S./German cooperative materials science payload (OSTA-2): and operated the Continuous Flow Electrophoresis System (CFES) and the Monodisperse Latex Reactor (MLR) experiments, in addition to activating seven Getaway Specials, Mission duration was 147 hours before landing at Edwards Air Force Base, California, on June 24, 1983.

He was the first person to deploy and subsequently retrieve a free-flying satellite. In doing so, he used the Canadian-built robotic arm to release and later recapture the SPAS-01 satellite.

On his second mission, Fabian flew on STS-51-G which launched from the Kennedy Space Center, Florida, on June 17, 1985, and landed at Edwards Air Force Base, California, on June 24, 1985, after completing approximately 170 hours of space flight. This international crew deployed communications satellites for Mexico (Morelos), the Arab League (Arabsat), and the United States (AT&T Telstar). They used the Remote Manipulator System (RMS) to deploy and later retrieve the SPARTAN satellite which performed 17 hours of x-ray astronomy experiments while separated from the Space Shuttle. In addition, the crew activated the Automated Directional Solidification Furnace (ADSF), six Getaway Specials, participated in biomedical experiments, and conducted a laser tracking experiment as part of the Strategic Defense Initiative.

== Associations ==
Fellow, American Institute of Aeronautics and Astronautics; Fellow, American Astronautical Society; President, Association of Space Explorers - USA; Member, International Academy of Astronautics; Vice President, International Astronautical Federation; Served 4 terms as International Co-president of the Association of Space Explorers. Trustee, Washington State University Foundation. Trustee, Phi Sigma Kappa Foundation. Served with the Presidential Commission Investigating the Space Shuttle Challenger Accident and the Presidential Commission on Design of the International Space Station. Member of NASA Advisory Committees on the Joint US-Russian Space Shuttle - MIR Program and the International Space Station Operation and Utilization. Member, Advisory Committee, Georgia Tech Research Institute.

Founder of Hood Canal Coalition, a statewide organization of nearly 4000 members with the support of more than 60 other, independent environmental, political, recreational, tribal, and community groups. The coalition opposes the industrialization of Hood Canal and the development of a harbor complex intended to load strip-mined gravel onto ships the size of aircraft carriers and barges the size of football fields. Major national, state, regional and local elected officials support the work of the coalition.

Knight or Chevalier, Confrerie des Chevaliers du Tastevin, Nuits-Saint-Georges, France, 1989. Honorary Commander, Commanderie du Bontemps, Pulliac France, 1985.

== Honors ==
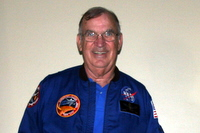
Fabian at the Kennedy Space Center in 2010

Air Force Astronaut Wings; NASA Space Flight Medal with one Oak Leaf Cluster; NASA Exceptional Public Service Medal; Fédération Aéronautique Internationale - Komarov Diploma; Defense Superior Service Medal with one Oak Leaf Cluster, Legion of Merit, Defense Meritorious Service Medal, Air Force Meritorious Service Medal; French Legion of Honor, Saudi Arabian King Abdul Aziz Medal; Air Medal with 2 Oak Leaf Clusters; Air Force Commendation Medal; Washington State University Sloan Engineering Award (1961); Air Training Command Academic Training Award (1966); Squadron Officer School Commandant's Trophy (1968); Squadron Officer School Chief of Staff Award (1968); Washington State University Distinguished Alumnus Award (1983); University of Washington Distinguished Alumnus Award, Aeronautics and Astronautics, (1984); Washington State Service to Humanity Award (1983); Distinguished Alumnus Award (1985) and Medallion of Merit (1987) Phi Sigma Kappa; Leonov Medal (Association of Space Explorers)(1992); Magnuson Puget Sound Legacy Award (People for Puget Sound)(2010). Distinguished Member, Association of Space Explorers (2010); Eleanor Stopps Environmental Leadership Award, Port Townsend Marine Science Center (2017).
