= STS-48 =

1991 American crewed spaceflight to deploy the Upper Atmospheric Research Satellite

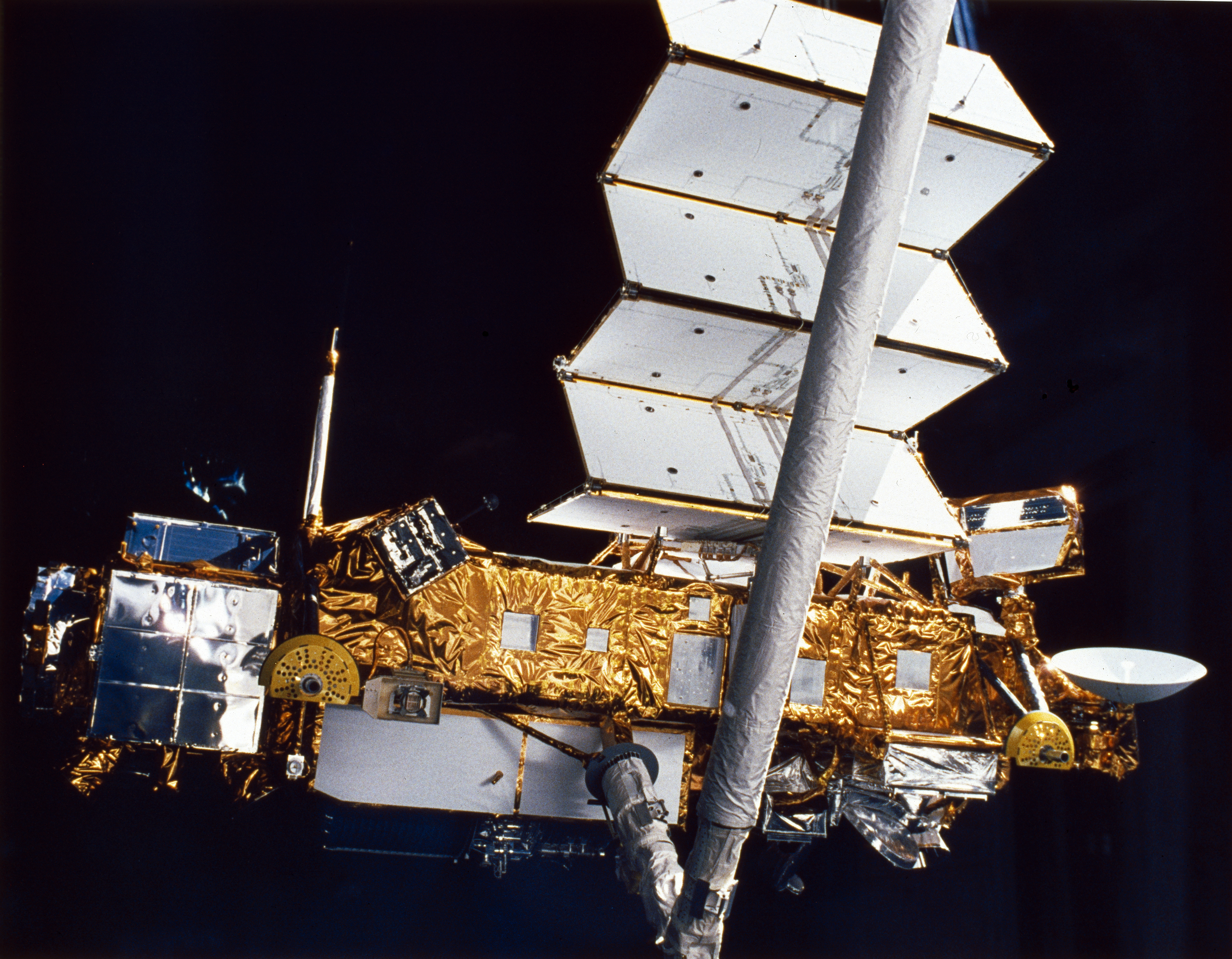
- The Upper Atmosphere Research Satellite (UARS) deployment
- Names: Space Transportation System-48
- Mission type: UARS satellite deployment
- Operator: NASA
- COSPAR ID: 1991-063A
- SATCAT no.: 21700
- Mission duration: 5 days, 8 hours, 27 minutes, 38 seconds
- Distance travelled: 3,530,369 km (2,193,670 mi)
- Orbits completed: 81

Spacecraft properties
- Spacecraft: Space Shuttle Discovery
- Launch mass: 108,890 kg (240,060 lb)
- Landing mass: 87,440 kg (192,770 lb)
- Payload mass: 7,865 kg (17,339 lb)

Crew
- Crew size: 5
- Members: John Oliver Creighton; Kenneth S. Reightler Jr.; Charles D. Gemar; James Buchli; Mark N. Brown

Start of mission
- Launch date: September 12, 1991, 23:11:04 UTC (7:11:04 pm EDT)
- Launch site: Kennedy, LC-39A
- Contractor: Rockwell International

End of mission
- Landing date: September 18, 1991, 07:38:42 UTC (12:38:42 am PDT)
- Landing site: Edwards, Runway 22

Orbital parameters
- Reference system: Geocentric orbit
- Regime: Low Earth orbit
- Perigee altitude: 575 km (357 mi)
- Apogee altitude: 580 km (360 mi)
- Inclination: 57.00°
- Period: 96.20 minutes

Instruments
- Air Force Maui Optical Site (AMOS); Ascent Particle Monitor (APM); Cosmic Ray Effects and Activation Monitor (CREAM); Investigations into Polymer Membrane Processing (IPMP); Middeck 0-Gravity Dynamics Experiment (MODE); Physiological and Anatomical Rodent Experiment (PARE); Protein Crystal Growth (PCG II-2); Shuttle Activation Monitor (SAM)
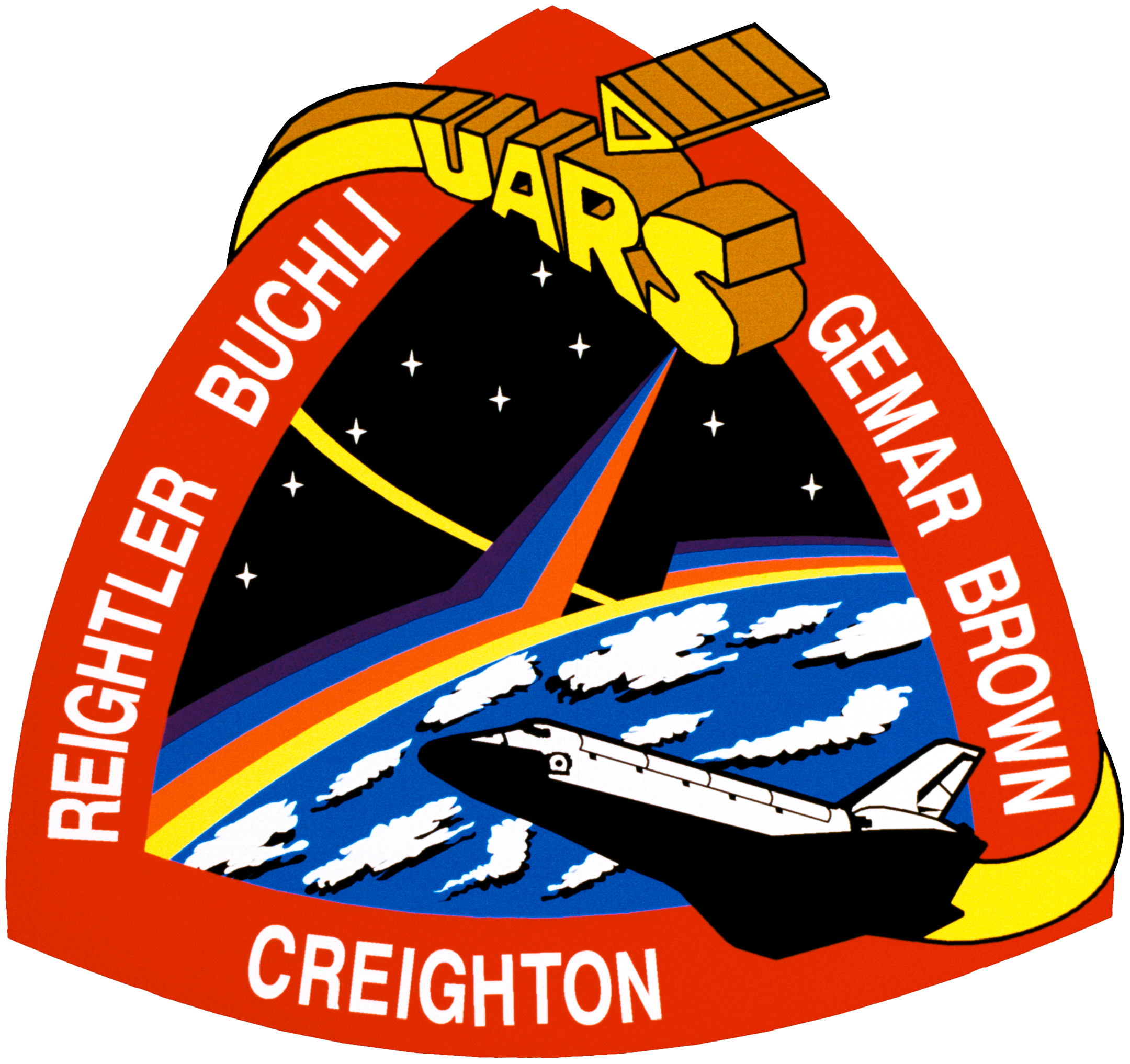
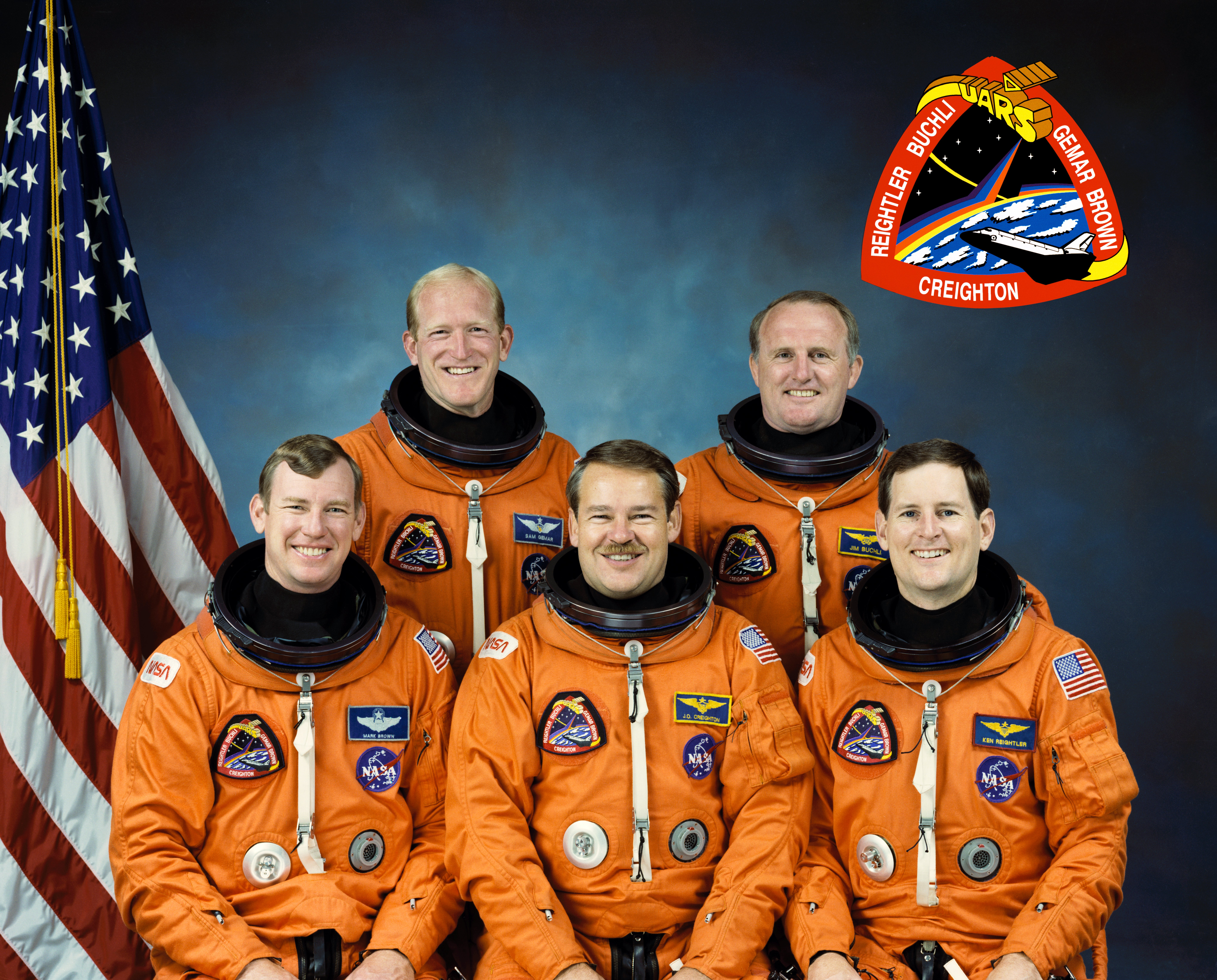
- STS-48 mission patch Back row; Charles D. Gemar, James Buchli; Front row: Mark N. Brown, John Oliver Creighton, Kenneth S. Reightler Jr. Space Shuttle program

STS-48 was a Space Shuttle mission that launched on September 12, 1991, from Kennedy Space Center, Florida. The orbiter was Space Shuttle Discovery on her 13th flight. The primary payload was the Upper Atmosphere Research Satellite (UARS). The mission landed on September 18 at 12:38 a.m. EDT at Edwards Air Force Base on runway 22. The mission was completed in 81 revolutions of the Earth and traveled 3,530,369 km (2,193,670 mi). The 5 astronauts carried out a number of experiments and deployed several satellites. The total launch mass was 108,890 kg (240,060 lb) and the landing mass was 87,440 kg (192,770 lb).

== Crew ==
Position	Astronaut
Commander	John Oliver Creighton; Third and last spaceflight
Pilot	Kenneth S. Reightler Jr. First spaceflight
Mission Specialist 1	Charles D. Gemar; Second spaceflight
Mission Specialist 2 Flight Engineer	James Buchli; Fourth and last spaceflight
Mission Specialist 3	Mark N. Brown; Second and last spaceflight

=== Crew seat assignments ===
Seat	Launch	Landing	Seats 1–4 are on the flight deck. Seats 5–7 are on the mid-deck.
1	Creighton		Seats 1–4 are on the flight deck. Seats 5–7 are on the mid-deck.
2	Reightler		Seats 1–4 are on the flight deck. Seats 5–7 are on the mid-deck.
3	Gemar	Brown	Seats 1–4 are on the flight deck. Seats 5–7 are on the mid-deck.
4	Buchli		Seats 1–4 are on the flight deck. Seats 5–7 are on the mid-deck.
5	Brown	Gemar	Seats 1–4 are on the flight deck. Seats 5–7 are on the mid-deck.
6	Unused		Seats 1–4 are on the flight deck. Seats 5–7 are on the mid-deck.
7	Unused		Seats 1–4 are on the flight deck. Seats 5–7 are on the mid-deck.

== Mission highlights ==
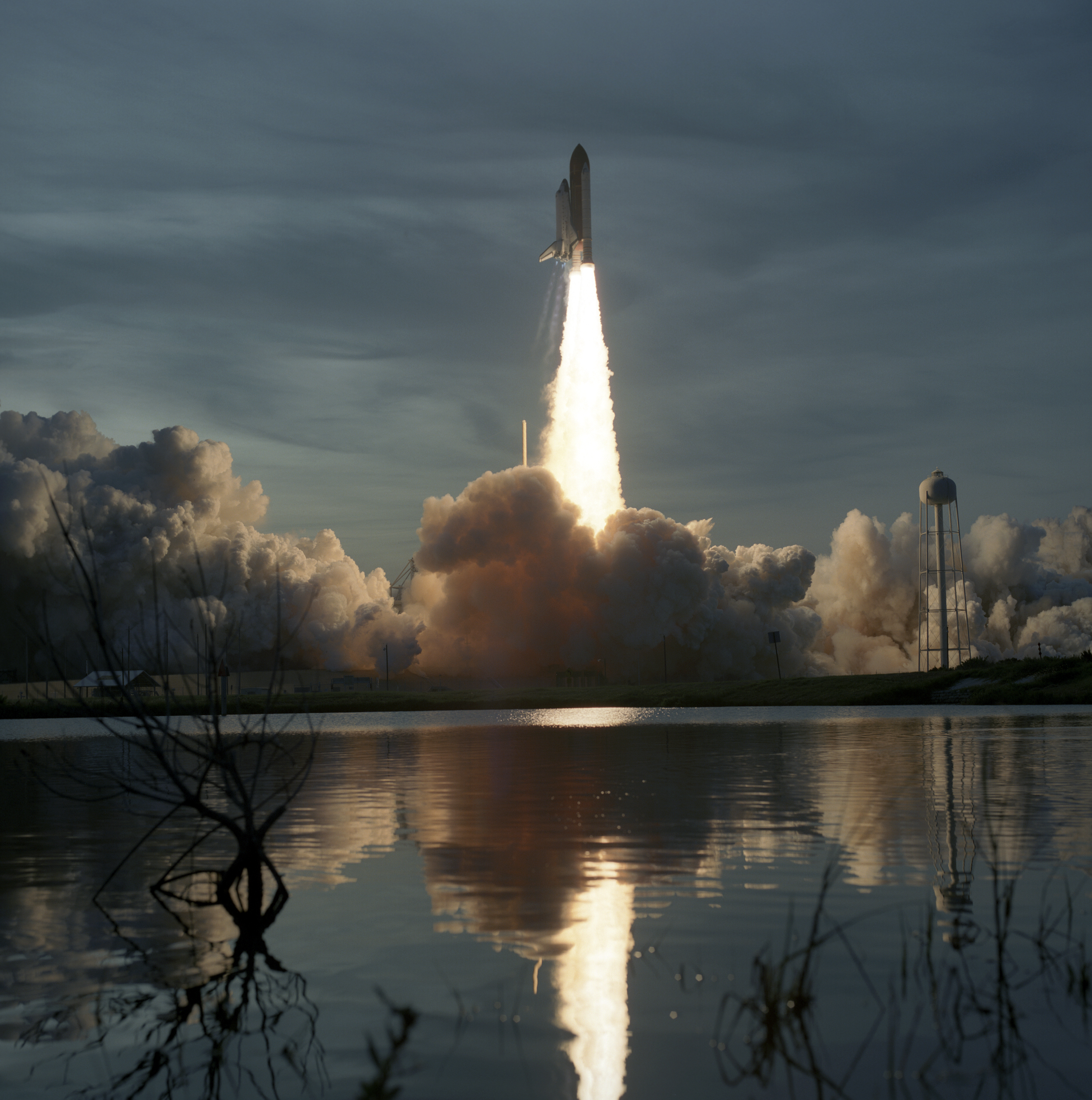
Liftoff of STS-48

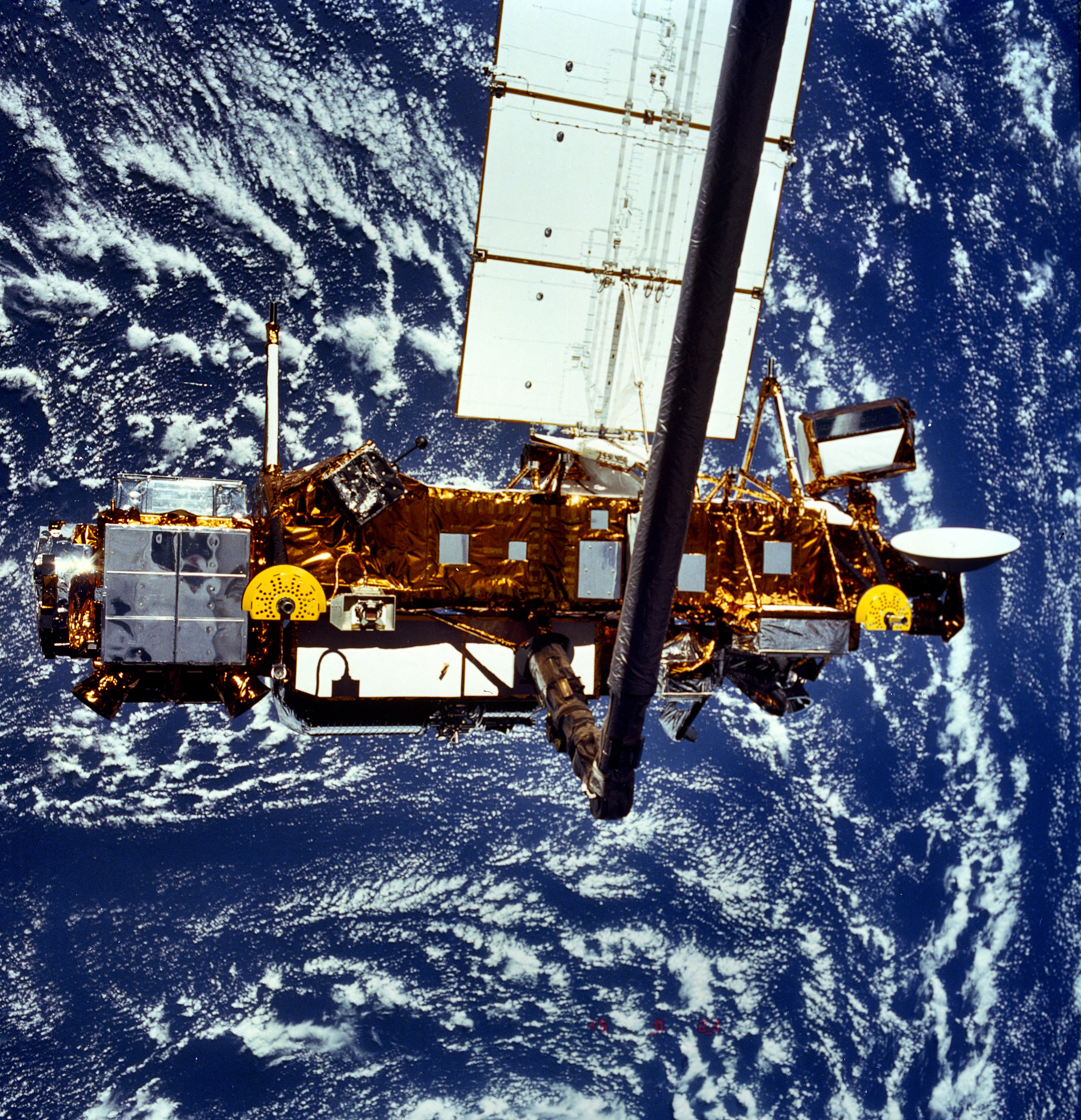
UARS on the remote manipulator (Canadarm) prior to deployment

Space Shuttle Discovery was launched into a 57.00° inclination orbit from the Kennedy Space Center (KSC) Launch Complex 39A at 7:11 p.m. EDT on September 12, 1991. Launch was delayed for 14 minutes at the T−5 minute mark due to a noise problem in the air-to-ground link. The noise cleared itself, and the countdown proceeded normally to launch.

On the third day of the mission, the Upper Atmosphere Research Satellite (UARS) was deployed from Discovery's payload bay 650 km (400 mi; 350 nmi) above Earth to study human effects on the planet's atmosphere and its shielding ozone layer. The UARS mission objectives were to provide an increased understanding of the energy input into the upper atmosphere, global photochemistry of the upper atmosphere, dynamics of the upper atmosphere, the coupling among these processes, and the coupling between the upper and lower atmosphere. This provided data for a coordinated study of the structure, chemistry, energy balance, and physical action of the Earth's middle atmosphere – that slice of air between 16 km (9.9 mi; 8.6 nmi) and 97 km (60 mi; 52 nmi) above the Earth. The UARS was the first major flight element of NASA's Mission to Planet Earth, a multi-year global research program that would use ground-based, airborne, and space-based instruments to study the Earth as a complete environmental system. UARS had ten sensing and measuring devices: Cryogenic Limb Array Etalon Spectrometer (CLAES); Improved Stratospheric and Mesospheric Sounder (ISAMS); Microwave Limb Sounder (MLS); Halogen Occultation Experiment (HALOE); High Resolution Doppler Imager (HRDI); Wind Imaging Interferometer (WlNDII); Solar Ultraviolet Spectral Irradiance Monitor (SUSIM); Solar/Stellar Irradiance Comparison Experiment (SOLSTICE); Particle Environment Monitor (PEM) and Active Cavity Radiometer Irradiance Monitor (ACRIM II). UARS's initial 18-month mission was extended several times – it was finally retired after 14 years of service.

Secondary payloads were: Ascent Particle Monitor (APM); Middeck 0-Gravity Dynamics Experiment (MODE); Shuttle Activation Monitor (SAM); Cosmic Ray Effects and Activation Monitor (CREAM); Physiological and Anatomical Rodent Experiment (PARE); Protein Crystal Growth (PCG II-2); Investigations into Polymer Membrane Processing (IPMP); and the Air Force Maui Optical Site (AMOS) experiment.

The flight was the first to test an electronic still camera in space, a modified Nikon NASA F4. Images obtained during the flight were monochrome with 8 bits of digital information per pixel (256 gray levels) and stored on a removable hard disk. The images could be viewed and enhanced on board using a modified lap-top computer before being transmitted to the ground via the orbiter digital downlinks.

STS-48 was the second post-Challenger mission to have Kennedy Space Center as the planned End-Of-Mission landing site, and the first mission to have a planned night landing at KSC. However, due to weather conditions at KSC in Florida, Discovery flew one extra orbit and landed at Edwards Air Force Base, California, at 3:38 a.m. EDT on September 18, 1991. The orbiter returned to KSC on September 26, 1991.

== Ice particles ==
Video while in orbit on September 15, 1991, shows a flash of light and several objects that appear to be flying in an artificial or controlled fashion. NASA explained the objects as ice particles reacting to engine jets. Philip C. Plait discussed the issue in his book Bad Astronomy, agreeing with NASA. This topic was also discussed in an episode of UFO Hunters.

== Wake-up calls ==
NASA began a tradition of playing music to astronauts during the Project Gemini, and first used music to wake up a flight crew during Apollo 15. Each track is specially chosen, often by the astronauts' families, and usually has a special meaning to an individual member of the crew, or is applicable to their daily activities.

Day	Song	Artist/Composer	Played For
Day 2	Hound Dog	Elvis Presley	
Day 3	Release Me	Elvis Presley	In anticipation of the release of the UARS
Day 4	The Bare Necessities	The Sherman Brothers	Ken Reightler, chosen by his daughters (who were in the control room, from the animated 1967 Disney film The Jungle Book, sung by Phil Harris as Baloo and Bruce Reitherman as Mowgli)
Day 5	Are You Lonesome Tonight?	Elvis Presley	Chosen for its line "Are you sorry we drifted apart?" referring to Discovery's separation from its payload (UARS)
Day 6	Return to Sender	Elvis Presley	In anticipation of their landing that day

== See also ==
- List of human spaceflights
- List of Space Shuttle missions
- Nikon NASA F4
- Outline of space science
