= John Oliver Creighton =

American astronaut (born 1943)

John Creighton
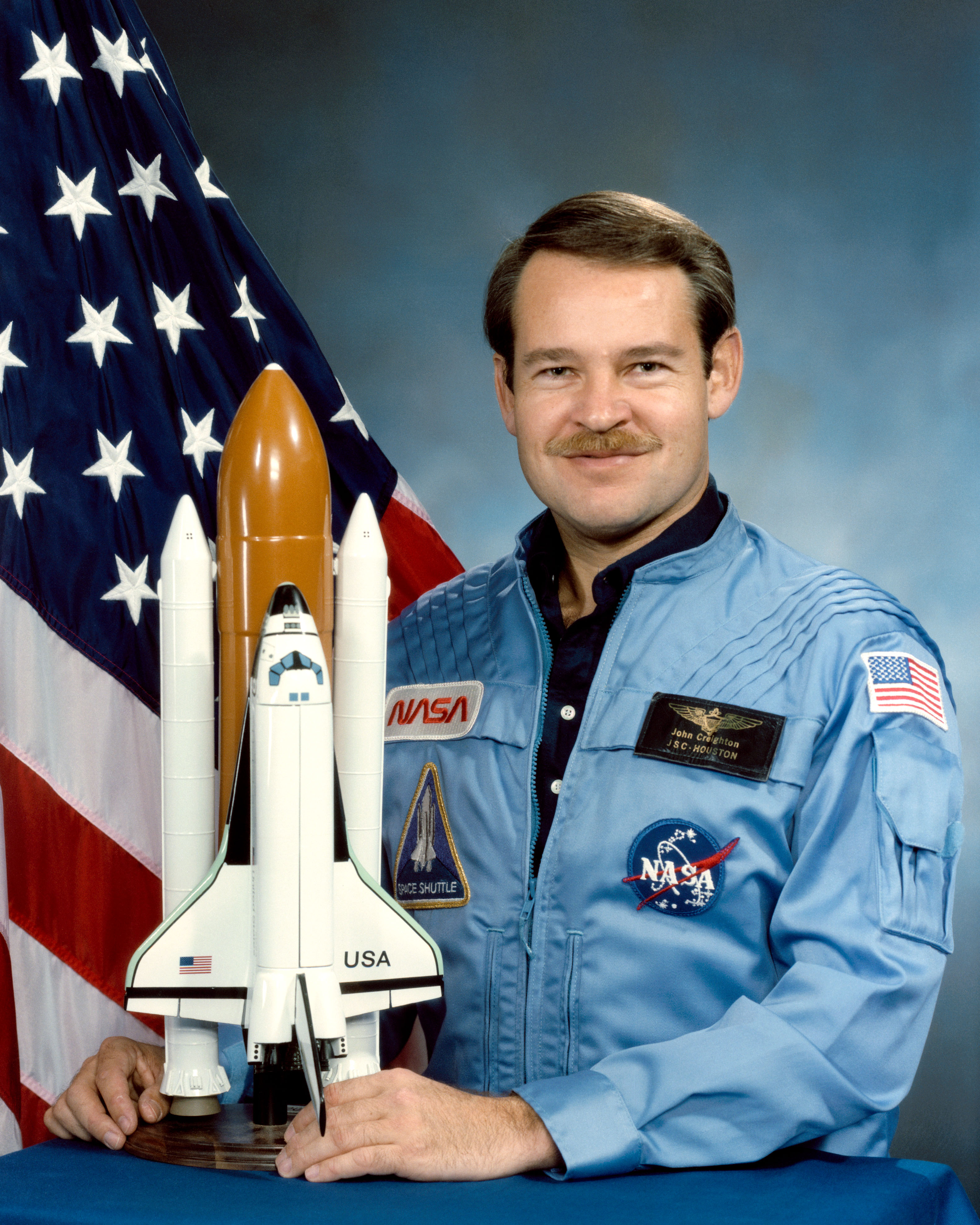
- Born: John Oliver Creighton; April 28, 1943 (age 83); Orange, Texas, U.S.
- Education: United States Naval Academy (BS); George Washington University (MS)
- Space career

NASA astronaut
- Rank: Captain, USN
- Time in space: 16d 20h 24m
- Selection: NASA Group 8 (1978)
- Missions: STS-51-G; STS-36; STS-48

John Oliver Creighton (born April 28, 1943), (Capt, USN, Ret.), is a former NASA astronaut who flew three Space Shuttle missions.

== Personal life ==
Creighton was born on April 28, 1943, in Orange, Texas, but considers Seattle, Washington, to be his hometown. He is married to the former Terry Stanford of Little Rock, Arkansas.

== Education ==
He graduated from Ballard High School, Seattle, Washington, in 1961; received a Bachelor of Science degree from the United States Naval Academy in 1966 and a Master of Science degree in Administration of Science and Technology from George Washington University in 1978.

== Military career ==
Creighton started flight training following graduation from the United States Naval Academy and received his aviator wings in October 1967. He was with squadron VF-154 from July 1968 to May 1970, flying F-4J Phantoms and made two combat deployments to Vietnam aboard the aircraft carrier USS Ranger. From June 1970 to February 1971, he attended the U.S. Naval Test Pilot School at Naval Air Station Patuxent River, Maryland, and upon graduation was assigned as a project test pilot with the Service Test Division at NAS Patuxent River. During this two-year tour of duty, he served as the F-14 Tomcat engine development project officer. In July 1973, Creighton commenced a four-year assignment with VF-2 and became a member of the first F-14 operational squadron, completing two deployments aboard USS Enterprise to the Western Pacific. He returned to the United States in July 1977 and was assigned to the Naval Air Test Center's Strike Directorate as operations officer and F-14 program manager.

He has logged over 6,000 hours flying time, the majority of it in jet fighters, and has completed 500 carrier landings and 175 combat missions.

== NASA career ==
Selected as an astronaut candidate by NASA in January 1978, Creighton became an astronaut in August 1979. During the following four years, he held a variety of technical assignments in support of the Space Shuttle Program. Following his first flight, Creighton became the astronaut representative to the Shuttle Program Manager. During the ensuing two years, Creighton participated in all the key decisions following the Challenger disaster helping to shape the plan for resuming safe crewed space flight. Starting with STS-26, Creighton served as Lead "CAPCOM" for the first four Space Shuttle flights. In March 1989 he was assigned to command STS-36 but continued to serve as Head of the Mission Support Branch in the Astronaut Office until commencing full-time training for his upcoming flight. Following his second flight, Creighton headed up the Operations Development Branch within the Astronaut Office for one year prior to resuming full-time training for his next command. Creighton served as pilot on STS-51-G (June 17–24, 1985), was spacecraft commander on STS-36 (February 28 to March 4, 1990) and STS-48 (September 12–18, 1991), and has logged over 403 hours in space. Captain Creighton left NASA and retired from the Navy in July 1992. He was formerly a test pilot and worked in Aircraft Marketing & Delivery with the Boeing Airplane Company until he retired in 2007.

=== Space flights ===
STS-51-G Discovery (June 17–24, 1985) was a 7-day mission during which the crew deployed communications satellites for Mexico (Morelos), the Arab League (Arabsat), and the United States (AT&T Telstar). They used the Remote Manipulator System (RMS) to deploy and later retrieve the SPARTAN satellite which performed 17 hours of X-ray astronomy experiments while separated from the Space Shuttle. In addition, the crew activated the Automated Directional Solidification Furnace (ADSF), six Getaway Specials, participated in biomedical experiments, and conducted a laser tracking experiment as part of the Strategic Defense Initiative. Mission duration was 112 Earth orbits in 169 hours and 39 minutes.

STS-36 Atlantis (February 28 to March 4, 1990) carried Department of Defense payloads and a number of secondary payloads. Mission duration was 72 Earth orbits in 106 hours, 19 minutes, 43 seconds.

STS-48 Discovery (September 12–18, 1991) was a 5-day mission during which the crew deployed the Upper Atmosphere Research Satellite (UARS) which is designed to provide scientists with their first complete data set on the upper atmosphere's chemistry, winds and energy inputs. The crew also conducted numerous secondary experiments ranging from growing protein crystals, to studying how fluids and structures react in weightlessness. Mission duration was 81 Earth orbits in 128 hours, 27 minutes, 34 seconds.

== Political career ==
He unsuccessfully ran as a Republican candidate for the Washington State Senate in 1997.

== Organizations ==
He is a member of the Society of Experimental Test Pilots and the Association of Space Explorers.

== Honors ==
He was awarded the Defense Superior Service Medal, Legion of Merit, Distinguished Flying Cross, ten Air Medals, the Armed Forces Expeditionary Medal, the Vietnam Cross of Gallantry, the NASA Distinguished Service Medal, NASA Leadership Medal, three NASA Space Flight Medals, the French Legion of Honor and the Saudi Arabia King Fahd Medal.
