= Daniel Brandenstein =

American astronaut and test pilot (born 1943)

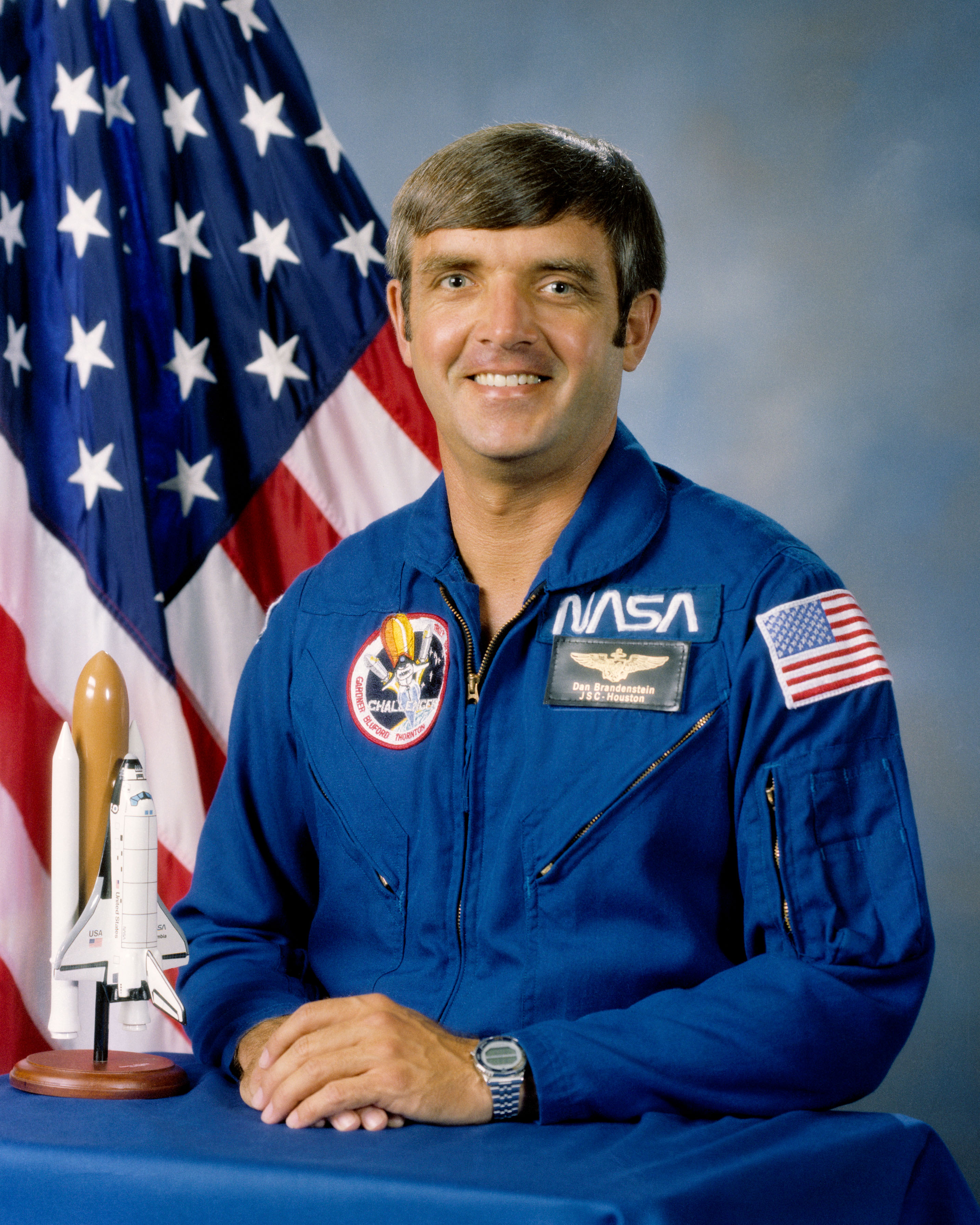
- Brandenstein in 1984
- Born: Daniel Charles Brandenstein; January 17, 1943 (age 83); Watertown, Wisconsin, U.S.
- Education: University of Wisconsin–River Falls (BS)
- Space career

NASA astronaut
- Rank: Captain, USN
- Time in space: 32d 21h 3m
- Selection: NASA Group 8 (1978)
- Missions: STS-8; STS-51-G; STS-32; STS-49
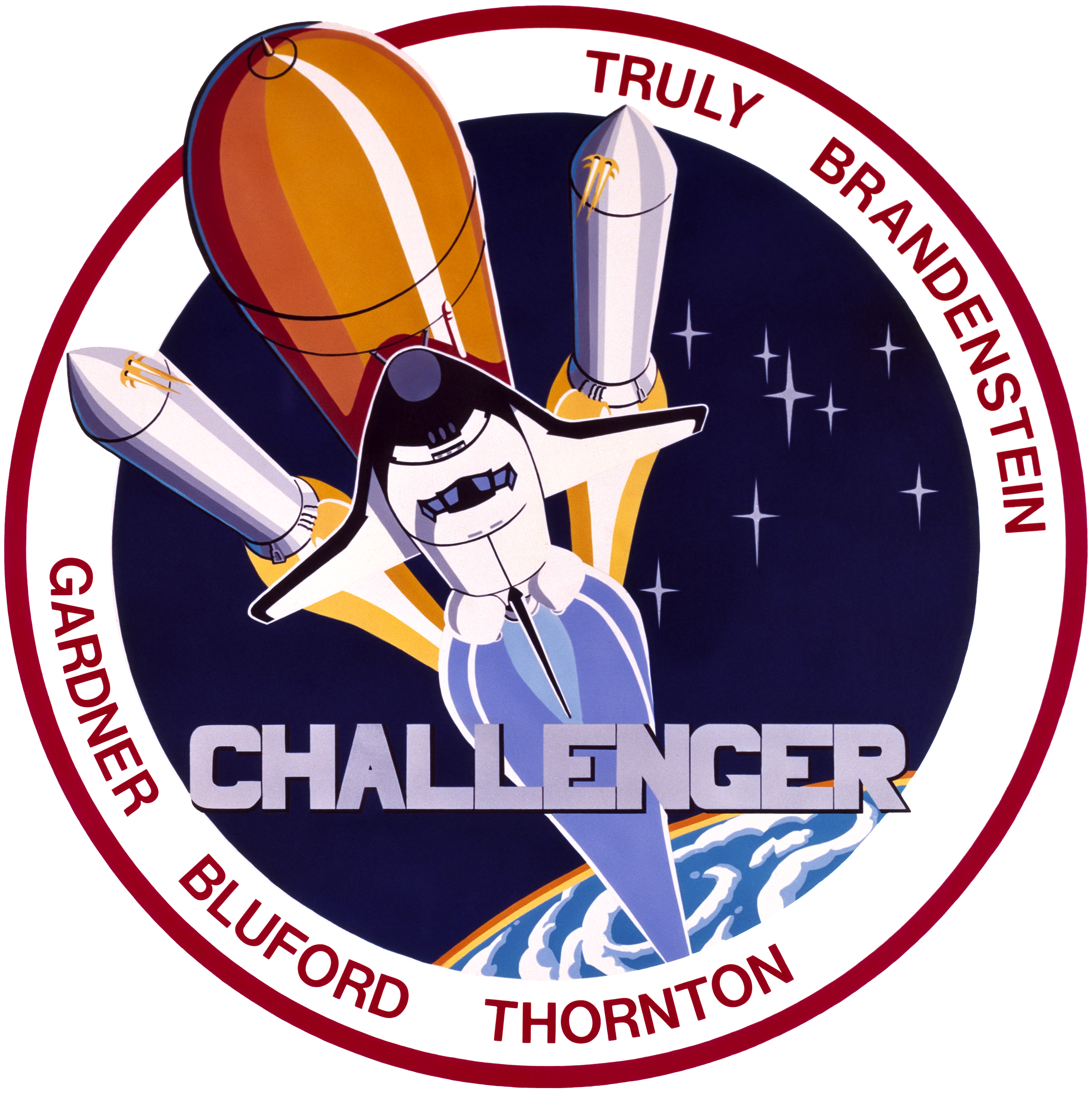
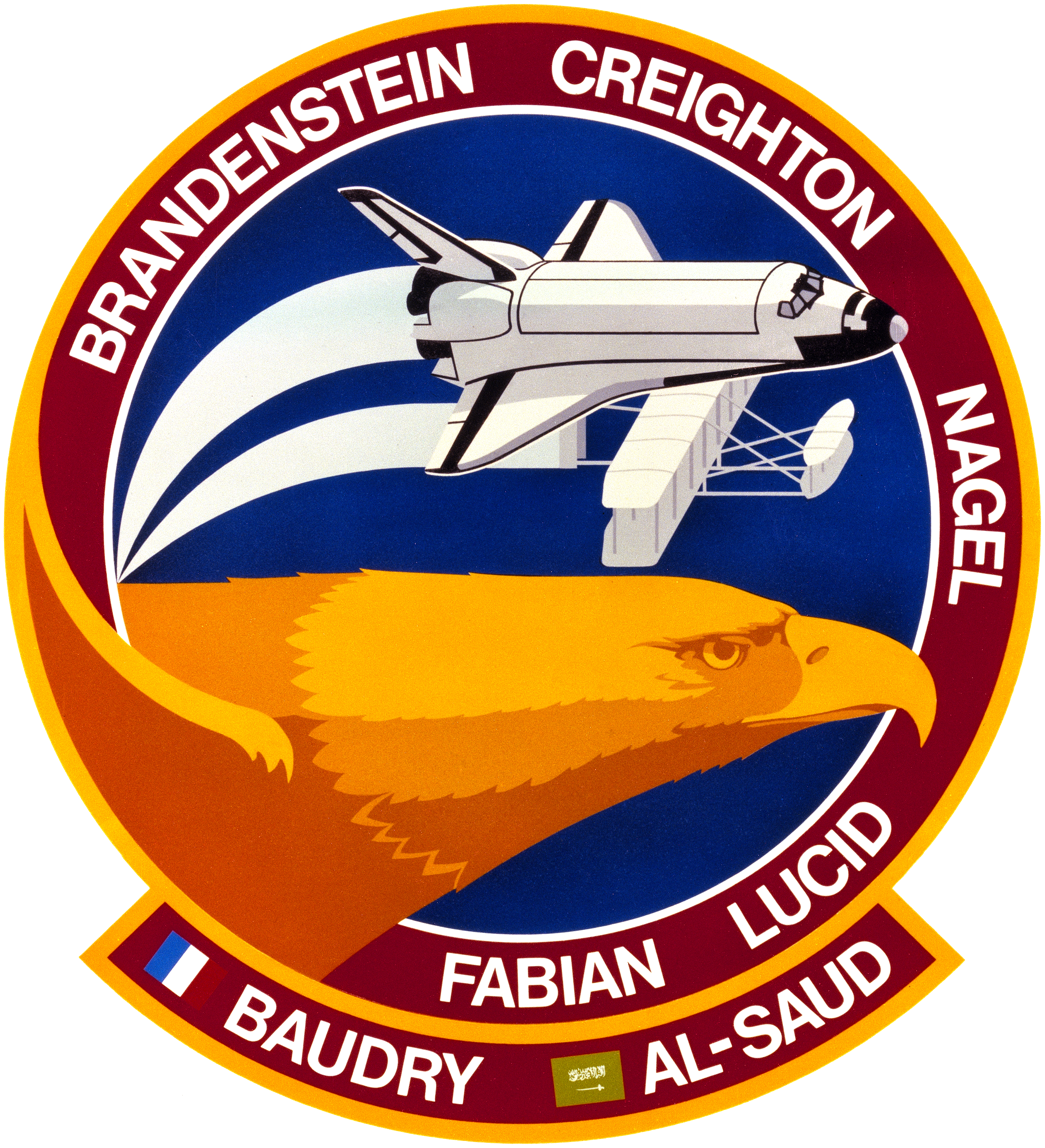
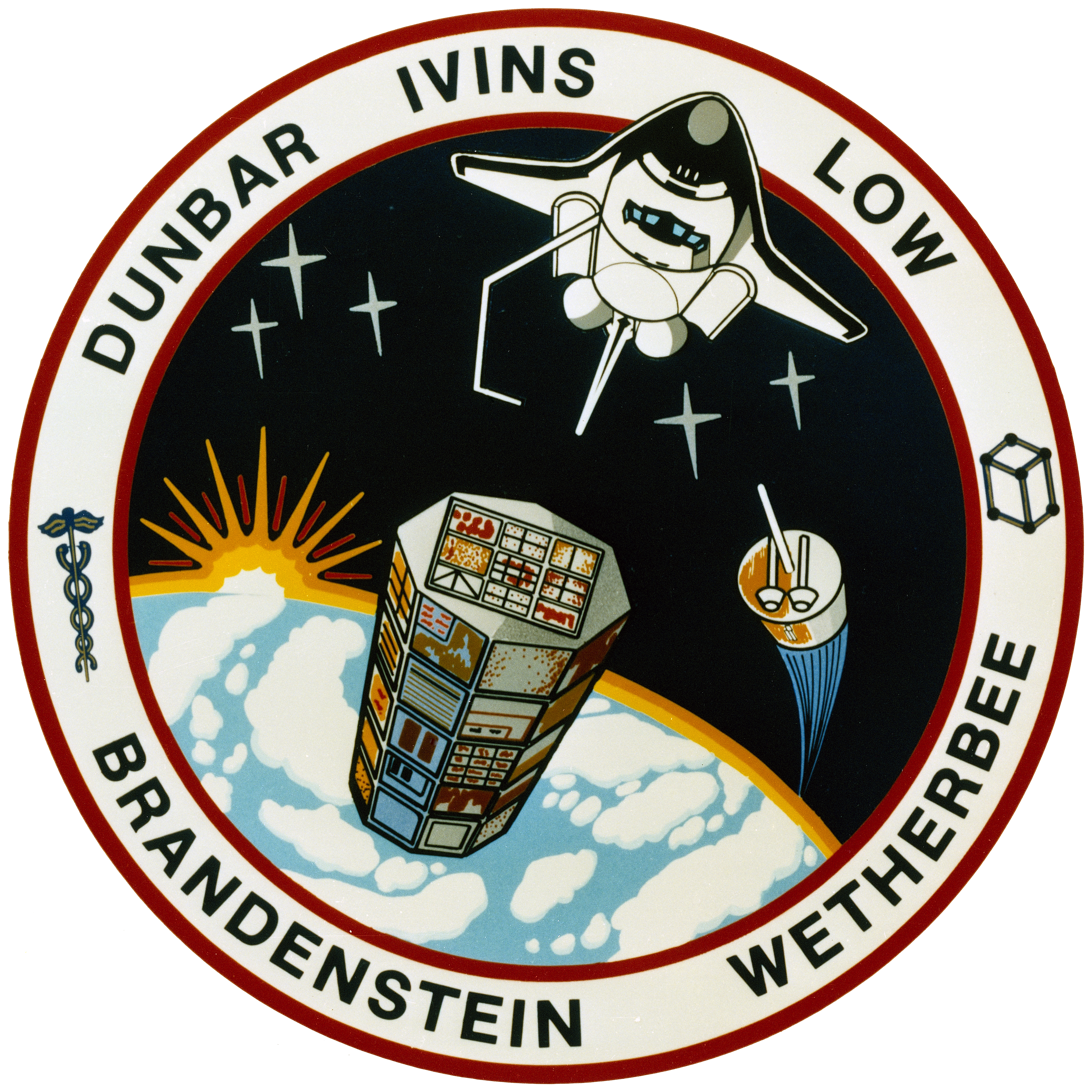
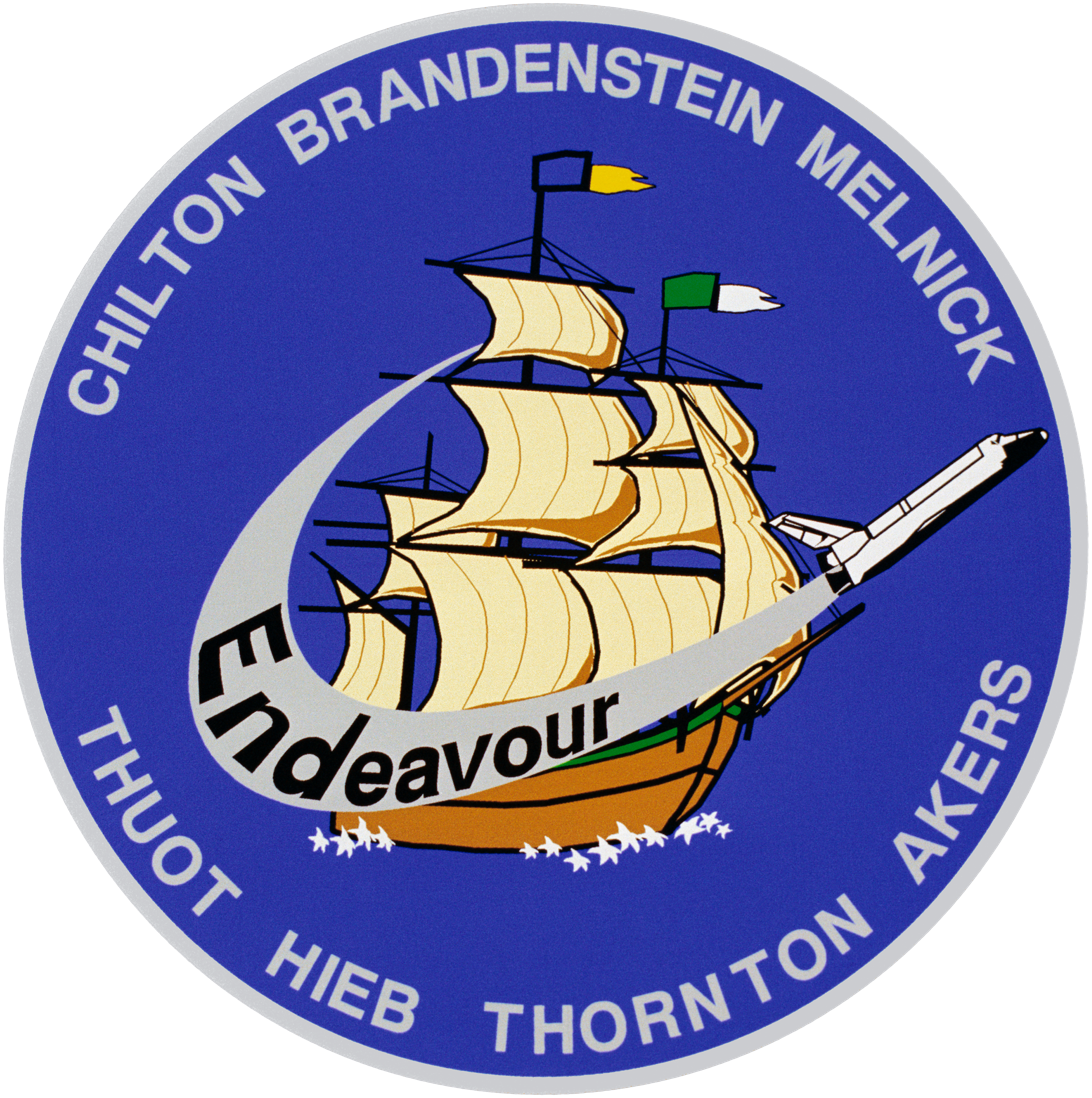
- Mission insignia
- Retired: October 1992

Daniel Charles Brandenstein (born January 17, 1943) is the Executive Vice President and Chief Operating Officer of United Space Alliance. He is a former Naval Aviator, test pilot and NASA astronaut, who flew four Space Shuttle missions. He also served as Chief of the Astronaut Office from 1987 to 1992.

== Military career ==
After graduating with a Bachelor of Science degree in mathematics and physics from the University of Wisconsin–River Falls, and having been a member of Phi Sigma Kappa, Brandenstein entered active duty with the U.S. Navy in September 1965 and was attached to the Naval Air Training Command for flight training. He was designated a Naval Aviator at Naval Air Station Beeville, Texas, in May 1967 and then proceeded to attack squadron VA-128 for A-6 Intruder fleet replacement training. From 1968 to 1970, while attached to VA-196 flying A-6s, he participated in two combat deployments on board the aircraft carriers USS Constellation and USS Ranger to Southeast Asia where he flew 192 combat missions in the Vietnam War. In subsequent assignments, he was attached to VX-5 for the conduct of operational tests of A-6 weapons systems and tactics; and to the Naval Air Test Center, where, upon graduation from the U.S. Naval Test Pilot School at NAS Patuxent River, Maryland, he conducted tests of electronic warfare systems in various Navy aircraft. Brandenstein carried out a nine-month deployment to the Western Pacific and Indian Ocean on board USS Ranger while attached to VA-145, flying A-6 Intruders during the period March 1975 to September 1977. Before reporting to the Johnson Space Center in Houston as an astronaut candidate, he was attached to VA-128 as an A-6 flight instructor.

== NASA career ==
=== Selection and training ===
Selected by NASA in January 1978, Brandenstein became an astronaut in August 1979. He was ascent spacecraft communicator (CAPCOM) and a member of the astronaut support crew for STS-1 (the first flight of the Space Shuttle). He was subsequently assigned to the STS-2 astronaut support crew and was the ascent CAPCOM for the first two Space Shuttle flights. A veteran of four space flights—STS-8 (August 30 – September 3, 1983), STS-51-G (June 17–24, 1985), STS-32 (January 9–20, 1990), and STS-49 (May 7–16, 1992) -- Brandenstein has logged over 789 hours in space. Following his second space flight, he served as the Deputy Director of Flight Crew Operations. Between April 1987 and September 1992 Brandenstein served as Chief of the Astronaut Office.

=== STS-8 ===
Brandenstein was a pilot on STS-8, his first flight, which was launched from the Kennedy Space Center, Florida, on August 30, 1983. This was the third flight for the Orbiter Challenger and the first mission with a night launch and night landing. During the mission, crew members deployed the Indian National Satellite (INSAT-1B); operated the Canadian-built Remote Manipulator System (RMS) with the Payload Flight Test Article (PFTA); operated the Continuous Flow Electrophoresis System (CFES) with live cell samples; conducted medical measurements to understand biophysiological effects on space flight and activated various Earth resources and space science experiments along with four "Getaway Special" canisters. STS-8 completed 98 orbits of the Earth in 145 hours before landing at Edwards Air Force Base, California, on September 3, 1983.

=== STS-51-G ===
On his second mission (June 17–24, 1985), Brandenstein commanded the crew of STS-51-G aboard the Orbiter Discovery. During this seven-day mission, crew members deployed communications satellites for Mexico (Morelos), the Arab League (Arabsat) and the United States (AT&T Telstar). They used the Remote Manipulator System (RMS) to deploy and later retrieve the SPARTAN satellite, which performed 17 hours of X-ray astronomy experiments while separated from the Space Shuttle. In addition, the crew activated the Automated Directional Solidification Furnace (ADSF) and six "Getaway Specials", they also participated in biomedical experiments and conducted a laser tracking experiment as part of the Strategic Defense Initiative. The mission was accomplished in 112 Earth orbits over approximately 170 hours.

=== STS-32 ===
Brandenstein then commanded the crew of STS-32 (January 9–20, 1990). In the longest Shuttle mission to date, crew members aboard the Orbiter Columbia successfully deployed the Syncom IV-F5 satellite, and retrieved the 9,724 kg (21,393 lb) Long Duration Exposure Facility (LDEF) using the RMS. They also conducted a variety of mid-deck experiments, including the Microgravity Disturbance Experiment (MDE) using the Fluids Experiment Apparatus (FEA), Protein Crystal Growth (PCG), American Flight Echocardiograph (AFE), Latitude/Longitude Locator (L3), Mesoscale Lightning Experiment (MLE), Characterization of Neurospora Circadian Rhythms (CNCR) and the IMAX camera. Additionally, numerous medical test objectives, including in-flight Lower Body Negative Pressure (LBNP), in-flight aerobic exercise and muscle performance were conducted to evaluate human adaptation to extended duration missions. Following 173 orbits of the Earth in 261 hours, the mission ended with a night landing in California.

=== STS-49 ===
Brandenstein also commanded the crew of STS-49 (May 7 – 16, 1992), on the maiden flight of the new Space Shuttle Endeavour. During this mission, the crew conducted the initial test flight of Endeavour, performed a record four EVAs (space walks) to retrieve, repair and re-deploy the International Telecommunications Satellite (Intelsat) and to demonstrate and evaluate numerous EVA tasks to be used for the assembly of the Space Station 'Freedom'. Additionally, a variety of medical, scientific and operational tests were conducted throughout the mission. STS-49 logged 213 hours in space and 141 Earth orbits before landing at Edwards AFB, where the crew conducted the first test of the Endeavour's drag chute.

=== Retirement ===
He retired from NASA and the United States Navy in October 1992.

== Special honors and awards ==
He was awarded the Defense Superior Service Medal with oak leaf cluster, the Legion of Merit, the Distinguished Flying Cross, the Defense Meritorious Service Medal, 17 Air Medals, the Navy Commendation Medal with oak leaf cluster and Valor device, a Meritorious Unit Commendation, two NASA Distinguished Service Medals, two NASA Outstanding Leadership Medals, four NASA Space Flight Medals, the National Defense Service Medal, the Armed Forces Expeditionary Medal, the Vietnam Service Medal, a Sea Service Deployment Ribbon, the French Legion of Honor, the Medal of King Abdul Aziz (Saudi Arabia), the Vietnam Air Gallantry Cross, the Vietnam Gallantry Cross Unit Citation and the Republic of Vietnam Campaign Medal. He is a Distinguished Alumnus at the University of Wisconsin, River Falls; an Honorary Doctor of Engineering at the Milwaukee School of Engineering; an Honorary Doctor of Science from the University of Wisconsin-River Falls. Brandenstein is a recipient of the SETP Iven C. Kincheloe Award, the AIAA Haley Space Flight Award, the Federation Aeronautique Internationale (FAI) Yuri Gagarin Gold Medal and the American Astronautical Society Flight Achievement Award. He was inducted into the Wisconsin Aviation Hall of Fame in 1992.

Preceded by John W. Young	Chief of the Astronaut Office; 1987–1992	Succeeded by Robert L. Gibson
