= James Buchli =

American astronaut (born 1945)

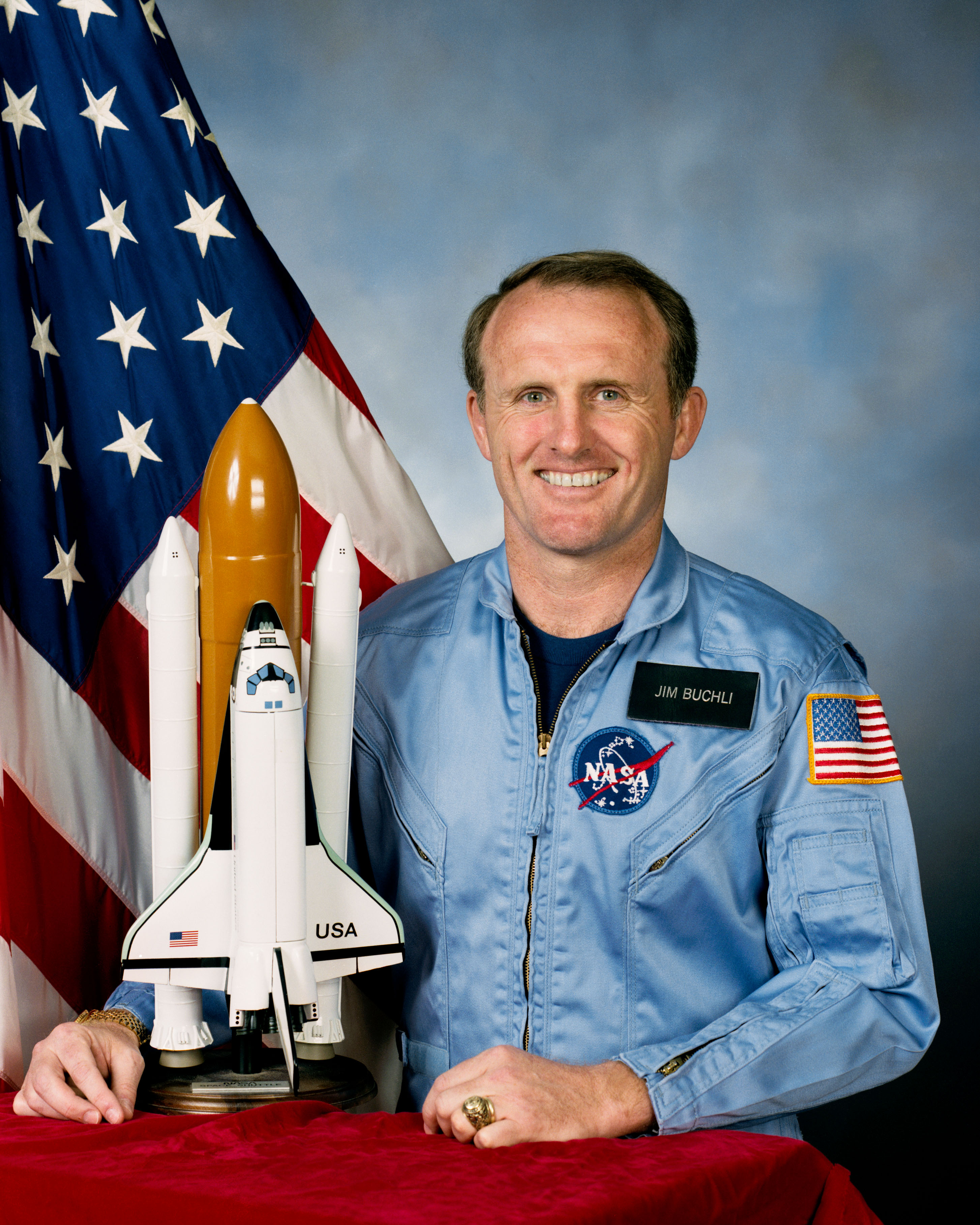
- Buchli in 1987
- Born: James Frederick Buchli; June 20, 1945 (age 81); New Rockford, North Dakota, U.S.
- Education: United States Naval Academy (BS); University of West Florida (MS)
- Space career

NASA astronaut
- Rank: Colonel, USMC
- Time in space: 20d 10h 25m
- Selection: NASA Group 8 (1978)
- Mission: STS-51-C; STS-61-A; STS-29; STS-48
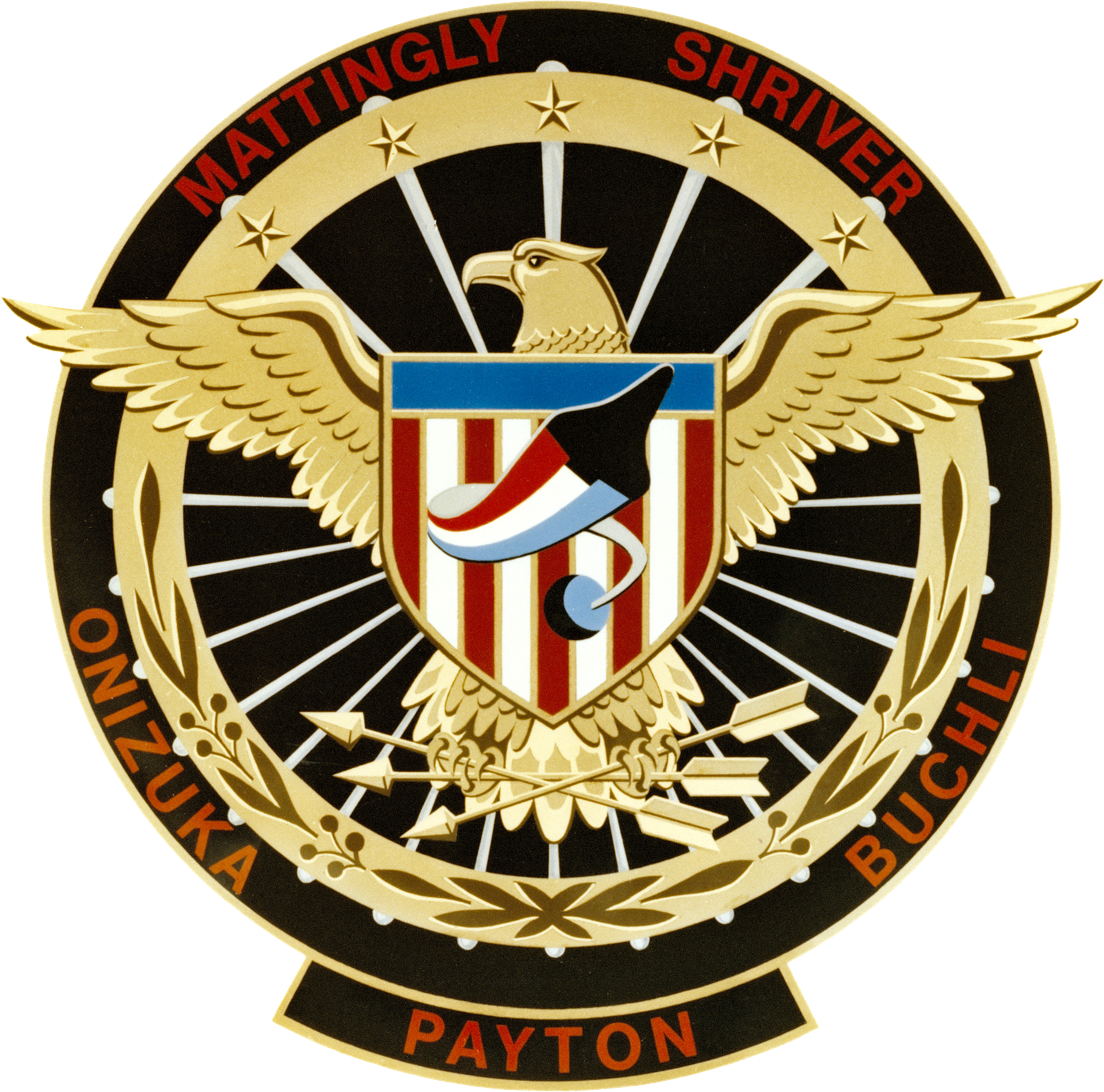
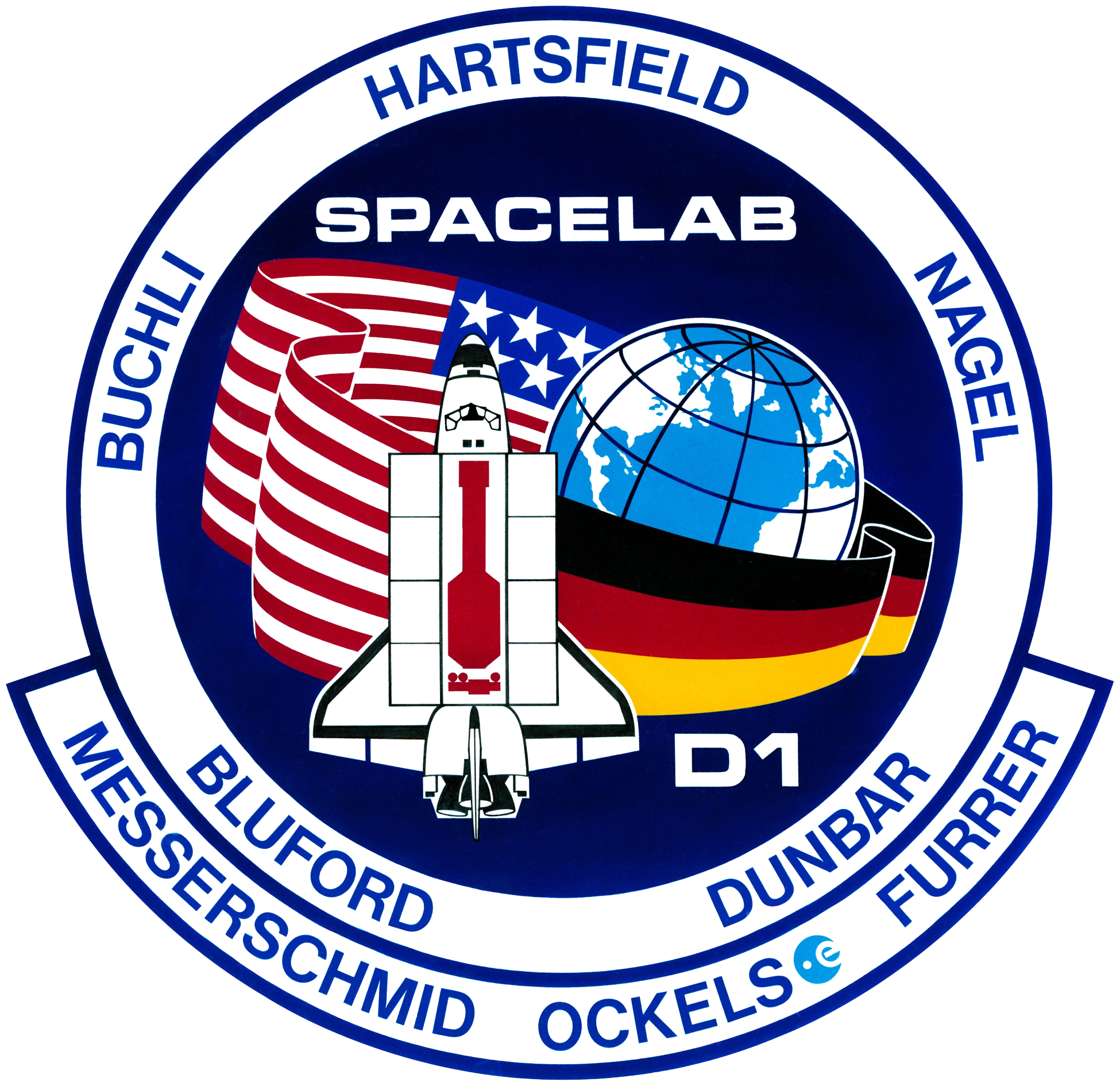
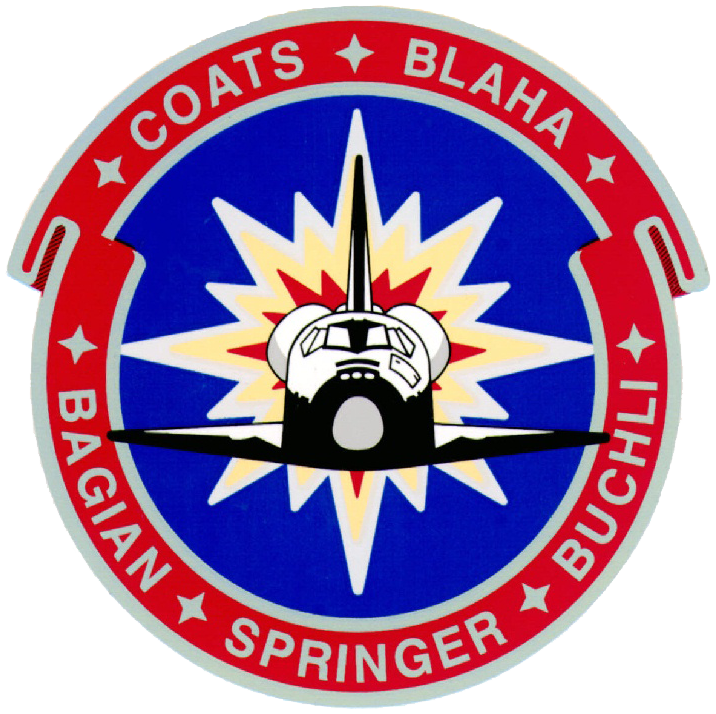
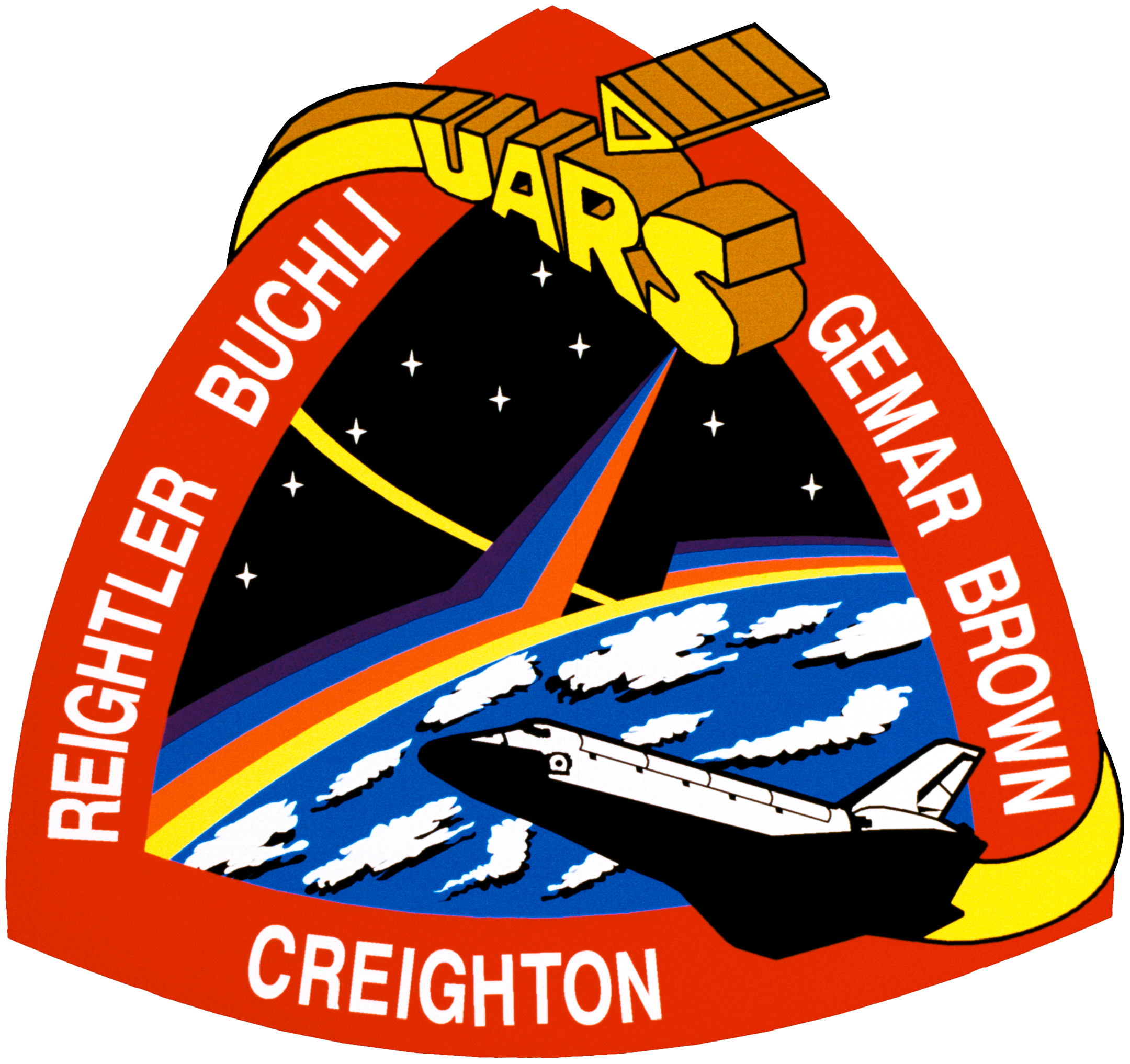
- Mission insignia

James Frederick Buchli (born June 20, 1945) is a retired United States Marine aviator and former NASA astronaut who flew on four Space Shuttle missions.

== Early life and education ==
Buchli graduated from Fargo Central High School, Fargo, North Dakota, in 1963 and received a Bachelor of Science degree in Aeronautical Engineering from the United States Naval Academy in 1967. He also earned a Master of Science degree in Aeronautical Engineering Systems from the University of West Florida in 1975.

Buchli is an associate member of Naval Academy Alumni, American Legion, Association of Space Explorers, and American Geophysical Union.

== Military career ==
Buchli received his commission in the United States Marine Corps following graduation from the United States Naval Academy at Annapolis, Maryland in 1967. He graduated from Basic Infantry Officer's Course and was subsequently sent to the Republic of Vietnam for a 1-year tour of duty, where he served as a Platoon Commander with the 9th Marine Regiment, and then as Executive Officer and Company Commander for B Company, 3rd Reconnaissance Battalion. He returned to the United States in 1969 for naval flight officer training at Naval Air Station Pensacola, Florida. After earning his wings, he spent the next 2 years assigned to VMFA-122 at Marine Corps Air Station Kaneohe Bay, Hawaii, and Marine Corps Air Station Iwakuni, Japan. In 1973, he proceeded to duty with VMFA-115 at Royal Thai Air Base Nam Phong in Thailand, and again MCAS Iwakuni. Upon completing this tour of duty, he again returned to the United States and participated in the Marine Advanced Degree Program at the University of West Florida. He was assigned subsequently to VMFA-312 at Marine Corps Air Station Beaufort, South Carolina, and in 1977, to the U.S. Naval Test Pilot School at Naval Air Station Patuxent River, Maryland.

He has logged over 4,200 hours flying time: 4,000 hours in jet aircraft, including combat in the F-4 Phantom II.

== NASA career ==
Buchli became a NASA astronaut in August 1979, selected as part of Group 8. He was a member of the support crew for STS-1 and STS-2, and On-Orbit CAPCOM for STS-2. A veteran of four space flights, Buchli has orbited the Earth 319 times, traveling 7.74 million miles in 20 days, 10 hours, 25 minutes, 32 seconds. He served as a mission specialist on STS-51-C, STS-61-A, STS-29, and STS-48. From March 1989 till May 1992 he also served as Deputy Chief of the Astronaut Office.

On September 1, 1992, Buchli retired from the Marine Corps and the NASA Astronaut Office to accept a position as manager of space station systems operations and requirements with Boeing Defense and Space Group, at Huntsville, Alabama. In April 1993, he was reassigned as Boeing deputy for payload operations, Space Station Freedom Program. Buchli currently serves as operations and utilization manager for space station, Boeing Defense and Space Group, at Houston, Texas.

=== Space flights ===
- STS-51-C flew the Space Shuttle Discovery, and was the first dedicated Department of Defense mission. Launched January 24, 1985, from Kennedy Space Center, STS-51-C performed its mission to deploy a modified Inertial Upper Stage (IUS) vehicle from the Space Shuttle. Landing occurred on January 27, 1985, after slightly more than three days on orbit, ending a mission lasting 73 hours, 33 minutes, and 27 seconds.
- STS-61-A, launched October 30, 1985, and landing November 6, saw the Space Shuttle Challenger perform a West German D-1 Spacelab mission. It was the first to carry eight crew members, then the largest crew to fly in space, and the first in which payload activities were controlled from outside the United States. More than 75 scientific experiments were completed in the areas of physiological sciences, materials processing, biology, and navigation, and the mission duration was 168 hours, 44 minutes, and 51 seconds.
- STS-29, flew the Discovery from March 13, 1989, to March 18, a five-day mission during which the crew deployed a Tracking and Data Relay Satellite, and performed numerous secondary experiments, including a space station "heat pipe" radiator experiment, two student experiments, a protein crystal growth experiment, and a chromosome and plant cell division experiment. In addition, the crew took over 3,000 photographs of the Earth using several types of cameras, including the IMAX 70 mm movie camera, during the 119 hours, 39 minutes, 40 second mission.
- STS-48, from September 12, to September 18, 1991, was a five-day mission during which the crew of the Discovery deployed the Upper Atmosphere Research Satellite (UARS) designed to provide scientists with their first complete data set on the upper atmosphere's chemistry, winds, and energy inputs. The crew also conducted numerous secondary experiments ranging from growing protein crystals, to studying how fluids and structures react in weightlessness. Mission duration was 128 hours, 27 minutes; 34 seconds.

== Awards and decorations ==
Buchli is a recipient of the Defense Superior Service Medal, Legion of Merit, Purple Heart, Defense Meritorious Service Medal, Navy and Marine Corps Commendation Medal and Vietnam Gallantry Cross with silver star. He is a 2019 inductee into the United States Astronaut Hall of Fame. Buchli was the 49th recipient of the Theodore Roosevelt Rough Rider Award on July 30, 2024.
