= Abdulmohsen Al-Bassam =

Saudi Arabian aviator

Abdulmohsen Hamad Al-Bassam
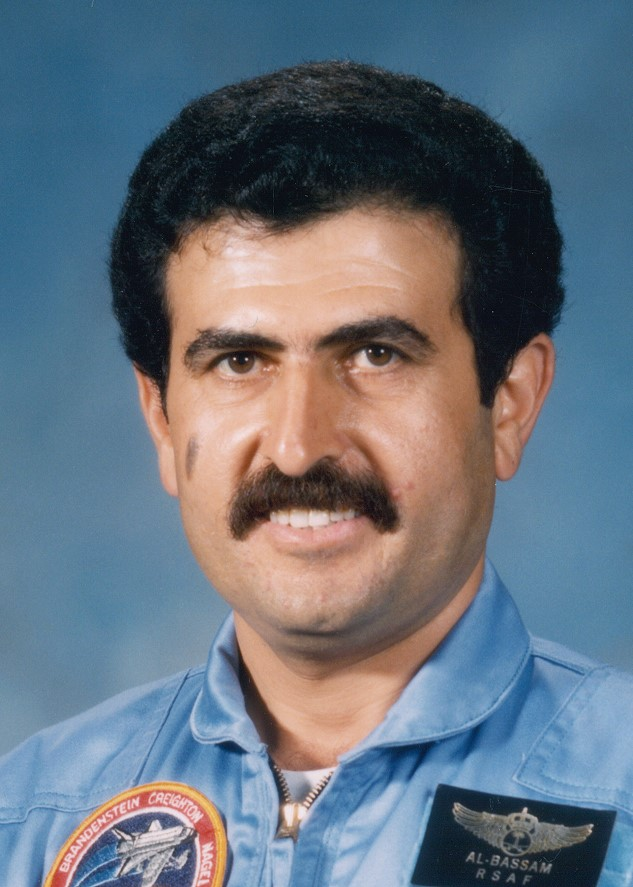
- Born: December 12, 1948 (age 77); Unayzah, Saudi Arabia
- Occupations: Fighter pilot, Royal Saudi Air Force
- Space career

Astronaut
- Rank: General, Royal Saudi Air Force
- Selection: April, 1985

Abdulmohsen Hamad Al-Bassam (Arabic: عبد المحسن البسام) is a retired Royal Saudi Air Force officer and a former astronaut. He was the back-up payload specialist for Sultan bin Salman bin Abdulaziz Al Saud on STS-51-G.

He was born on December 12, 1948, in Unayzah, Saudi Arabia.

He graduated from King Faisal Air Academy in Riyadh (Bachelor of Science in Air Science) and was a fighter pilot with the Royal Saudi Air Force. Selected in April 1985, he served as the back-up payload specialist for STS-51-G Discovery (June 17–24, 1985) on which Arabsat-1B was deployed. With the conclusion of this flight, he retired from active duty as a payload specialist. He later served as the Air Force Attache at the Embassy of Saudi Arabia in London, United Kingdom.

He is married and has two sons and three daughters.
