= Guillaume Baudry =

Canadian gunsmith, goldsmith, and silversmith

Guillaume Baudry (2 October 1657 – 1732) was a gunsmith and gold and silversmith in New France.

Baudry, who was also written as Beaudry, also went by Des Butes, or Desbutes. He married an armourer’s daughter at Quebec and they settled at Trois-Rivières. They had fifteen children and ensured the future of their family in the area. One son, Jean-Baptiste, became a gunsmith and was one of the first inhabitants of Detroit.
