= Gabriel Taschereau de Baudry =

Gabriel Taschereau, seigneur de Baudry (March 15, 1673 – April 22, 1755) was a French administrator.

== Life and career ==
Born in Tours, he was the son of Jean Taschereau de Baudry, who had served as mayor of Tours between 1678 and 1682, and his wife Nicole Françoise Collin. Following in the footsteps of his father, Gabriel Taschereau de Baudry served as mayor of Tours around 1710.

On July 1, 1720, he was appointed Lieutenant General of Police of Paris, i.e. head of the Paris Police. While in office, he issued the decree of 1720 for the security of the inhabitants of Paris. He also instituted the Certificate of Conduct for servants.

He left the Lieutenancy General of Police of Paris on April 26, 1722, and was appointed Intendant of Finances, with entry in the Royal Council of Finances. In 1740 he was made conseiller d'État.

Gabriel Taschereau de Baudry was married to Philippe Taboureau des Réaux. He died in Paris in 1755 at the age of 82.
