= Armand Léon de Baudry d'Asson =

French politician (1836–1915)

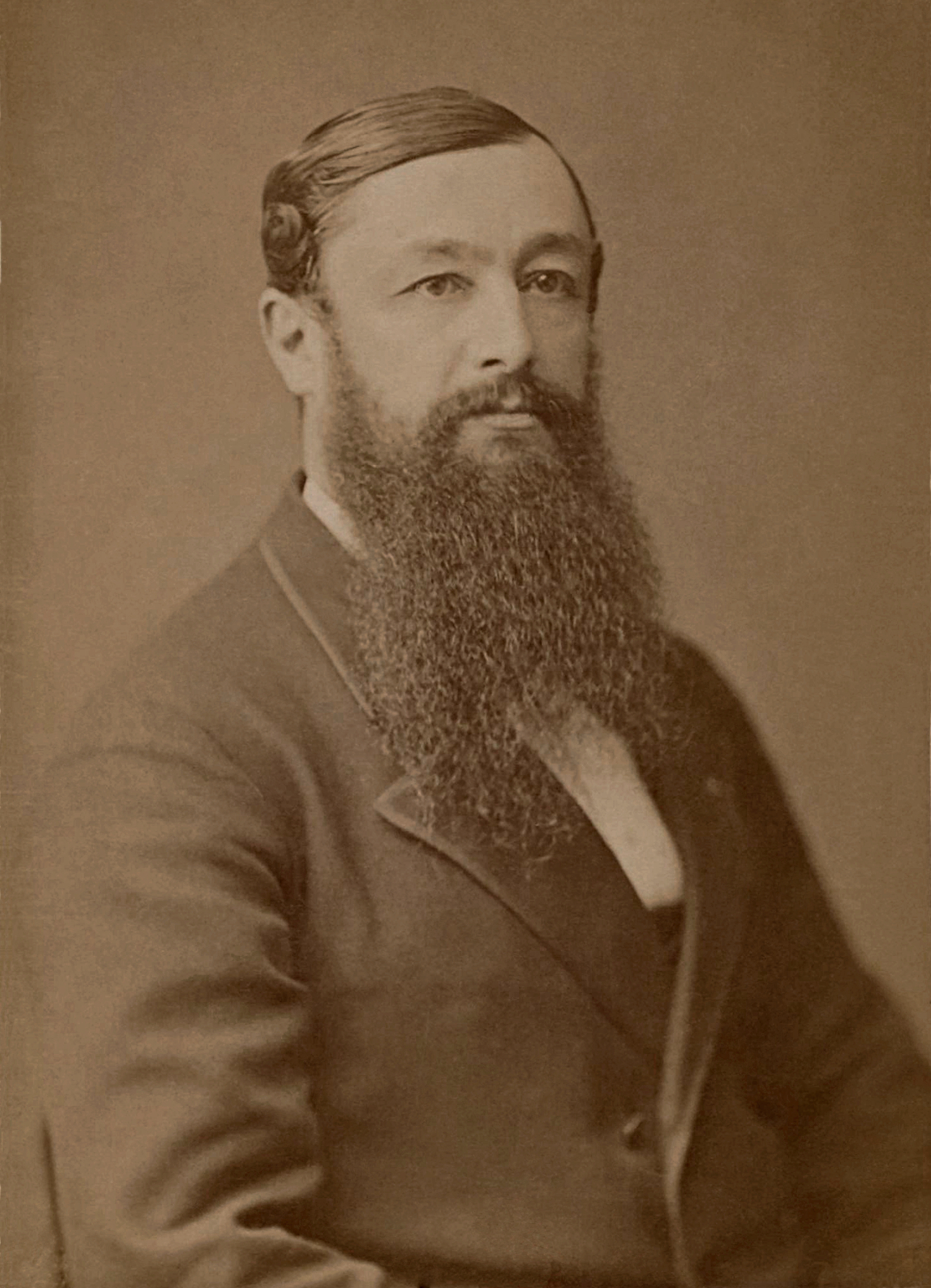
- Born: 15 June 1836; Rocheservière, France
- Died: 12 May 1915
- Occupation: Politician

Armand Léon de Baudry d'Asson (15 June 1836 – 12 May 1915) was a French Legitimist politician. He was a member of the Chamber of Deputies from 1876 to 1914.
