= Jean-Baptiste Baudry =

Jean-Baptiste Baudry (bapt 3 July 1684 – 20 November 1755) was born at Trois-Rivières and was the son of Guillaume Baudry, a gunsmith and goldsmith.

Jean-Baptiste pursued his father's craft and, as in his fathers case, was known by various names. He traveled to various forts and settlements practicing his craft. In 1735, he acquired land at Fort Detroit and settled there for the remainder of his life. He was one of the first inhabitants of the area. His descendants are known by the name Des Buttes.
