= Patrick Baudry =

French fighter pilot and astronaut (born 1946)

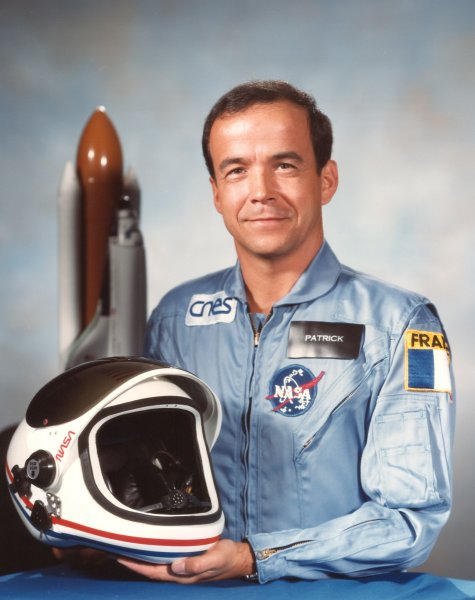
- Born: March 6, 1946 (age 80); Douala, Cameroon
- Occupation: Fighter pilot
- Space career

CNES astronaut
- Status: Retired
- Rank: Colonel, French Air Force
- Time in space: 7d 01h 38m
- Selection: 1980 CNES Group 1
- Missions: STS-51-G

Patrick Pierre Roger Baudry (born March 6, 1946, in Cameroon) is a retired colonel in the French Air Force and a former CNES astronaut. In 1985, he became the second French citizen in space, after Jean-Loup Chrétien, when he flew aboard NASA's Space Shuttle mission STS-51-G.

== Personal ==
Baudry was born in Douala (French Cameroon) and is married with three children from another union. His hobbies include mechanical sports, such as motorcycling and car racing. He also enjoys running marathons, playing squash, skiing, shooting, windsurfing, and sky diving. Baudry is also a wine connaisseur. His parents were part of the French resistance during the Second World War and his family was rewarded the Resistance Medal for their courage and effort during the war.

== Education ==
- Prytanée National Militaire, 1967
- French Airforce Academy "École de l'Air", 1969

== Experience ==
Baudry completed flight training at Salon-de-Provence and Tours, France, receiving his wings in 1970. Served as a fighter pilot in Fighter Squadron 1/11 "Roussillon" on F100 and Jaguar, and completed numerous operational missions in several countries of Africa. He entered the Empire Test Pilots' School at Boscombe Down, England, in 1978, and was awarded the Patuxent Trophy at the completion of the course. He was assigned to the Flight Test Center in Brétigny-sur-Orge, France, in 1979, where he flew various test projects on fighter and attack-type aircraft which included flying the different types of Mirages, Jaguar, and Crusader.

He has logged more than 4,000 hours flying time – 3,300 in jet aircraft – and has flown over 100 different types of aircraft – F-100, F-104, F-4, A-8, T-33, Lightning, Harrier, Hunter, Canberra, Jaguar, all types of Mirages, Mystère 4, Vautour, and other aircraft.

Baudry holds an airline transport pilot license. He worked for some time after his space flight for Airbus as a test pilot, and is now retired in the Aquitaine region.

== CNES experience ==
Baudry became a CNES astronaut candidate in June 1980. For two years, he trained at CNES and at Star City near Moscow. He was a member of the back-up crew for the French-Soviet Soyuz T-6 Intercosmos mission and was trained for scientific experiments in the fields of physiology, biology, materials processing in space, and astronomy. Baudry is a CNES expert for crewed space flight activities and participates in the analysis of decisions and study of definition for the future "Hermes" space aircraft.

== Spaceflight experience ==
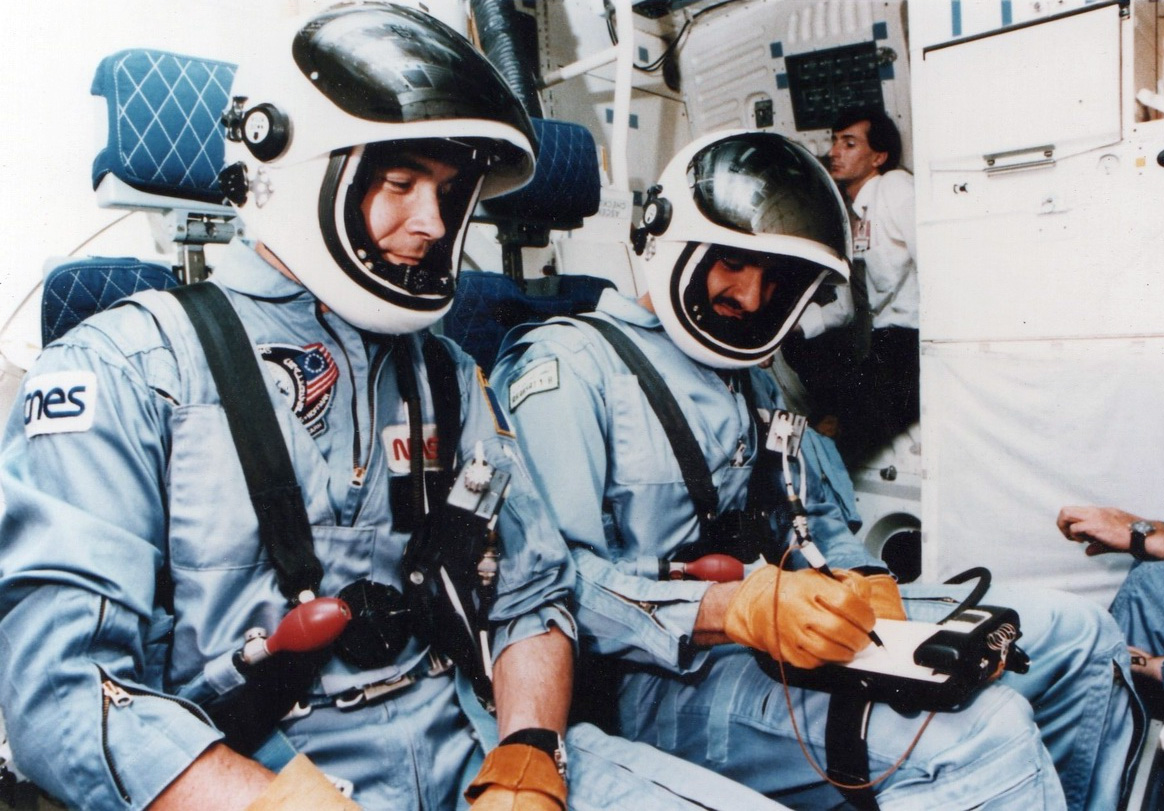
Patrick Baudry and Prince Sultan in 1985

Baudry flew as a payload specialist on STS-51-G Discovery (June 17–24, 1985). STS-51-G was launched from Kennedy Space Center, Florida, and returned to land at Edwards Air Force Base, California. The international crew aboard Discovery deployed communications satellites for Mexico (Morelos), the Arab League (Arabsat), and the United States (AT&T Telstar). They deployed and later retrieved the SPARTAN satellite, which performed 17 hours of x-ray astronomy experiments while separated from the Space Shuttle. In completing this flight, Baudry traveled 2.5 million miles (roughly 4,000,000 km) in 112 Earth orbits, logging over 169 hours in space.

== Organizations ==
Association of European Astronauts; correspondent of the Air and Space Academy; and member of several wine tasters' confréries, such as "Chevaliers du Tastevin," "Jurade de St Emilion", and "Confrérie du Bontemps".

== Awards and honors ==
Chevalier of the Legion of Honour; Chevalier of the National Merit Order; French Astronautics Medal; the Soviet Order of Friendship of Peoples and the Soviet Order of Gagarine.
