= Christian Baudry =

French footballer (born 1955)

Personal information
- Full name: Christian Baudry
- Date of birth: December 16, 1955 (age 70)
- Place of birth: Saumur, France
- Height: 1.75 m (5 ft 9 in)
- Position: Defender

Senior career*
Years	Team	Apps	(Gls)
1976–1980	Angers	55	(0)
1980–1983	Saint-Dié	96	(6)
1983–1986	Chamois Niortais	66	(8)
- * Club domestic league appearances and goals

Christian Baudry (born December 16, 1955) is a former professional footballer.
