= Terry Hart =

American astronaut (born 1946)

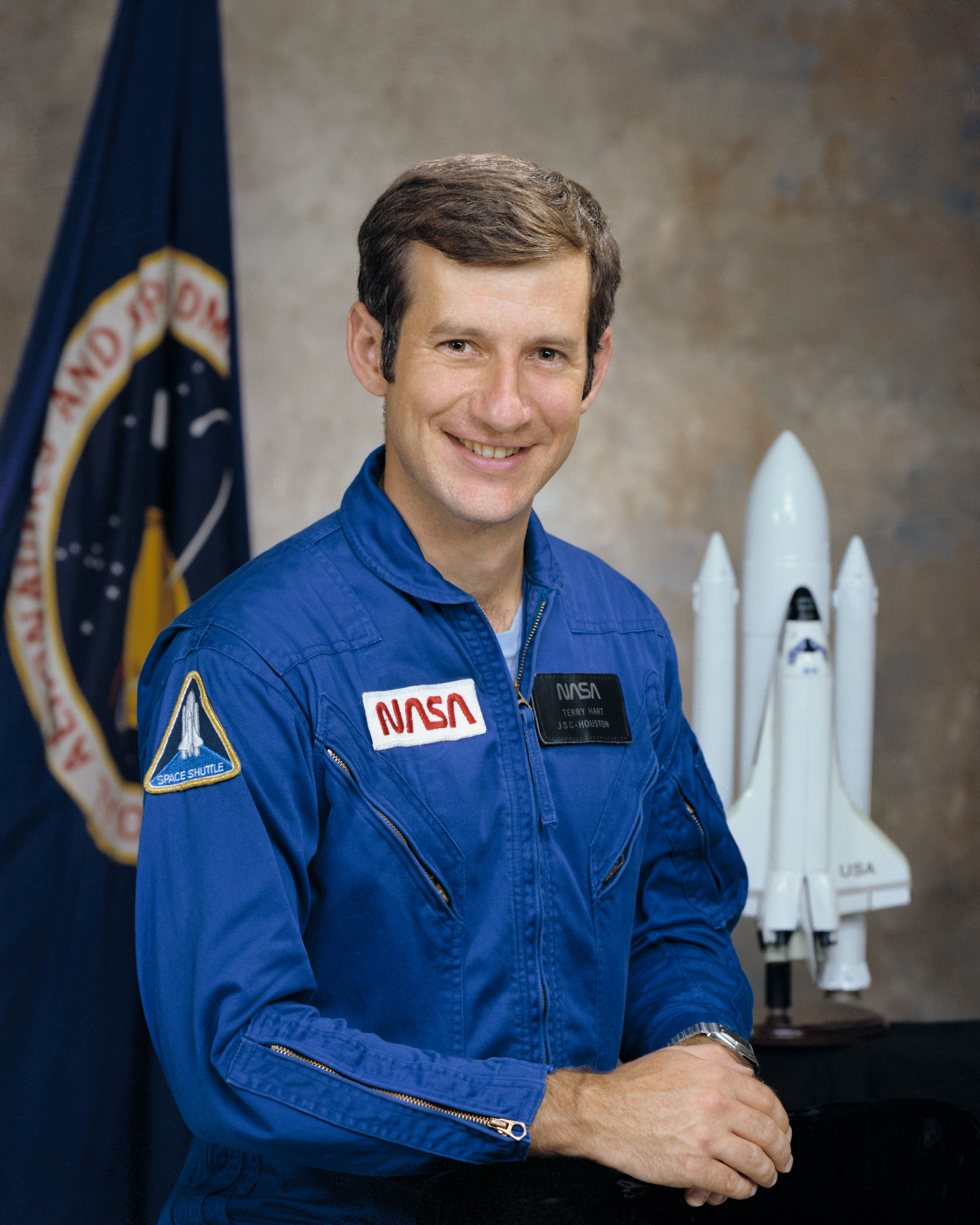
- Hart in 1978
- Born: Terry Jonathan Hart; October 27, 1946 (age 79); Pittsburgh, Pennsylvania, U.S.
- Education: Lehigh University (BS); Massachusetts Institute of Technology (MS); Rutgers University, New Brunswick (MS)
- Space career

NASA astronaut
- Rank: Lieutenant Colonel, USAF
- Time in space: 6d 23h 40m
- Selection: NASA Group 8 (1978)
- Missions: STS-41-C
- Retired: June 15, 1984

Terry Jonathan Hart (born October 27, 1946) is an American mechanical and electrical engineer, a retired United States Air Force lieutenant colonel and pilot, and former NASA astronaut. Hart served as a mission specialist on the STS-41-C mission, where tasks included operation of the shuttle Remote Manipulator System (RMS) arm to deploy the Long Duration Exposure Facility (LDEF) and Solar Max satellite.

== Early life and education ==
Hart was born on October 27, 1946, in Pittsburgh, Pennsylvania. He graduated from Mt. Lebanon High School in Mt. Lebanon, Pennsylvania, in 1964. He received a Bachelor of Science degree in mechanical engineering from Lehigh University in 1968, a Master of Science degree in mechanical engineering from the Massachusetts Institute of Technology in 1969, and a Master of Science degree in electrical engineering from Rutgers University in 1978.

He was awarded an honorary doctorate of engineering from Lehigh University in 1988.

== Career ==
=== Military service ===
Hart entered on active duty with the United States Air Force Reserve in June 1969. He completed Undergraduate Pilot Training at Moody Air Force Base, Georgia, in December 1970, and from then until 1973, flew F-106 interceptors for the Air Defense Command at Tyndall Air Force Base, Florida, at Loring Air Force Base, Maine, and at Dover Air Force Base, Delaware. In 1973, he joined the New Jersey Air National Guard and continued flying with the Guard until 1985, retiring as lieutenant colonel in 1990.

He has logged 3,000 hours flying time, with 2,400 hours in jets.

=== NASA ===
Hart was selected as an astronaut candidate by NASA in January 1978. In August 1979, he completed a one-year training and evaluation period, making him eligible for flight assignment on future Space Shuttle crews. Hart was also member of the support crews for STS-1, STS-2, STS-3, and STS-7. He was Ascent and Orbit CAPCOM with the Mission Control Team for those flights. He flew as a mission specialist on STS-41-C (April 6–13, 1984) and has logged a total of 168 hours in space.

==== STS-41-C Challenger ====
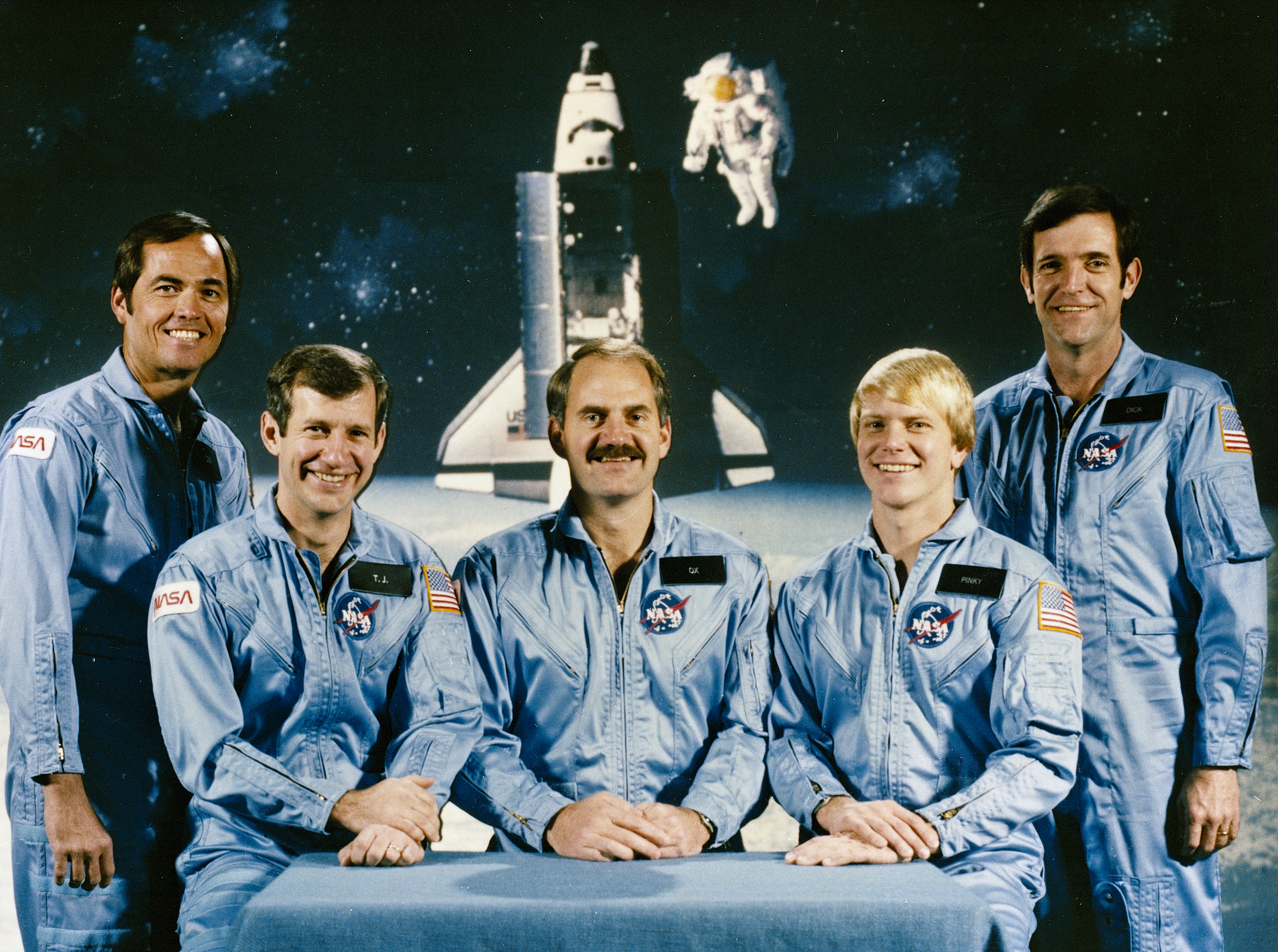
Hart (2nd from left) with STS-41-C crewmates

STS-41-C Challenger was launched from Kennedy Space Center in Merritt Island, Florida, on April 6, 1984. The crew included Robert Crippen (spacecraft commander), Dick Scobee (pilot), and fellow mission specialists, George D. Nelson and James van Hoften. During this mission, the crew successfully deployed the Long Duration Exposure Facility (LDEF); retrieved the ailing Solar Maximum Satellite, repaired it on board Challenger, and replaced it in orbit using the robot arm called the Remote Manipulator System (RMS). The mission also included flight testing of Manned Maneuvering Units (MMUs) in two extravehicular activities (EVAs); operation of the Cinema 360 and IMAX camera systems, as well as a bee hive honeycomb structures student experiment. Mission duration was 7 days before landing at Edwards Air Force Base in Edwards, California, on April 13, 1984.

=== Private sector ===
From 1968 to 1978, Hart was employed as a member of the technical staff of Bell Labs. His principal duties included electrical and mechanical design responsibilities for a variety of electronic power equipment used in the Bell System. He has received two patents. He left Bell Labs in 1978 upon selection as a NASA Astronaut candidate.

After leaving NASA, he was the director of engineering and operations for AT&T's satellite network.

=== Lehigh University ===
Hart is currently a member of the engineering faculty at Lehigh University in Bethlehem, Pennsylvania.

== Organizations ==
He is a member of the Institute of Electrical and Electronics Engineers, Tau Beta Pi, Sigma Xi, and Delta Upsilon.

== Awards and citations ==
Hart received the following awards and honors:

- National Defense Service Medal
- NASA Space Flight Medal
- Outstanding Officer of Undergraduate Pilot Training Class (1970)
- Rutgers Distinguished Alumnus Award
