= Ox (nickname) =

As a nickname, Ox or The Ox may refer to:

== People nicknamed Ox ==
- Jacobus Os du Randt (born 1972), South African rugby union player nicknamed his Afrikaans nickname, which means Ox,
- Oscar Ox Eckhardt (1901–1951), American Major League Baseball and National Football League player
- Grover Ox Emerson (1907–1998), American National Football League player
- Okey Geffin (1921–2004), South African rugby union player nicknamed "Ox" while a World War II prisoner of war
- Fred Ox McKibbon, 1920s college football player
- John Ox Miller (1915–2007), American Major League Baseball pitcher
- Retshegofaditswe Ox Nché (born 1995), South African rugby union player nicknamed "Ox"
- Owen Ox Parry (1914–1976), American National Football League player
- James van Hoften (born 1944), American astronaut, US Navy officer and aviator and engineer

== People nicknamed The Ox ==
- Ox Baker (1934-2014), ring names of American professional wrestler and actor Douglas Baker
- John Entwistle (1944–2002), English musician, bassist of the band The Who
- Alex Oxlade-Chamberlain (born 1993), English footballer
- Tomasso Petto (1879–1905), New York mobster and hitman
- Charles Reiser (1878–1921), American safecracker and murderer
- David Schwarz (footballer) (born 1972), retired Australian rules footballer and radio personality
- Öküz Mehmed Pasha (Mehmed Pasha the Ox) (died 1619), Ottoman statesman, Grand Vizier and military commander

== See also ==
- Ox (disambiguation)
