= Wild ox =

Wild ox may refer to:

== Animals ==
- Aurochs, or wild ox
- Kouprey, sometimes called wild ox
- Banteng, or wild ox
- Gaur, or wild ox
- Re'em, a Biblical animal sometimes translated as wild ox

== People ==
- Vsevolod IV of Kiev, or Wsiewolod the Wild Ox

== See also ==
- Ox (disambiguation)
