= 0X =

0X or 0-X ("zero/oh ex") may refer to:

== Computing ==
- 0x, prefix for a hexadecimal numeric constant
- C++11, standard for the C++ programming language (previously C++0x)

== In fiction ==
- Zero-X, a spacecraft from the Thunderbirds and Captain Scarlett puppet series
- 0̅X̅, a living cellular automaton from the Of Man and Manta novels

== Vehicle ==
- Zero X, an electric motorcycle model

== See also ==
- Ox (disambiguation)
- X0 (disambiguation)
- Zerox (fictional planet), in DC Comics
