= STS-41-C =

1984 American crewed spaceflight to the Solar Maximum Mission satellite

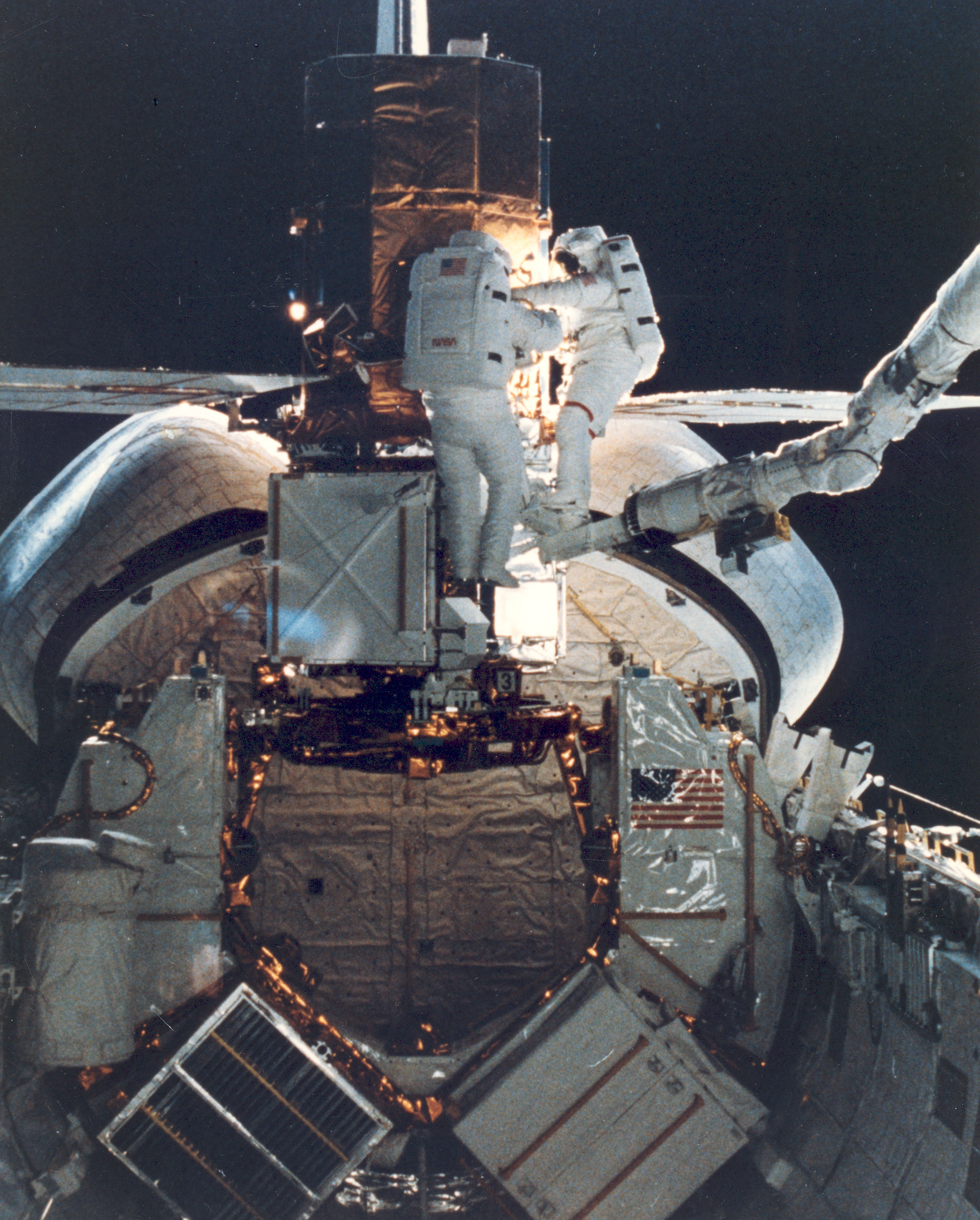
- Mission Specialists George Nelson and James van Hoften repair the captured Solar Maximum Mission satellite on April 11, 1984
- Names: Space Transportation System-41C; STS-13
- Mission type: Satellite deployment Satellite repair
- Operator: NASA
- COSPAR ID: 1984-034A
- SATCAT no.: 14897
- Mission duration: 6 days, 23 hours, 40 minutes, 7 seconds
- Distance travelled: 4,620,000 km (2,870,000 mi)
- Orbits completed: 108

Spacecraft properties
- Spacecraft: Space Shuttle Challenger
- Launch mass: 115,328 kg (254,255 lb)
- Landing mass: 89,346 kg (196,974 lb)
- Payload mass: 15,345 kg (33,830 lb)

Crew
- Crew size: 5
- Members: Robert Crippen; Dick Scobee; Terry Hart; James van Hoften; George Nelson
- EVAs: 2
- EVA duration: 10 hours, 6 minutes; 1st EVA: 2 hours, 59 minutes; 2nd EVA: 7 hours, 7 minutes

Start of mission
- Launch date: April 6, 1984, 13:58:00 UTC (8:58 am EST)
- Launch site: Kennedy, LC-39A
- Contractor: Rockwell International

End of mission
- Landing date: April 13, 1984, 13:38:07 UTC (5:38:07 am PST)
- Landing site: Edwards, Runway 17

Orbital parameters
- Reference system: Geocentric orbit
- Regime: Low Earth orbit
- Perigee altitude: 222 km (138 mi)
- Apogee altitude: 428 km (266 mi)
- Inclination: 28.50°
- Period: 91.40 minutes
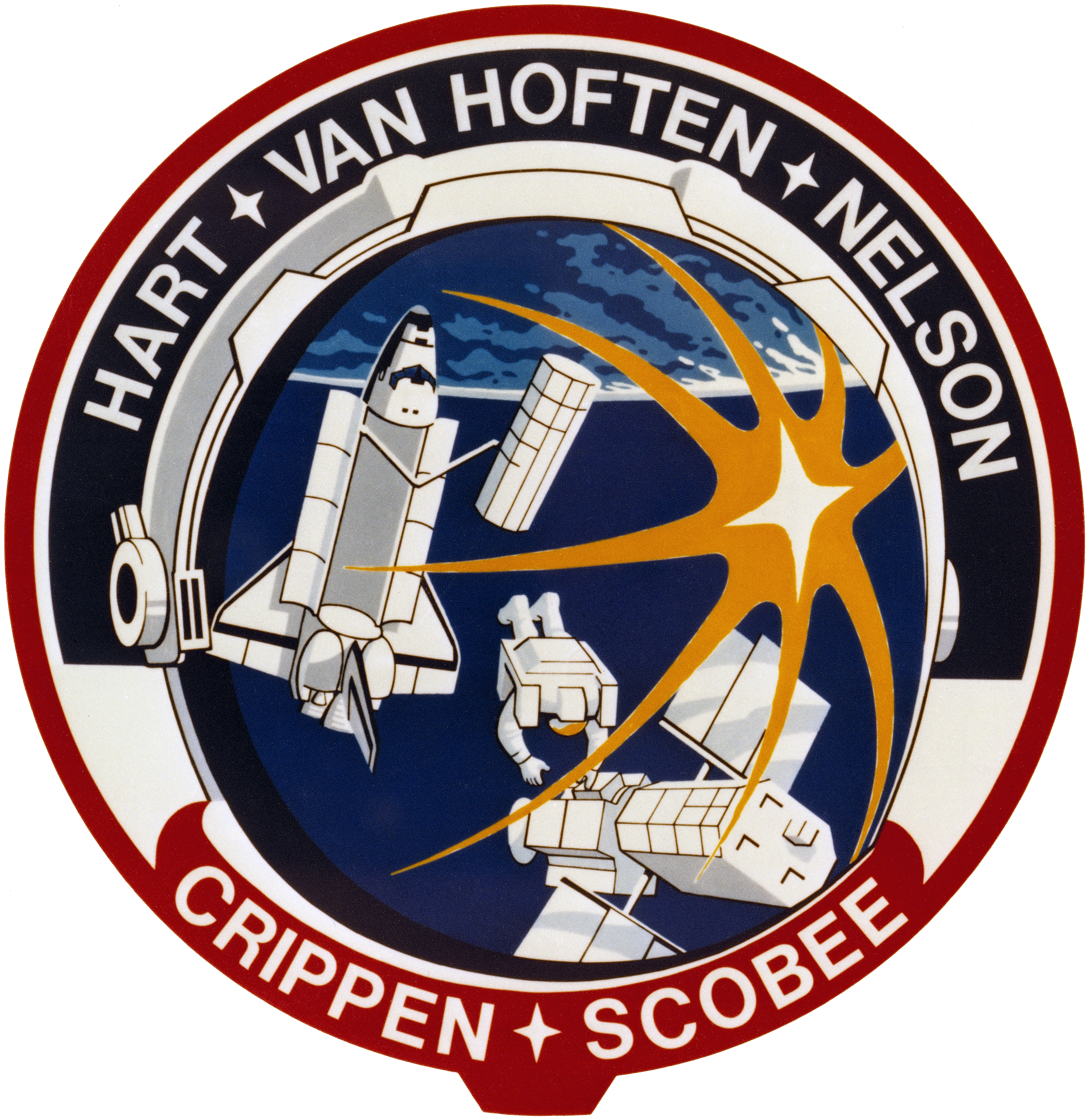
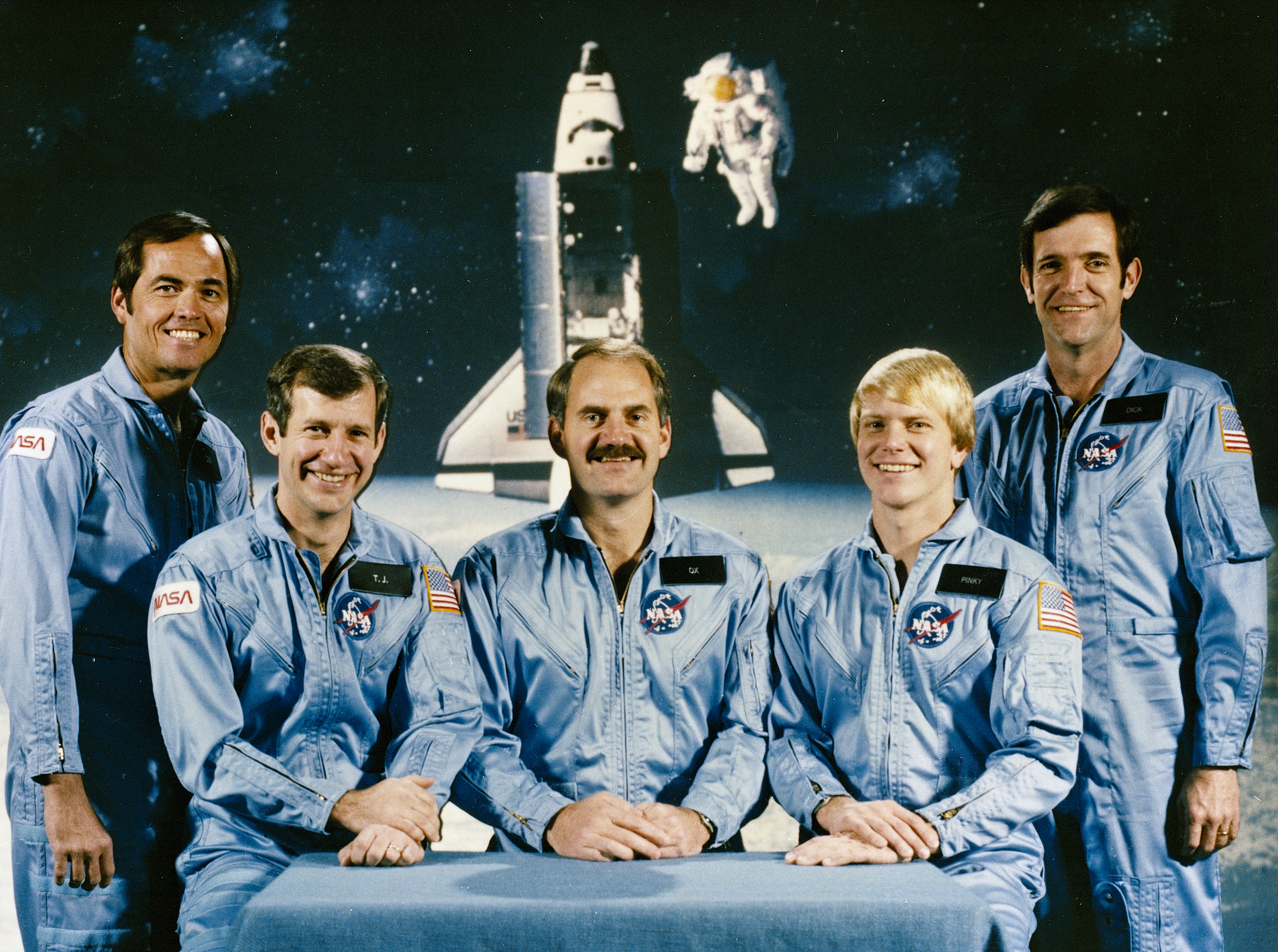
- STS-41-C mission patch From left: Crippen, Hart, van Hoften, Nelson and Scobee Space Shuttle program

STS-41-C (formerly STS-13) was NASA's eleventh Space Shuttle mission, and the fifth mission of Space Shuttle Challenger. The launch, which took place on April 6, 1984, marked the first direct ascent trajectory for a Space Shuttle mission. During the mission, Challenger's crew captured and repaired the malfunctioning Solar Maximum Mission ("Solar Max") satellite, and deployed the Long Duration Exposure Facility (LDEF) experimental apparatus. STS-41-C was extended one day due to problems capturing the Solar Max satellite, and the landing on April 13, 1984, took place at Edwards Air Force Base, instead of at Kennedy Space Center as had been planned. The flight was originally numbered STS-13.

== Crew ==
Position	Astronaut
Commander	Robert Crippen; Third spaceflight
Pilot	Francis R. 'Dick' Scobee; First space mission Only spaceflight
Mission Specialist 1	Terry Hart; Only spaceflight
Mission Specialist 2 Flight Engineer	James van Hoften; First spaceflight
Mission Specialist 3	George Nelson; First spaceflight

=== Spacewalks ===
EVA 1

- Personnel: Nelson and van Hoften
- Date: April 8, 1984 (14:18–17:17 UTC)
- Duration: 2 hours, 59 minutes

EVA 2

- Personnel: Nelson and van Hoften
- Date: April 11, 1984 (08:58–16:05 UTC)
- Duration: 7 hours, 7 minutes

=== Crew seat assignments ===
Seat	Launch	Landing	Seats 1–4 are on the flight deck. Seats 5–7 are on the mid-deck.
1	Crippen		Seats 1–4 are on the flight deck. Seats 5–7 are on the mid-deck.
2	Scobee		Seats 1–4 are on the flight deck. Seats 5–7 are on the mid-deck.
3	Hart	Nelson	Seats 1–4 are on the flight deck. Seats 5–7 are on the mid-deck.
4	van Hoften		Seats 1–4 are on the flight deck. Seats 5–7 are on the mid-deck.
5	Nelson	Hart	Seats 1–4 are on the flight deck. Seats 5–7 are on the mid-deck.
6	Unused		Seats 1–4 are on the flight deck. Seats 5–7 are on the mid-deck.
7	Unused		Seats 1–4 are on the flight deck. Seats 5–7 are on the mid-deck.

== Mission summary ==
STS-41-C post flight presentation, narrated by the astronauts (19 minutes).

STS-41-C launched successfully at 8:58 a.m. EST on April 6, 1984. The mission marked the first direct ascent trajectory for the Space Shuttle; Challenger reached its 533 km-high (331 mi) orbit using its Orbiter Maneuvering System (OMS) engines only once, to circularize its orbit. During the ascent phase, the main computer in Mission control center (MCC) failed, as did the backup computer. For about an hour, the controllers had no data on the orbiter.

The flight had two primary objectives. The first was to deploy the Long Duration Exposure Facility (LDEF), a passive, retrievable, 12-sided experimental cylinder. The 9,700 kg (21,400 lb) LDEF was 4.3 m (14 ft) in diameter and 9.1 m (30 ft) long, and carried 57 scientific experiments. The second objective of STS-41-C was to capture, repair and redeploy the malfunctioning Solar Maximum Mission satellite ("Solar Max"), which had been launched in 1980.

On the second day of the flight, the LDEF was grappled by the Remote Manipulator System (Canadarm) and successfully released into orbit. Its 57 experiments, mounted in 86 removable trays, were contributed by 200 researchers from eight countries. Retrieval of the passive LDEF was initially scheduled for 1985, but schedule delays and the Challenger disaster of 1986 postponed the retrieval until January 12, 1990, when Columbia retrieved the LDEF during STS-32.

On the third day of the mission, Challenger's orbit was raised to about 560 km (350 mi), and it maneuvered to within 61 m (200 ft) of the stricken Solar Max satellite. Astronauts Nelson and van Hoften, wearing space suits, entered the payload bay. Nelson, using the Manned Maneuvering Unit (MMU), flew out to the satellite and attempted to grasp it with a special capture tool, called the Trunnion Pin Acquisition Device (TPAD). Three attempts to clamp the TPAD onto the satellite failed. Solar Max began tumbling on multiple axes when Nelson attempted to grab one of the satellite's solar arrays by hand, and the effort was called off. Crippen had to perform multiple maneuvers of the orbiter to keep up with Nelson and Solar Max, and nearly ran out of RCS fuel.

During the night of the third day, the Solar Max Payload Operations Control Center (POCC), located at Goddard Space Flight Center (GSFC), Greenbelt, Maryland, was able to establish control over the satellite by sending commands ordering the satellite's magnetorquers to stabilize its tumbling. This was successful, and Solar Max went into a slow, regular spin. The next day, Crippen maneuvered Challenger back to Solar Max, and Hart was able to grapple the satellite with the RMS. They placed Solar Max on a special cradle in the payload bay using the RMS. Nelson and van Hoften then began the repair operation, replacing the satellite's attitude control mechanism and the main electronics system of the coronagraph instrument. The ultimately successful repair effort took two separate spacewalks. Solar Max was deployed back into orbit the next day. After a 30-day checkout by the Goddard POCC, the satellite resumed full operation.

Other STS-41-C mission activities included a student experiment located in a middeck locker which found that honeybees can successfully make honeycomb cells in a microgravity environment. Highlights of the mission, including the LDEF deployment and the Solar Max repair, were filmed using an IMAX movie camera, and the results appeared in the 1985 IMAX movie The Dream is Alive.

The 6 days, 23 hours, 40 minutes, and 7 seconds mission ended on April 13, 1984, at 5:38 a.m. PST, when Challenger landed safely on Runway 17, at Edwards Air Force Base, having completed 108 orbits. Challenger was returned to KSC on April 18, 1984.

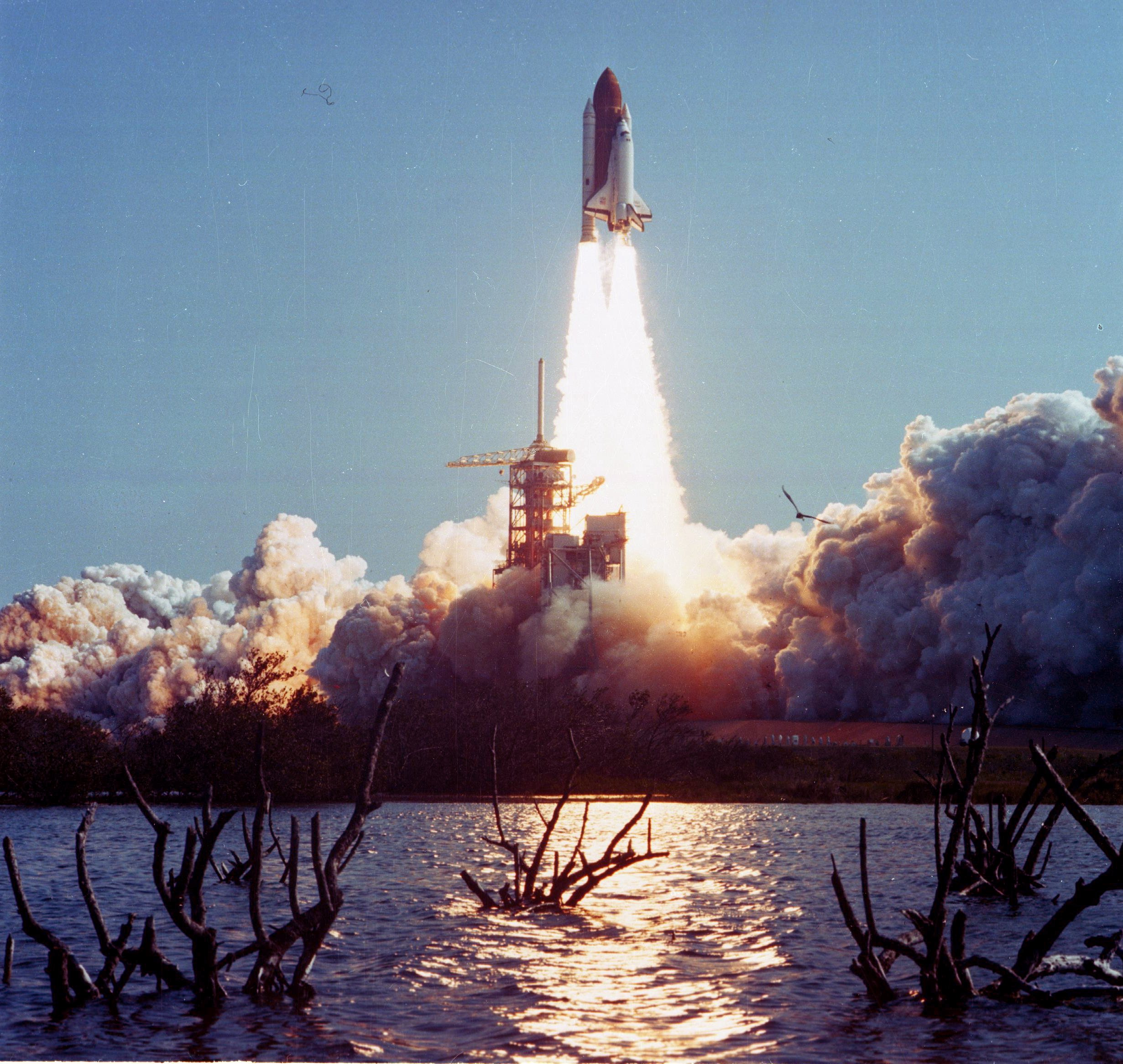
The launch of STS-41-C on 6 April 1984

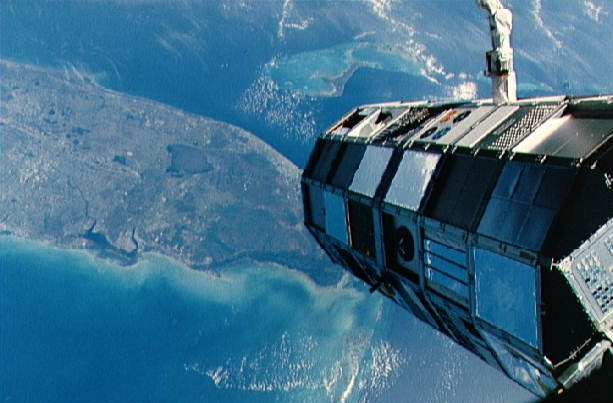
The deployed Long Duration Exposure Facility (LDEF), which became an important source of information on the small-particle space debris environment.

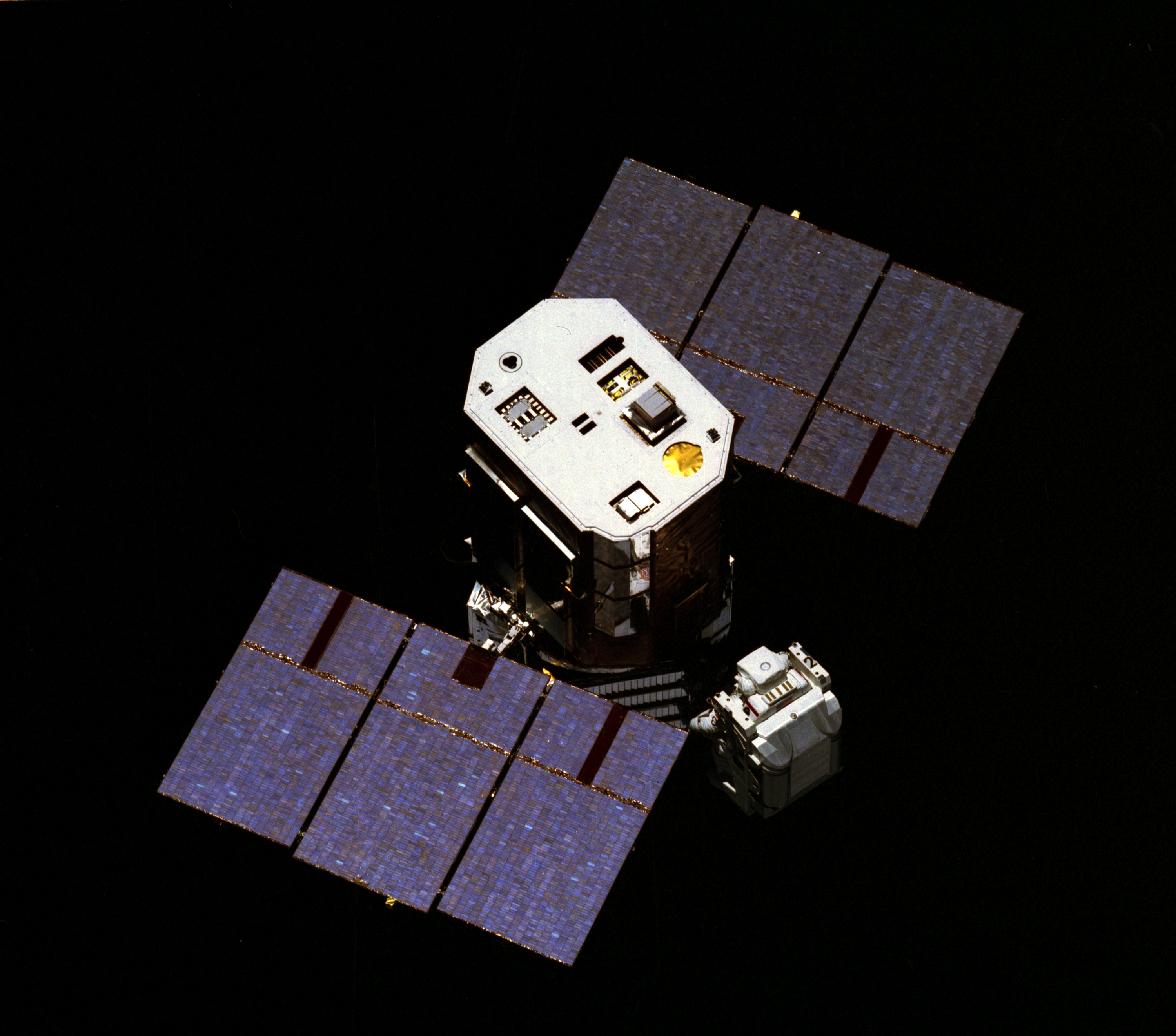
George Nelson attempts to capture the Solar Maximum Mission satellite.

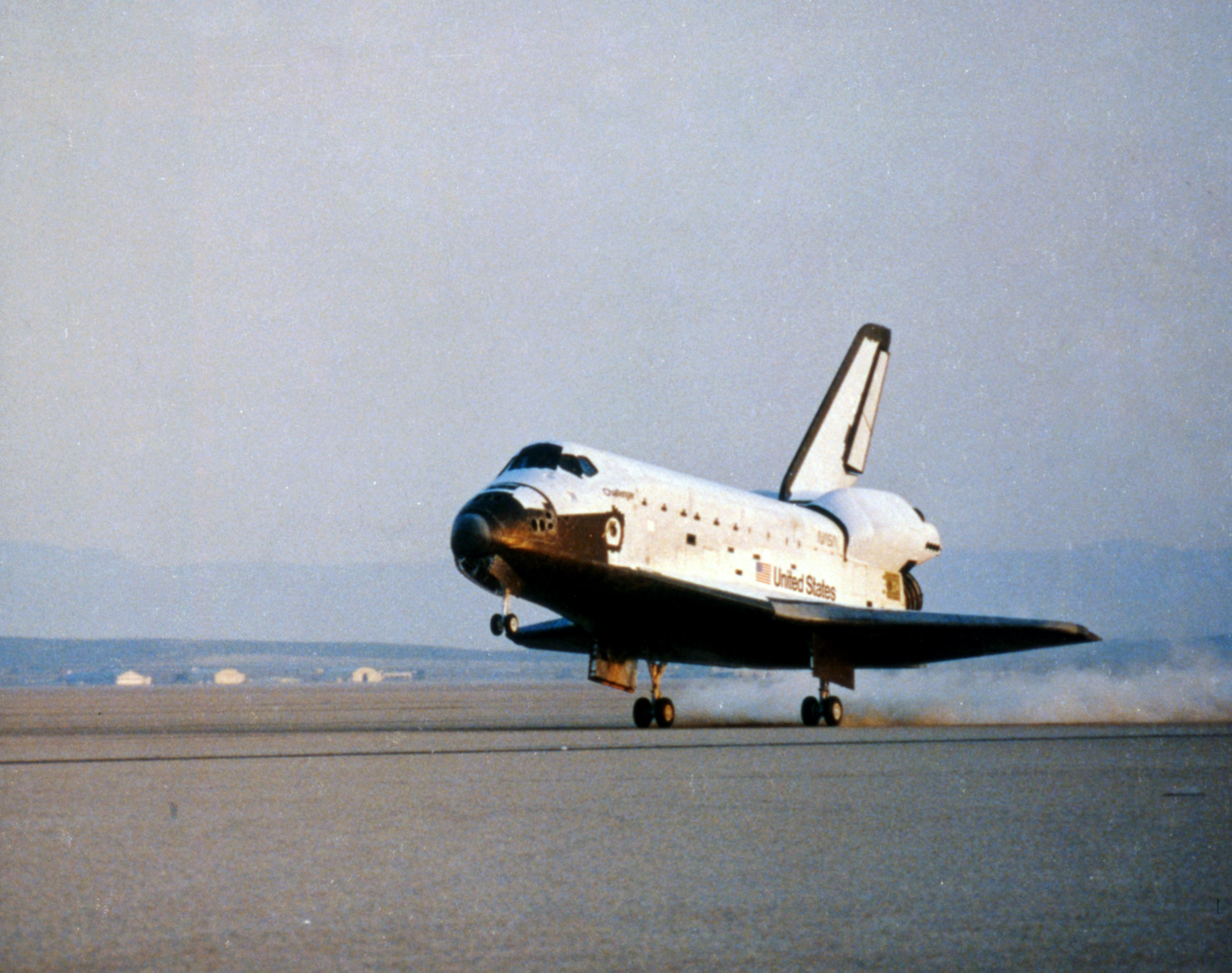
STS-41-C touches down at Runway 17, Edwards Air Force Base, on 13 April 1984.

== Wake-up calls ==
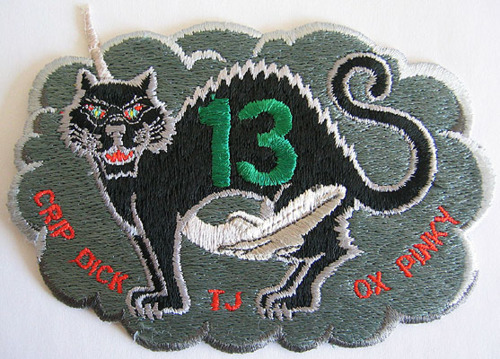
Alternate mission patch, referencing the mission's original designation, STS-13; and landing under a black cat, given that April 13, 1984, was a Friday the 13th.

NASA began a tradition of playing music to astronauts during the Project Gemini, and first used music to wake up a flight crew during Apollo 15. Each track is specially chosen, often by the astronauts' families, and usually has a special meaning to an individual member of the crew, or is applicable to their daily activities.

Flight Day	Song	Artist/Composer
Day 2	"A Boy Named Sue"	Johnny Cash
Day 3	"Fight for California"	UC Berkeley Fight Song
Day 4	Unidentified	
Day 5	"Theme from Rocky"	Bill Conti
Day 6	Unidentified	
Day 7	None	
Day 8	"University of Texas Fight Song"	

== See also ==
- List of human spaceflights
- List of Space Shuttle missions
- Lists of spacewalks and moonwalks
