= George Nelson (astronaut) =

American astronomer and astronaut (born 1950)

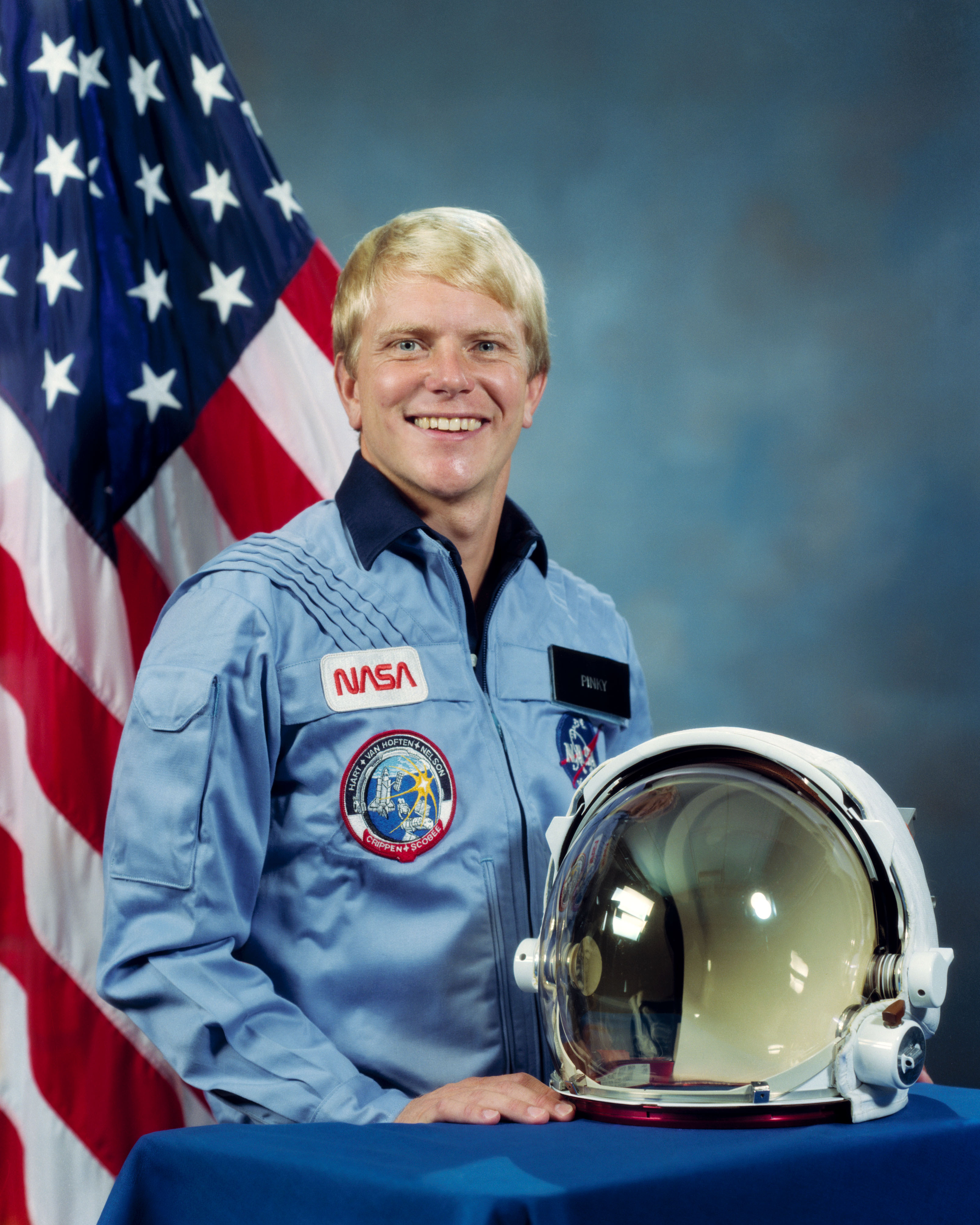
- Nelson in 1984
- Born: George Driver Nelson; July 13, 1950 (age 76); Charles City, Iowa, U.S.
- Other name: Pinky
- Education: Harvey Mudd College (BS); University of Washington (MS, PhD)
- Space career

NASA astronaut
- Time in space: 17d 2h 43m
- Selection: NASA Group 8 (1978)
- Total EVAs: 2
- Total EVA time: 10h 6m
- Missions: STS-41-C; STS-61-C; STS-26
- Retired: June 30, 1989

George Driver "Pinky" Nelson (born July 13, 1950) is an American physicist, astronomer, science educator, and retired NASA astronaut.

== Early life and education ==
Nelson was born on July 13, 1950, in Charles City, Iowa, but considers Willmar, Minnesota, to be his hometown. He graduated from Willmar Senior High School, Willmar, Minnesota, in 1968. He received a Bachelor of Science degree in physics from Harvey Mudd College in 1972, and a Master of Science and a Doctor of Philosophy degrees in astronomy from the University of Washington in 1974 and 1978, respectively.

Nelson was a Boy Scout and earned the rank of First Class Scout.

His wife, Susie, is from Alhambra, California. They have two daughters, Aimee Tess (born April 25, 1972) and Marti Ann (born February 27, 1975). Pinky enjoys playing golf, reading, swimming, running, and music.

== Research ==
Nelson performed astronomical research at the Sacramento Peak Solar Observatory, Sunspot, New Mexico; the Astronomical Institute at Utrecht (Utrecht, Netherlands) and the University of Göttingen Observatory, (Göttingen, West Germany), and at the Joint Institute for Laboratory Astrophysics (Boulder, Colorado). His last research was in systemic education reform and the preparation of science teachers.

== NASA career ==
George was selected as an astronaut candidate by NASA in January 1978. He flew as a scientific equipment operator in the WB-57F earth resources aircraft and served as the Astronaut Office representative in the Space Shuttle Extravehicular Mobility Unit (space suit) development effort. During STS-1 he was the photographer in the prime chase plane. He also served as support crewman and CAPCOM for the last two OFT flights, STS-3 and STS-4, and as head of the Astronaut Office Mission Development Group. A veteran of three space flights, Nelson served aboard STS-41-C in 1984, STS-61C in 1986 and STS-26 in 1988. He has logged a total of 411 hours in space, including 10 hours of EVA flight time.

=== Spaceflight experience ===
==== STS-41-C Challenger ====
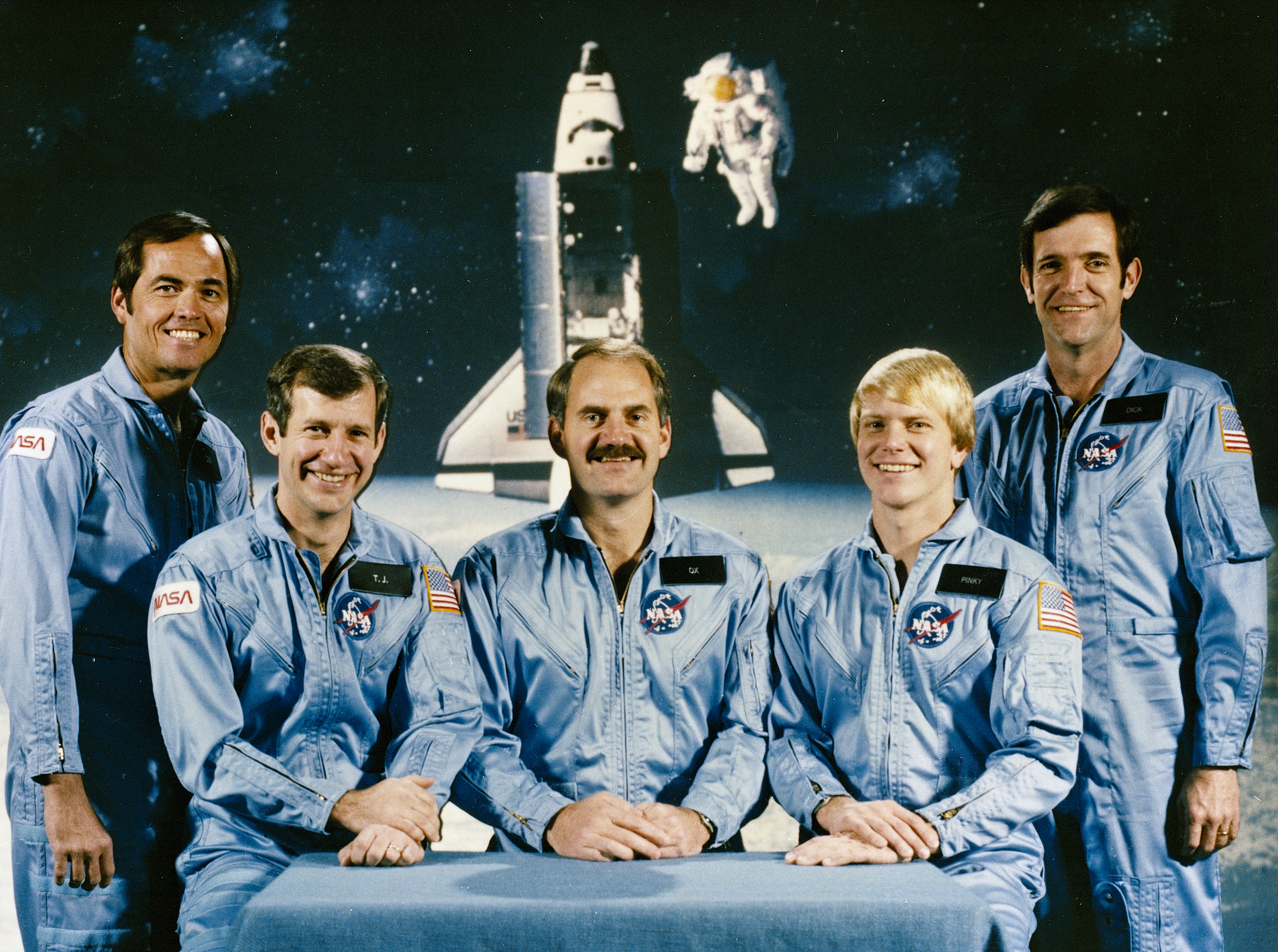
Nelson (2nd from right) with STS-41-C crewmates

This was a seven-day (April 6–13, 1984) mission during which the crew successfully deployed the Long Duration Exposure Facility (LDEF), retrieved the ailing Solar Maximum satellite, repaired it on board the Orbiter, and replaced it in orbit. The mission also included flight testing of Manned Maneuvering Units (MMUs) in two extravehicular activities (EVAs), and operation of the Cinema 360 and IMAX Camera Systems. Nelson performed EVAs in support of the satellite retrieval and the MMU testing.

==== STS-61-C Columbia ====
This mission, from January 12–18, 1986, launched from the Kennedy Space Center and returned to a night landing at Edwards Air Force Base, California. During the six-day flight, the crew deployed the SATCOM KU satellite and conducted experiments in astrophysics and materials processing. STS-61-C was the last shuttle mission before the Space Shuttle Challenger disaster, which occurred ten days after STS-61-C's landing.

==== STS-26 Discovery ====
This mission (September 29–October 3, 1988) was the first flown after the Challenger accident. During the four-day flight, the crew successfully deployed the Tracking and Data Relay Satellite (TDRS-C) and operated eleven mid-deck science experiments. The mission completed 64 orbits of the Earth and landed on October 3, 1988.

== Post-NASA career ==
Nelson left NASA in June 1989, became an assistant provost at the University of Washington, and now directs the Science, Mathematics and Technology Education program at Western Washington University in Bellingham. He is also the principal investigator of the North Cascades and Olympic Science Partnership, a mathematics and science partnership grant from the National Science Foundation. Nelson served as faculty on the Fall 2013 Semester at Sea voyage, where he taught introductory astronomy and celestial navigation.

== Honors ==
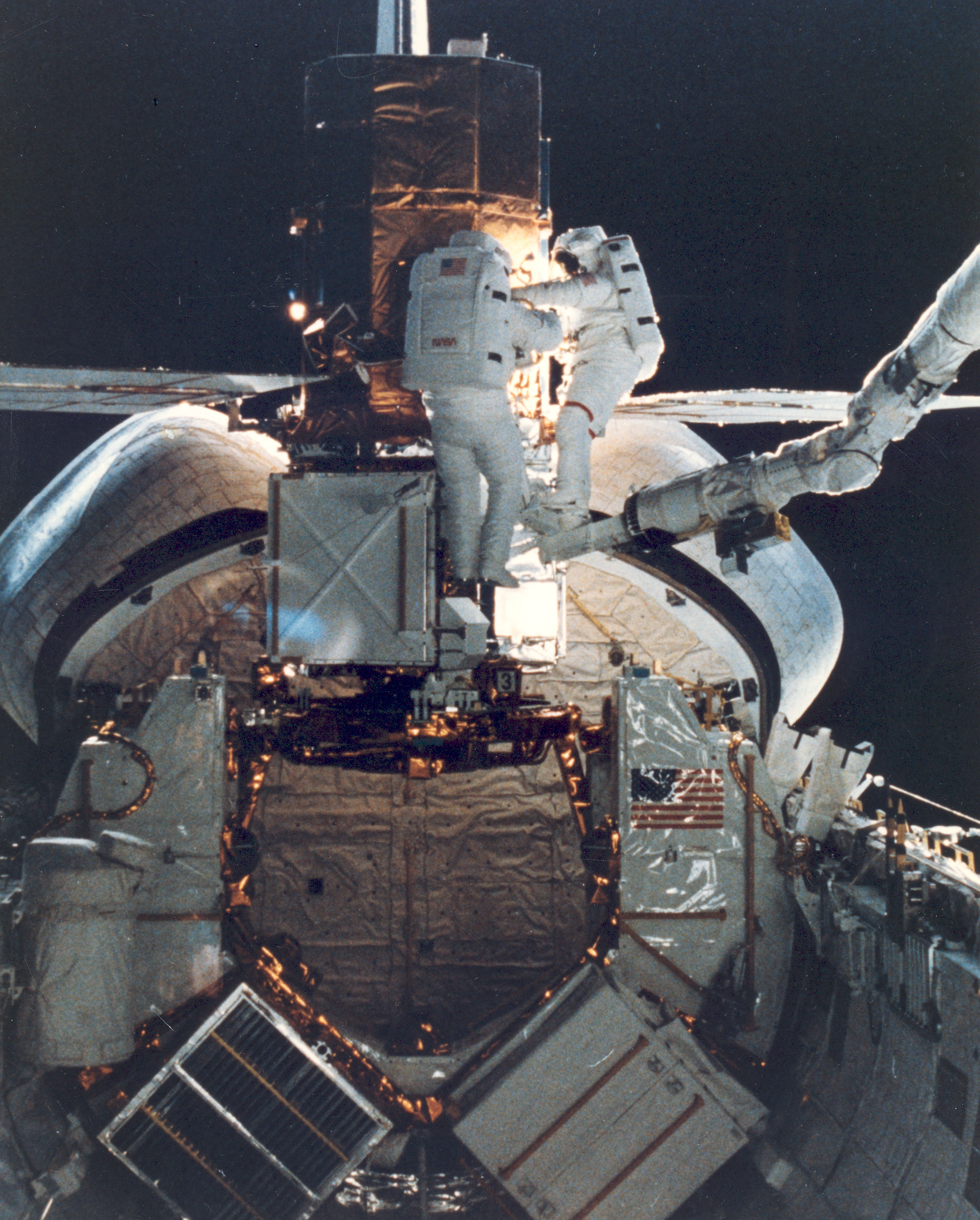
Astronauts Van Hoften and Nelson (right) during their EVA

NASA Exceptional Engineering Achievement Medal, NASA Exceptional Service Medal, 3 NASA Space Flight Medals, AIAA Haley Space Flight Award, Fédération Aéronautique Internationale V. M. Komarov Diploma, Western Washington University Faculty Outstanding Service Award. In 2009, Nelson was inducted into the U.S. Astronaut Hall of Fame. He is also an elected member of Washington State Academy of Science and an Elected Fellow of the American Association for the Advancement of Science.

== See also ==
- List of spaceflight records
