= Ox (disambiguation) =

An ox (plural oxen) is an adult male bovine.

Ox, OX, or oxen may also refer to:

== Arts and entertainment ==
=== Fictional characters ===
- Doctor Ox, a fictional doctor and scientist created by Jules Verne in 1872
- Ox (comics), a villain in the Marvel Comics universe
- Ox, a character in the 2019 film UglyDolls
- 0̅X̅, a creature from the eponymous book in the Of Man and Manta trilogy by Piers Anthony

=== Film and television ===
- The Ox (film), a 1991 Swedish film
- "O X" (Squid Game), 2024 episode of Squid Game
- Oxen (TV series), Danish TV series debuting in 2023

=== Music ===
- Ox (band), a Canadian alternative country band
- Ox (musician), a Finnish musician
- Ox (album), by American hardcore band Coalesce
- "The Ox" (instrumental), a 1965 rock instrumental by The Who
- Ox-Fanzine, a German punk zine

=== Other arts and entertainment ===
- "The Oxen", a poem by Thomas Hardy published in 1915

== Computing ==
- Ox programming language
- Open-Xchange, a "collaboration software" suite and the company that sponsors it
- the oX framework for OBIX

== Places ==
- Ox (Belfast restaurant), a restaurant in Belfast, Northern Ireland
- Ox (Portland restaurant), a restaurant in Portland, Oregon, U.S.
- Ox Mountains, County Sligo, Ireland
- OX postcode area, covering Oxford, UK
- The Oxford Bar, a pub in Edinburgh which features in Ian Rankin's Inspector Rebus novels, referred to as "The Ox"

== Transport ==
- OX, a version of the Bedford OY British Army lorry, the latter introduced in 1939
- OX, a prototype vehicle developed by Global Vehicle Trust
- OX, IATA code for Orient Thai Airlines
- TruckMasters OX, a pickup truck sold in Finland as a rebadged Toyota Hilux

== Other uses ==
- Ox (Chinese constellation), one of the 28 mansions of the Chinese constellations
- Ox (nickname), a list of people nicknamed "Ox" or "the Ox"
- Ox (zodiac), one of the 12 signs of the Chinese zodiac
- Oxalate, in chemistry sometimes abbreviated as ox when it forms coordination compounds
- Sendai Television, a Japanese commercial broadcaster also known as Ox

== See also ==
- 0X (disambiguation)
- Oxen in Chinese mythology
- XO (disambiguation)
