= X0 =

X0 may refer to:

== Grammar ==
- X^{0}, denoting a sentence component
  - Zero-level projection, in X-bar theory
  - Head (linguistics), or nucleus

== Science, technology and mathematics ==
- SpaceShipOne flight 15P, a 2004 private spaceflight
- X/0, division by zero
- Turner syndrome, a disorder in which all or part of an X chromosome is absent
- X0 sex-determination system, as found in some insects

== Vehicles ==
- X0, a smaller rigged version of an X1 (dinghy)
- X0, running number for N700 Series Shinkansen prototype from 2014 to 2021

== See also ==
- XO (disambiguation)
- X00, a popular DOS-based FOSSIL driver which was commonly used in the mid 1980s to the late 1990s
- 0X (disambiguation)
