= STS-32 =

1990 American crewed spaceflight to retrieve the Long Duration Exposure Facility

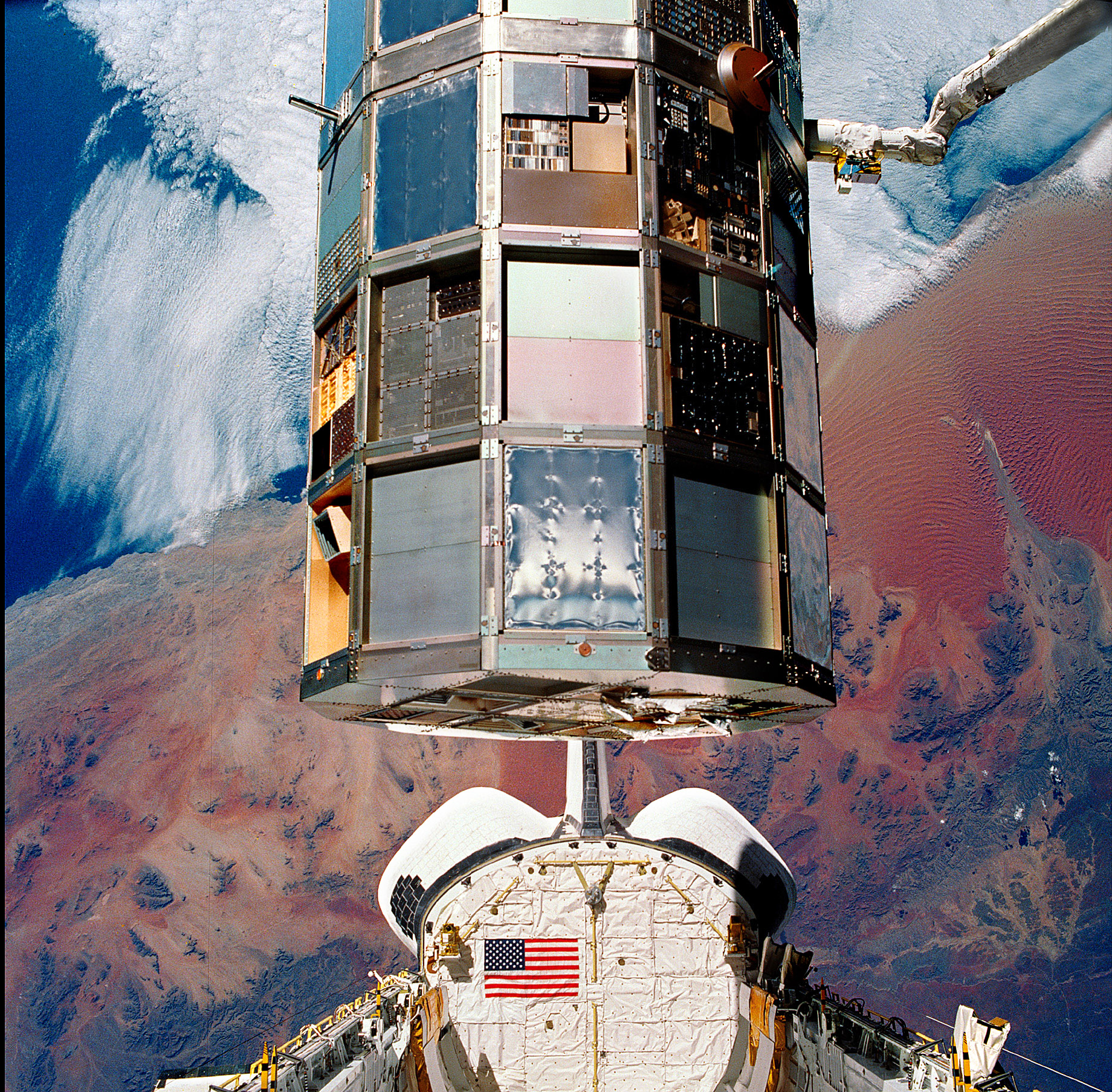
- Columbia retrieves the Long Duration Exposure Facility.
- Names: Space Transportation System-32; STS-32R
- Mission type: Syncom IV-F5 satellite deployment LDEF satellite retrieval
- Operator: NASA
- COSPAR ID: 1990-002A
- SATCAT no.: 20409
- Mission duration: 10 days, 21 hours, 36 seconds
- Distance travelled: 7,258,096 km (4,509,972 mi)
- Orbits completed: 172

Spacecraft properties
- Spacecraft: Space Shuttle Columbia
- Launch mass: 116,117 kg (255,994 lb)
- Landing mass: 103,571 kg (228,335 lb)
- Payload mass: 12,014 kg (26,486 lb)

Crew
- Crew size: 5
- Members: Daniel Brandenstein; Jim Wetherbee; Bonnie J. Dunbar; Marsha Ivins; G. David Low

Start of mission
- Launch date: January 9, 1990, 12:35:00 UTC (7:35 am EST)
- Launch site: Kennedy, LC-39A
- Contractor: Rockwell International

End of mission
- Landing date: January 20, 1990, 09:35:36 UTC (1:35:36 am PST)
- Landing site: Edwards Air Force Base, Runway 22

Orbital parameters
- Reference system: Geocentric orbit
- Regime: Low Earth orbit
- Perigee altitude: 296 km (184 mi)
- Apogee altitude: 361 km (224 mi)
- Inclination: 28.45°
- Period: 91.10 minutes

Instruments
- American Flight Echocardiograph (AFE); Characterization of Neurospora Circadian Rhythms (CNCR); Fluid Experiment Apparatus (FEA); Latitude / Longitude Locator (L3); Mesoscale Lightning Experiment (MLE); Protein Crystal Growth (PCG)
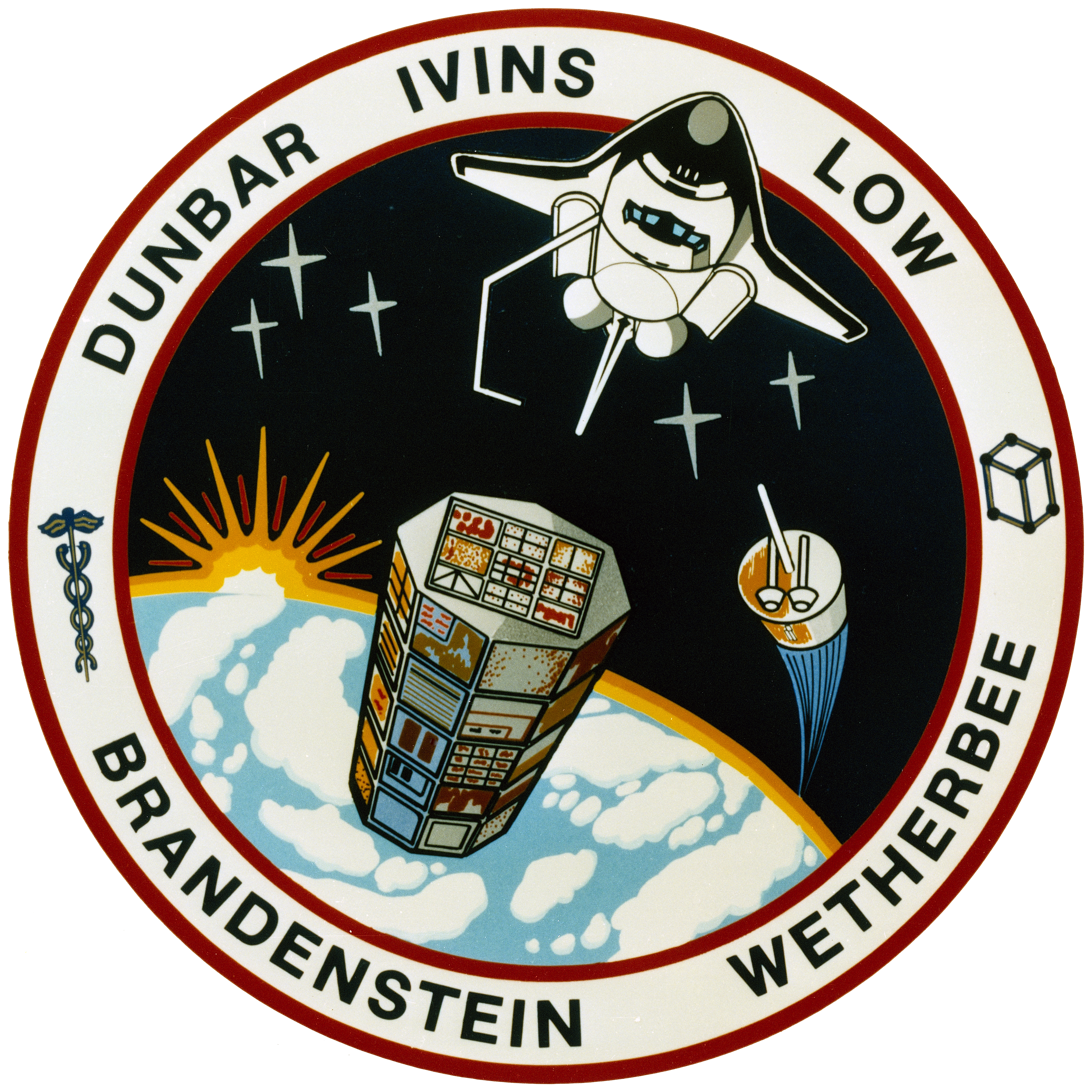
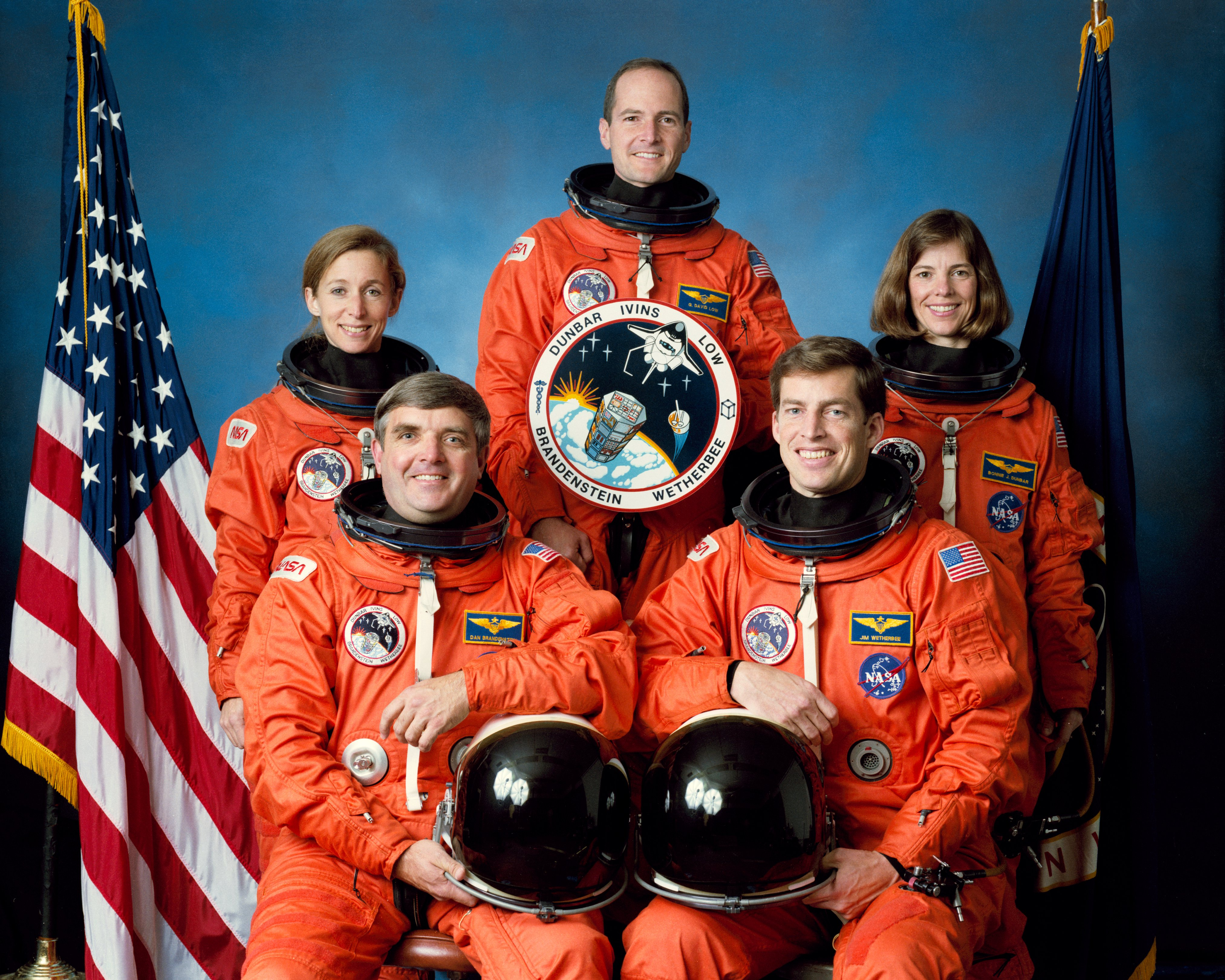
- STS-32 mission patch Standing: Ivins, Low and Dunbar; Seated: Brandenstein and Wetherbee Space Shuttle program

STS-32 was the 33rd mission of NASA's Space Shuttle program, and the ninth launch of Space Shuttle Columbia. Launched on January 9, 1990, it marked the first use of Kennedy Space Center Launch Complex 39A since 1986; it also marked the first use of Mobile Launcher Platform-3 (MLP-3) in the Space Shuttle program. STS-32 was, at the time, the longest shuttle mission yet conducted, with a duration of nearly 11 days. Before STS-32, the only mission of the same duration had been STS-9 in 1983. On January 20, 1990, STS-32 executed the third night landing of the shuttle program. STS-32 was also the first Shuttle mission of the 1990s.

The mission was technically designated STS-32R, as the original STS-32 designator had been used internally for STS-61-C, the 24th Space Shuttle mission. Official documentation and flight paperwork for that mission had contained the designator STS-32 throughout. Flights with the STS-26 through STS-33 designators used the R in their documentation to avoid conflicts in tracking data from one mission to another.

== Crew ==
Position	Astronaut
Commander	Daniel Brandenstein; Third spaceflight
Pilot	Jim Wetherbee; First spaceflight
Mission Specialist 1	Bonnie J. Dunbar; Second spaceflight
Mission Specialist 2 Flight Engineer	Marsha Ivins; First spaceflight
Mission Specialist 3	G. David Low; First spaceflight

=== Crew seat assignments ===
Seat	Launch	Landing	Seats 1–4 are on the flight deck. Seats 5–7 are on the mid-deck.
1	Brandenstein		Seats 1–4 are on the flight deck. Seats 5–7 are on the mid-deck.
2	Wetherbee		Seats 1–4 are on the flight deck. Seats 5–7 are on the mid-deck.
3	Dunbar	Low	Seats 1–4 are on the flight deck. Seats 5–7 are on the mid-deck.
4	Ivins		Seats 1–4 are on the flight deck. Seats 5–7 are on the mid-deck.
5	Low	Dunbar	Seats 1–4 are on the flight deck. Seats 5–7 are on the mid-deck.
6	Unused		Seats 1–4 are on the flight deck. Seats 5–7 are on the mid-deck.
7	Unused		Seats 1–4 are on the flight deck. Seats 5–7 are on the mid-deck.

== Launch preparations ==
STS-32 marked the inaugural launch from Kennedy Space Center Launch Complex 39A following an extensive refurbishment. The pad, which had been inactive since the STS-61-C mission in 1986, underwent significant modifications to enhance safety and operational efficiency. These improvements encompassed upgrades to the crew emergency egress system and shuttle payload bay, increasing anti-freeze protection for water systems, as well as the integration of debris traps for propellant loading and enhanced weather protection measures. A new umbilical system was also installed to provide power, instrumentation, and control for the solid rocket booster field joint heaters.

Concurrently, Mobile Launcher Platform-3 (MLP-3), a legacy structure from the Apollo program, was substantially retrofitted for shuttle operations. This process involved removing the umbilical tower, reconfiguring exhaust vents, and modernizing electrical and mechanical ground support systems.

== Mission summary ==
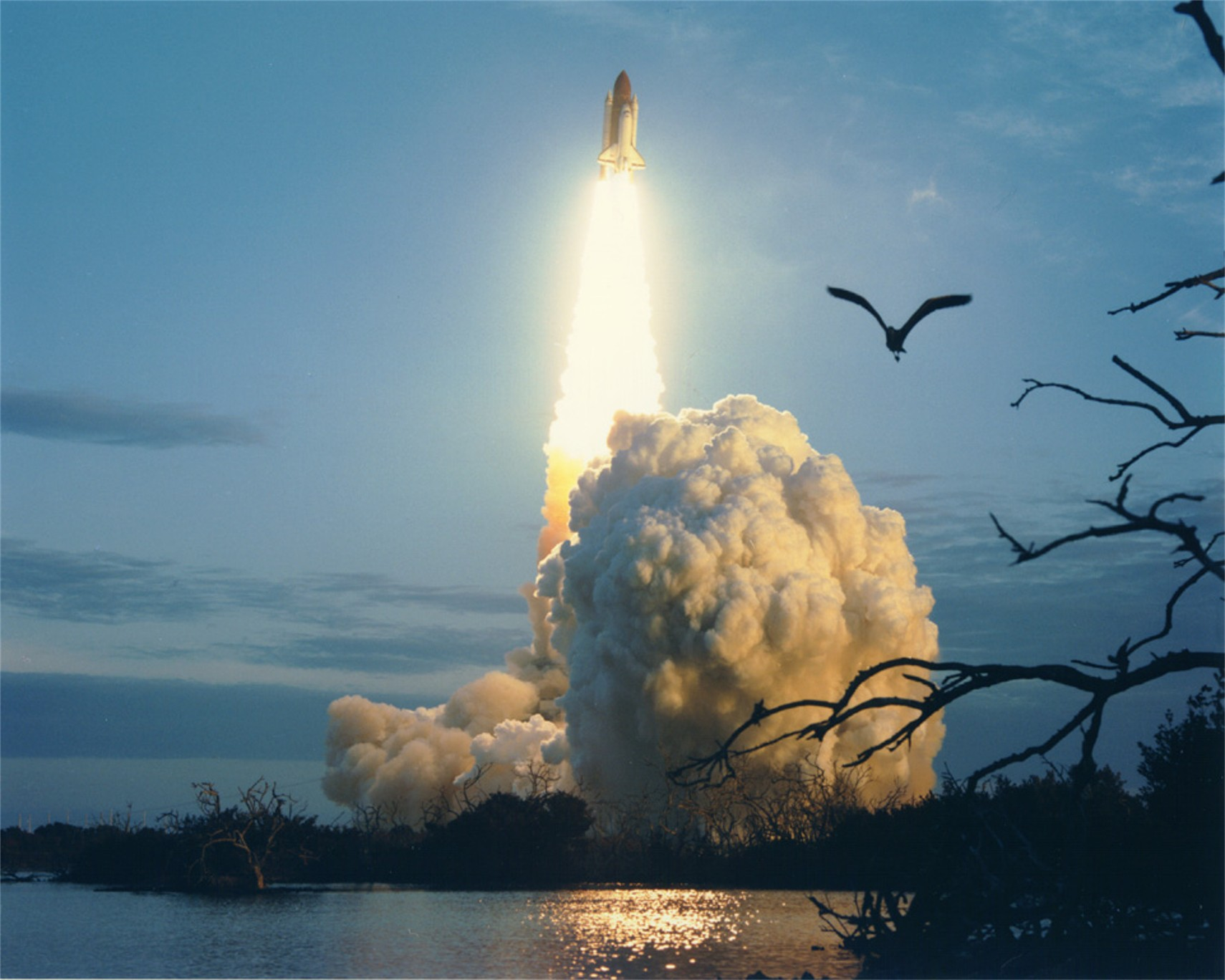
The launch of STS-32 from LC-39A

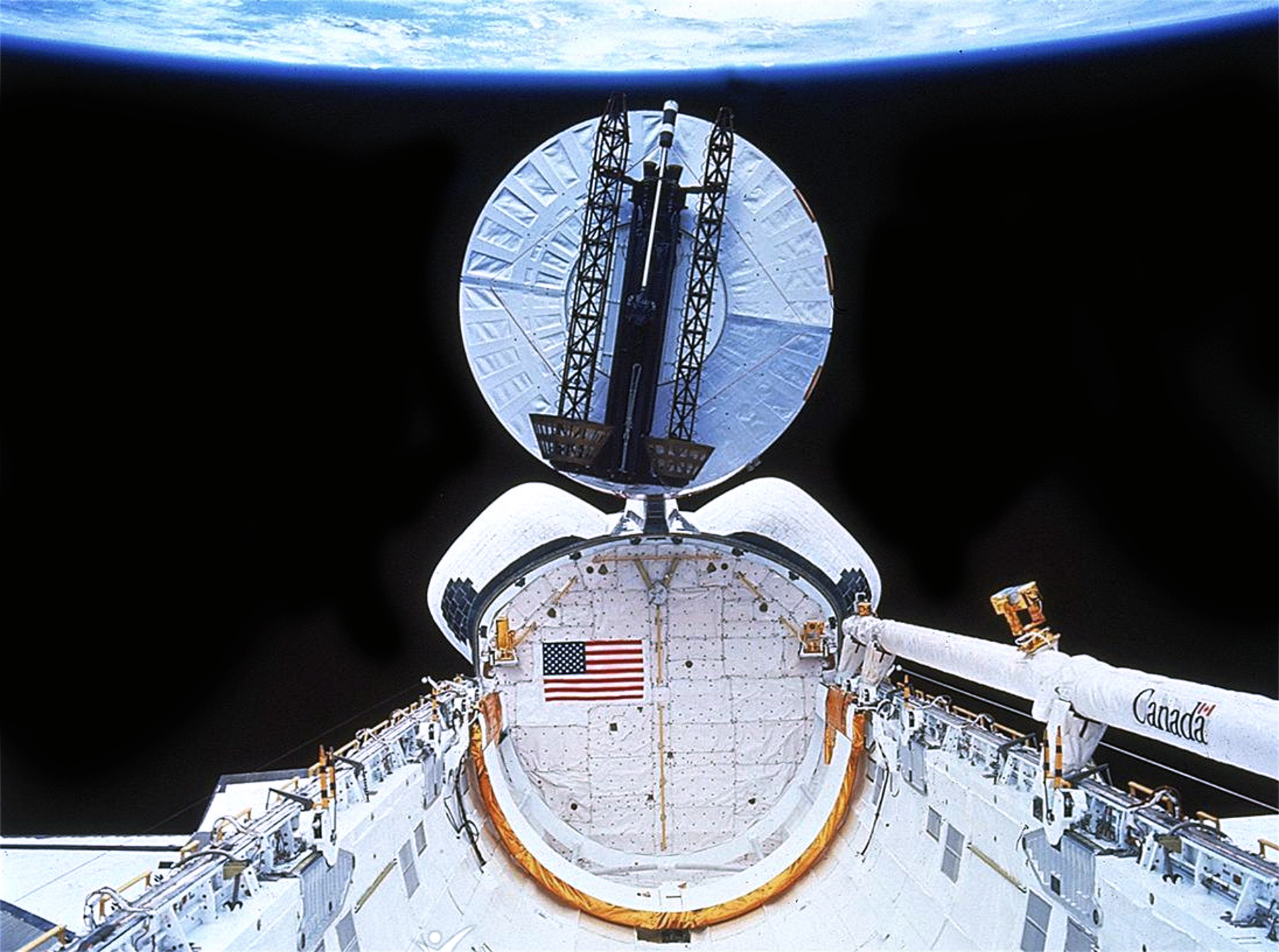
The Syncom IV-F5 satellite is deployed.

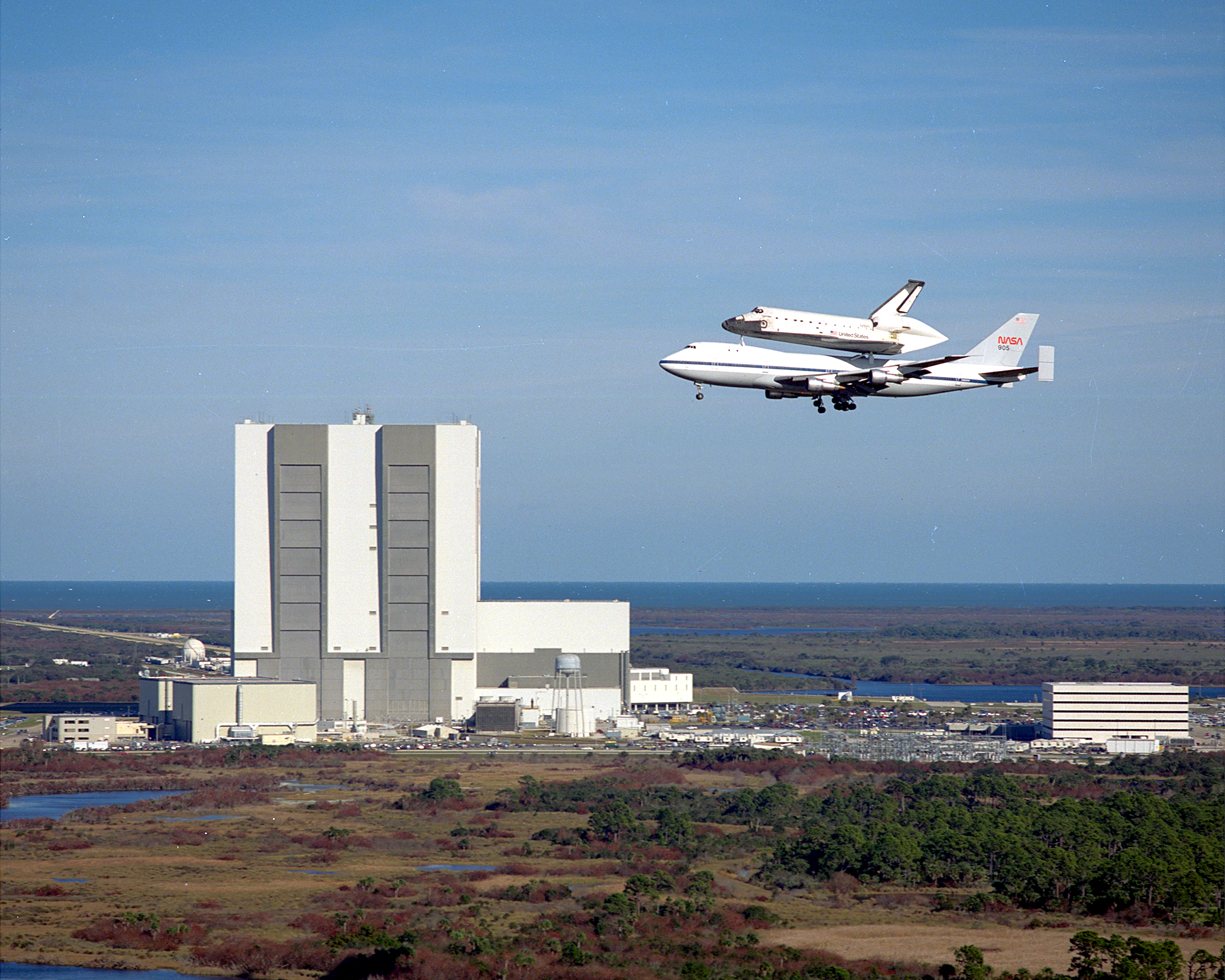
Space Shuttle Columbia, returning to Kennedy Space Center (KSC) after the successful STS-32 mission, flies past the Vehicle Assembly Building at KSC, secured atop the Shuttle Carrier Aircraft.

Attempt	Planned	Result	Turnaround	Reason	Decision point	Weather go (%)	Notes
1	8 Jan 1990, 8:10:00 am	Scrubbed	—	Weather	8 Jan 1990, 9:00 am (T−00:05:00)	10	Low level clouds in the KSC area.
2	9 Jan 1990, 7:35:00 am	Success	0 days 23 hours 25 minutes			90	

STS-32 launched from Kennedy Space Center (KSC), Florida, on January 9, 1990, at 7:35:00 a.m. EST. The launch was initially scheduled for December 18, 1989, but was later postponed to allow the modifications to Pad A to be completed and verified. The second scheduled launch, on January 8, 1990, was aborted due to weather conditions. Columbia had a mission launch weight of 116,117 kg (255,994 lb).

The primary objectives of the mission were to deploy the Syncom IV-F5 military communications satellite (also known as Leasat 5), and to retrieve NASA's Long Duration Exposure Facility (LDEF), whose retrieval had been delayed for 4 1/2 years by scheduling changes and the Challenger disaster of 1986. Syncom IV-F5 (Leasat-5) was deployed on the second flight day, and a third-stage Minuteman solid apogee kick motor propelled it into a geosynchronous orbit. Dunbar retrieved the LDEF on the fourth day of the flight using the shuttle's Remote Manipulator System (Canadarm). The timeliness of the retrieval was of critical importance, because a high rate of solar flux had increased the density of the LDEF's orbital environment and accelerated its rate of orbital decay. Specialists who carefully monitored the stability of the craft's orbit had anticipated that if the LDEF was not retrieved in time, it would pass too low for the shuttle to safely reach, and could be destroyed during re-entry in February 1990. Thus, the mission's exact liftoff time was determined about 12 hours before launch, using the latest tracking data on LDEF. It was flown on a 352 km (219 mi) orbit inclined 28.45° to the equator.

The crew performed a 4 1/2-hour photographic survey of the free-flying structure, which held 57 science, technology and applications experiments. The 12-sided cylinder, about the size of a small bus, was then berthed in the orbiter's payload bay for return to Earth.

NASA had planned to acquire data on the crew members' exposure to long periods of zero gravity, and its effects on the crew's performance while landing the orbiter after an extended mission. STS-32 set a new shuttle duration record of nearly eleven days. An orbiter kit was developed to allow the shuttle to operate for up to 16 days in Earth orbit, and would later make its debut on Columbia's STS-50 mission in 1992.

The retrieval of LDEF was filmed with an IMAX camera, and appeared in the IMAX film Destiny in Space in 1994. Earth observation footage from the camera also appeared in the 1990 film Blue Planet.

Columbia landed safely on January 20, 1990, at 1:35:37 a.m. PST on Runway 22 of Edwards Air Force Base, California. The orbiter had a landing weight of 103,571 kg (228,335 lb). The roll-out distance was 3,271 m (10,732 ft), and the roll-out time was 62 seconds. The orbiter returned to KSC on January 26, 1990.

=== Mid-deck payloads ===
In addition to the Syncom IV-F5 (Leasat-5) satellite, STS-32 carried a number of mid-deck scientific payloads, some of which had already been flown on previous shuttle missions. The experiments included:

- Characterization of Neurospora Circadian Rhythms (CNCR)
- Protein Crystal Growth (PCG)
- Fluid Experiment Apparatus (FEA)
- American Flight Echocardiograph (AFE)
- Latitude / Longitude Locator (L3)
- Mesoscale Lightning Experiment (MLE)
- IMAX camera
- Air Force Maui Optical Site (AMOS) experiment

== Wake-up calls ==
NASA began a tradition of playing music to astronauts during the Project Gemini, and first used music to wake up a flight crew during Apollo 15. Each track is specially chosen, often by the astronauts' families, and usually has a special meaning to an individual member of the crew, or is applicable to their daily activities.

Flight Day	Song	Artist/Composer
Day 2	"What's More American?"	Bing Crosby
Day 3	"The Banana Boat Song" parody	
Day 4	"Let It Snow" parody	
Day 5	"Hello Dolly" parody	
Day 6	"Attack of the Killer Tomatoes"	
Day 7	"Notre Dame Victory March"	
Day 8	"Bow Down to Washington"	University of Washington
Day 9	"Glory, Glory, Colorado"	University of Colorado
Day 10	"Danny Boy"	Larry Bird
Day 11	"Washington and Lee"	Washington and Lee University
Day 12	"Born to Be Wild"	Steppenwolf
Day 13	"Anchors Aweigh"	Charles A. Zimmerman

== Mission insignia ==
The three stars on the left and two stars on the right of STS-32's insignia symbolized the flight's numerical designation in the Space Transportation System's mission sequence. The inverted orbiter on the mission patch reflects the overhead phasing required for rendezvous with LDEF. LDEF had dropped to such a low altitude that the orbiter could not do the usual lower-orbit catch-up because of the thicker atmosphere, and had to reach the LDEF from above.

== See also ==
- List of human spaceflights
- List of Space Shuttle missions
