= Of Man and Manta =

Trilogy of science fiction novels by Piers Anthony

- First edition omnibus (publ. Corgi) 1986
- Omnivore (1968); Orn (1970); 0̅X̅ (1975)
- Author: Piers Anthony
- No. of books: 3

Of Man and Manta is a trilogy of science fiction novels written by Piers Anthony. It consists of the three books: Omnivore (1968), Orn (1970), and 0̅X̅ (1975).

Omnivore has as its frame the investigation of the deaths of eighteen travelers from Earth to the distant planet Nacre. Nacre is seen through the eyes of three surviving scientist-explorers: Cal, Veg, and Aquilon.

The planet Nacre's dominant species are fungi, including the intelligent mantas. The mantas are soft-bodied creatures capable of high speeds and flight, superficially resembling manta rays. They are carnivores who farm the one extant herbivore species by protecting them from the voracious omnivore species. The planet is notable for its thick atmosphere, which allows flight to be performed with less energy, and permits the existence of air-borne phytoplankton. The herbivores eat the plankton, and the omnivores eat anything they can. The human characters' diets play an important role in their interaction with the native species. Aquilon eats a normal human diet—she is an omnivore. Veg is a vegetarian. Cal is forced to drink blood to survive, due to a medical condition.

Orn involves travel by the scientists and mantas into a parallel dimension they dub Paleo, resembling the distant past of Earth, where they encounter dinosaur species and an intelligent flightless bird called Orn. Orn has the ability of genetic memory, able to remember anything that happened to an ancestor prior to the time of their reproduction. Much of the plot conflict stems from the love triangle between the protagonists and the mysterious motives of a cybernetically-augmented government agent sent along to monitor their progress.

0̅X̅ involves the three scientists attempting to return to Earth from another dimension inhabited by hostile machines. Interlopers from other realities (using technology similar to that of the scientists' government) guide and hamper the explorers. A secondary story tells of a multidimensional cellular automaton energy being named 0̅X̅ and its attempts to share living space with an infant human male, a fledgling creature of Orn's species, and one of the manta-carnivores; their developing relationship leads to attempts to learn the reasons for their strange isolation from others of their kind, which eventually ties into the story of Cal, Veg, and Aquilon.

== Reception ==
Lester del Rey found Orn to be "the most enjoyable book by Anthony" to date (1972), an improvement "in many ways" over Omnivore.
