= James van Hoften =

American astronaut and engineer (born 1944)

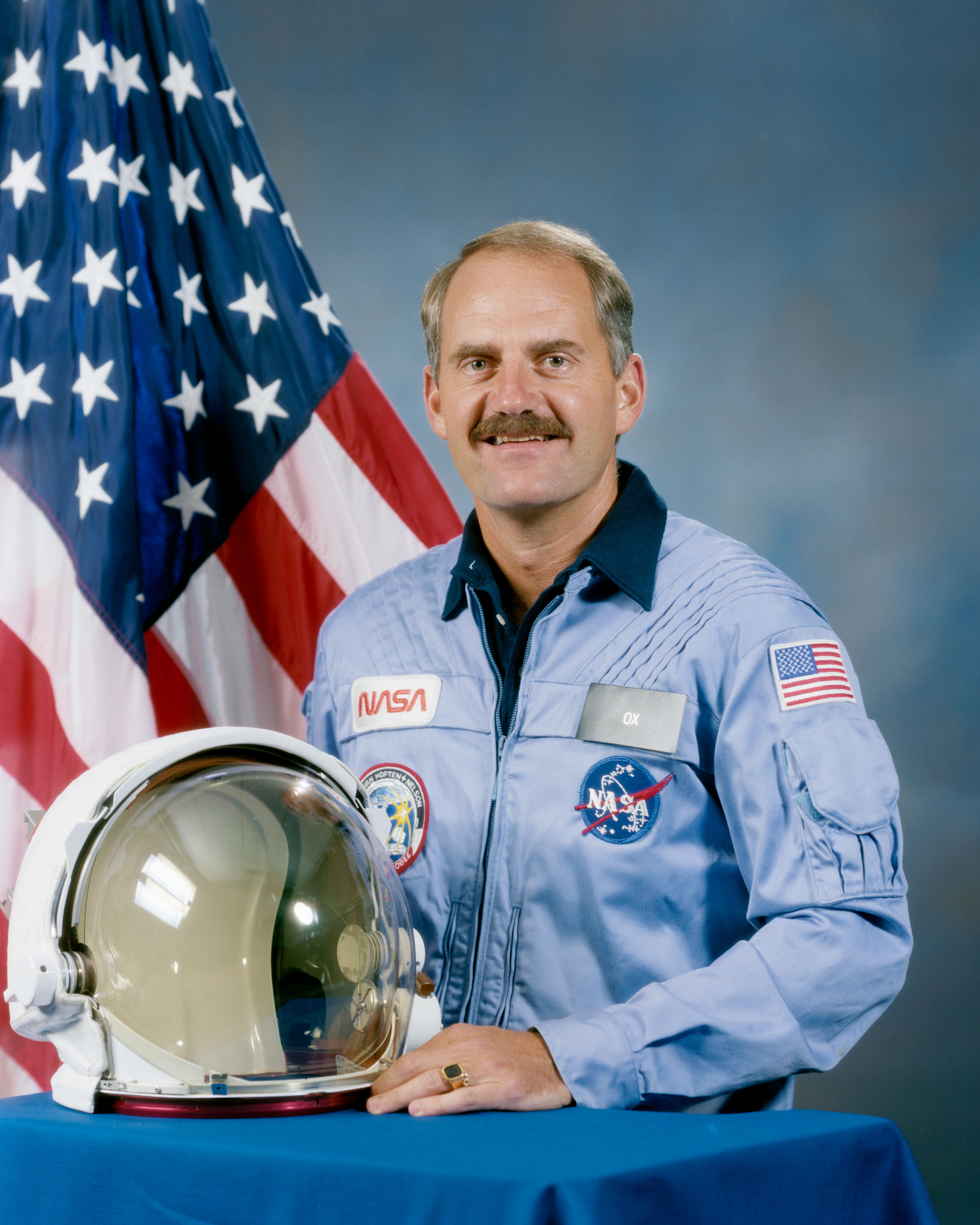
- Born: James Dougal Adrianus van Hoften; June 11, 1944 (age 82); Fresno, California, U.S.
- Other name: Ox
- Education: University of California, Berkeley (BS); Colorado State University (MS, PhD)
- Awards: Air Medal
- Space career

NASA astronaut
- Time in space: 14d 1h 57m
- Selection: NASA Group 8 (1978)
- Total EVAs: 4
- Total EVA time: 21h 57m
- Missions: STS-41-C; STS-51-I; STS-61-G (not flown)
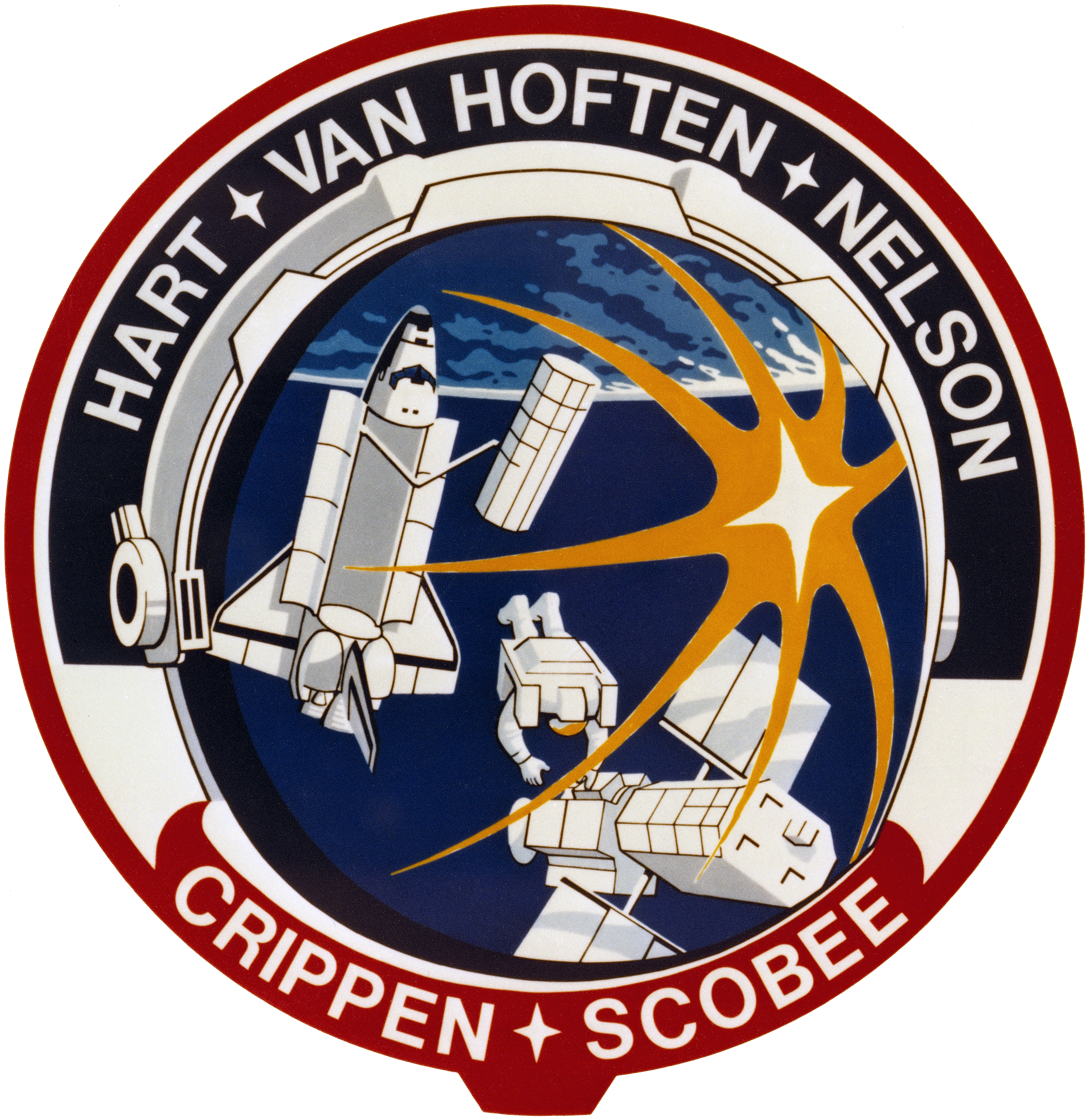
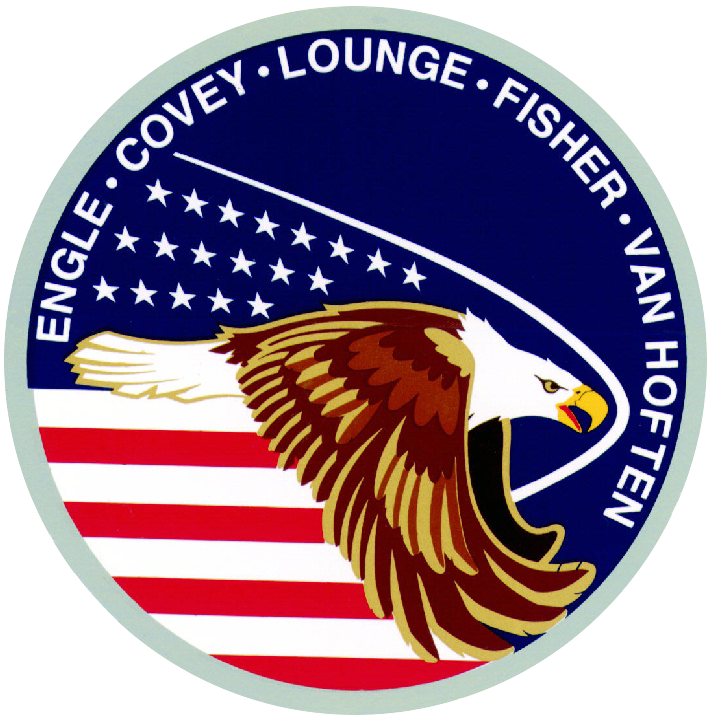
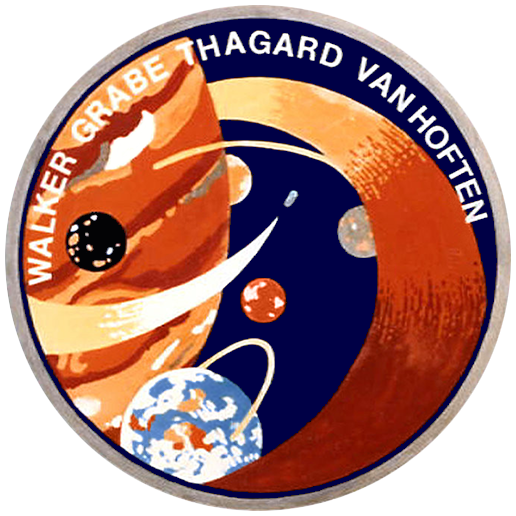
- Mission insignia
- Retired: August 1, 1986

James Dougal Adrianus "Ox" van Hoften (born June 11, 1944) is an American civil and hydraulic engineer, retired U.S. Navy officer and aviator, and a former astronaut for NASA.

== Personal data ==
Van Hoften was born June 11, 1944, in Fresno, California. He was active in the Boy Scouts of America where he achieved its second-highest rank, Life Scout. He considers Burlingame, California, to be his hometown. He is of Dutch descent. Van Hoften is married to the former Vallarie Davis of Pasadena, with three children. He enjoys skiing, playing handball and racquetball, and jogging. In college, he was a member of the Alpha Sigma chapter of Pi Kappa Alpha.

== Education ==
Graduated from Mills High School, Millbrae, California, in 1962; received a Bachelor of Science degree in civil engineering from the University of California, Berkeley in 1966; a Master of Science and a Doctor of Philosophy degree in hydraulic engineering from Colorado State University in 1968 and 1976, respectively.

== Flight experience ==
From 1969 to 1974, Van Hoften was a pilot in the United States Navy. He received flight training at Pensacola, Florida, and completed jet pilot training at Beeville, Texas, in November 1970. He was then assigned to the Naval Air Station, Miramar, California, to fly F-4 Phantoms, and subsequently to VF-121 Replacement Air Group. As a pilot with VF-154 assigned to the aircraft carrier USS Ranger in 1972, Van Hoften participated in two cruises to Southeast Asia where he flew approximately 60 combat missions during the Vietnam War. He resumed his academic studies in 1974, and completed a dissertation on the interaction of waves and turbulent channel flow for his doctorate.

In September 1976, he accepted an assistant professorship of Civil Engineering at the University of Houston, and until his selection as an astronaut candidate, taught fluid mechanics and conducted research on biomedical fluid flows concerning flows in artificial internal organs and valves. Dr. Van Hoften has published a number of papers on turbulence, waves, and cardiovascular flows. From 1977 until 1980 he flew F-4N's with Naval Reserve Fighter Squadron 201 at NAS Dallas and then three years as a member of the Texas Air National Guard with the 147th Fighter Interceptor Group at Ellington Field as a pilot in the F-4C.

He has logged 3,300 hours flying time, the majority in jet aircraft.

== NASA career ==
Dr. Van Hoften was selected as an astronaut candidate by NASA in January 1978. He completed a 1-year training and evaluation period in August 1979.

From 1979 through the first flight, STS-1, Van Hoften supported the Space Shuttle entry and on-orbit guidance, navigation and flight control testing at the Flight Systems Laboratory at Downey, California. Subsequently, he was lead of the Astronaut Support Team at Kennedy Space Center, Florida, responsible for the Space Shuttle turn-around testing and flight preparations. He served as a mission specialist on STS-41-C in 1984, and STS-51-I in 1985. Dr. Van Hoften has logged a total 338 hours in space, including 22 hours of EVA flight time.

=== Spaceflight experience ===
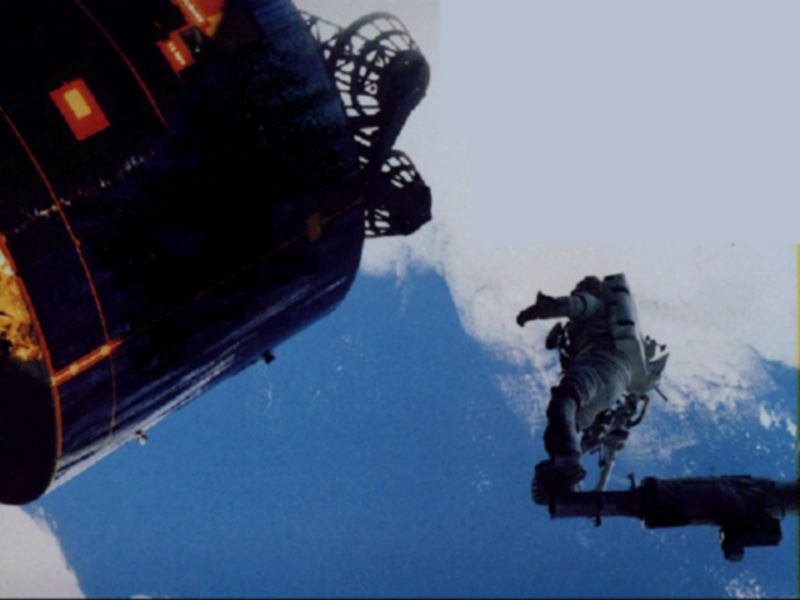
Van Hoften's EVA during STS-51-I mission

STS-41-C: Challenger (April 6–13, 1984) was launched from the Kennedy Space Center, Florida, and returned to land at Edwards Air Force Base, California. During the 7-day mission the crew successfully deployed the Long Duration Exposure Facility (LDEF); retrieved the ailing Solar Maximum Mission satellite, repaired it on board the orbiting Challenger and replaced it in orbit, using the robot arm called the Remote Manipulator System (RMS). The mission also included flight testing of Manned Maneuvering Units (MMU's) in two extra-vehicular activities (EVA's); operation of the Cinema 360 and IMAX Camera Systems, as well as a Bee Hive Honeycomb Structures student experiment. The mission was accomplished in 107 Earth orbits in 167 hours, 40 minutes, 7 seconds.

STS-51-I: Discovery (August 27 to September 3, 1985) launched from the Kennedy Space Center, Florida, and returned to land at Edwards Air Force Base, California. During this mission, the crew successfully deployed three communications satellites, the Navy's Syncom IV-4, Australian AUSSAT, and American Satellite Company's ASC-1. The crew also performed the successful salvage of the ailing Navy Syncom IV-3 satellite. These tasks included two extravehicular activities (EVA's) in which Dr. Van Hoften attached to the Remote Manipulator System (RMS) performed the first manual grapple and manual deployment of a satellite in orbit. The mission also included the Physical Vapor Transport of Organic Solids (PVTOS), the second material processing experiment to be flown aboard a Shuttle for 3M. The mission was accomplished in 112 orbits of the Earth in 171 hours, 17 minutes, 42 seconds.

== Post-NASA career ==
Dr. Van Hoften is a former senior Vice President and partner of the Bechtel Corporation. He was managing director of the global airport design and construction business and was responsible for airport developments in the Middle East, Japan, and North and South America. In the early 1990s, he was the program manager of the $23 billion Hong Kong Airport Core Programme including the new Hong Kong Airport. He later acted as Director of Projects for the UK National Air Traffic Services. In 2009 he was appointed a non-executive director of Gatwick Airport.

== Organizations ==
Member of the American Institute of Aeronautics and Astronautics (AIAA), Sigma Xi, Chi Epsilon, and Pi Kappa Alpha.

== Awards and honors ==
- Meritorious Service Medal
- Navy Air Medals, twice
- National Defense Service Medal
- Vietnam Service Medal
- NASA Space Flight Medals, twice

== Physical description ==
- Weight: 200 lb (91 kg)
- Height: 6 ft 4 in (1.93 m)
- Hair: Brown
- Eyes: Hazel

== See also ==
- Bechtel Corporation
- List of spaceflight records
