= Albanians in Slovenia =

Albanians in Slovenia Shqiptarët në Slloveni
Total population
- ca. 10,000

Regions with significant populations
- Ljubljana · Maribor · Celje

Languages
- Albanian, Slovene

Religion
- Islam, Christianity

The Albanians in Slovenia constitute an ethnic minority of the country as immigrants. Most Albanians in Slovenia originally come from Kosovo, North Macedonia, Montenegro and Albania.

== History ==
The Bruti were an Albanian noble family from Ulcinj who migrated to Koper in the second half of the 16th century, specifically 1571, were the first Albanians to migrate to what is known as modern day Slovenia, a relocation from pressure of the Turks. A key turning point was a Doge's decree of 3 September 1575, which admitted the Bruti brothers & their legitimate male descendants to the nobility of Koper, even though the city's Grand Council initially protested.

After settling in Koper, the family became part of the city's elite through public office, clergy, & marriage. Giacomo Bruti later served as an ambassador in Venice and as Captain of the Slavs, Bartolomeo Bruti trained as an interpreter in Istanbul, then worked in Spanish service and later entered Moldavian politics, and Agostino Bruti became Bishop of Koper in 1733. The family's status was also visible in the Bruti Palace, which later became the city library.

At the time of Yugoslavia, Albanians migrated to Slovenia for economic and political reasons, especially after 1945. Albanian migrants were mainly from the Republic of Macedonia, Kosovo and Montenegro.

Even in the republic of Slovenia, as in most countries, we have an early exile of Albanians, especially from the areas of Kosovo. Here the Albanians are present almost immediately, sometime after the Second World War, namely from the time of the creation of the Yugoslav state, in which the state was part of a constituent unit, Slovenia as a republic and the state of Kosovo as an autonomous province.

Since then, the difficult economic situation and later, even politics, forced Albanians to seek and find better living conditions in this country, which from the outset was distinguished by the standard of living compared to other units of the former Yugoslav federation.

== Demographics ==
Historical population of Albanians in Slovenia
Year	Pop.	±% p.a.
1953	169	—
1961	282	+6.61%
1971	1,266	+16.20%
1981	1,933	+4.32%
1991	3,534	+6.22%
2002	6,186	+5.22%
2016	10,506	+3.86%

At the beginning, we had a small number of wing workers in Slovenia, but the worse worsening of the political situation in Kosovo caused the number of Albanians there to grow, whereas today, according to statistical data, in Slovene the number of Albanians is 6.228 which was issued on the basis of 0.31% of Albanians from the total number of inhabitants in Slovenia. Today there are around 10,000 Albanians living in Slovenia.

== Notable people ==
=== Sports ===
- Erjon Kastrati - Slovene-Albanian professional basketball player
- Rok Stipčević - Basketball player
- Gëzim Morina - Slovene-Albanian professional basketball player who plays for Primorska of the Telemach League
- Liridon Osmanaj - Slovenian footballer
- Gzim Rexhaj - Slovenian footballer
- Albin Tahiri - Kosovo Albanian World Cup alpine ski racer
- Leutrim Osaj - Slovenian footballer
- Egzon Kryeziu - Slovenian footballer
- Altin Kryeziu - Slovenian footballer
- Luana Zajmi - Slovenian-Albanian footballer
- Izabela Križaj - Slovenian footballer

== See also ==
- Albania–Slovenia relations
- Albanian diaspora
- Ethnic groups in Slovenia
