= Albanian diaspora =

People of Albanian descent living outside Albania

The Albanian diaspora (Albanian: Mërgata Shqiptare or Diaspora Shqiptare) are the ethnic Albanians and their descendants living outside of Albania, Kosovo, southeastern Montenegro, western North Macedonia, southeastern Serbia, northwestern Greece and Southern Italy.

The largest communities of the Albanian diaspora are particularly found in Italy, Argentina, Greece, Romania, Croatia, Turkey, Scandinavia, Germany, Switzerland and the United States. Other important and increasing communities are located in Australia, Brazil, Canada, France, Belgium, New Zealand, and the United Kingdom. The Albanian diaspora is large and continues to grow, with Albanians now present in significant numbers in numerous countries.

The phenomenon of migration from Albania is recorded since the early Middle Ages, when numerous Albanians immigrated to southern Italy and Greece to escape various socio-political difficulties and the Ottoman conquest. The modern Albanian diaspora has been largely formed since 1991, following the end of communism in Albania. Over 800,000 Albanians have left the country, mostly settling in Greece and Italy either permanently or as temporary workforce.

In regard to the Kosovo-Albanian diaspora, more than one million Albanians have left Kosovo since the late 1980s permanently, excluding those fleeing the Kosovo War, who have subsequently returned. Further, important destinations for emigrating Albanians from Kosovo have been mostly Switzerland, Austria, Germany and the Nordic countries.

The Albanian diaspora constitutes one of Europe's largest contemporary diasporas, with emigration constantly growing. Those of Albanian descent may choose to self-identify as Albanian, adopt hybrid identities or opt to not identify with their Albanian ancestry. Many contemporary Albanians who belong to the diaspora opt to declare their ethnicity as their nationality, as seen in census underreporting of ethnic Albanians primarily in North America, South America and Oceania. Due to the Albanian diaspora being large, old and complex, many Albanians abroad have intermarried, assimilated or formed transnational identities and communities. These reasons, among others, serve as obstacles to identifying the true extent of the Albanian diaspora and population totals.

== History ==
Distribution of ethnic Albanians in the world. Albania and Kosovo + 1,000,000 + 100,000 + 10,000 + 1,000

In Albania, emigration dates back to the 15th century, when many Albanians emigrated to Calabria in Southern Italy and Greece after the defeat of the country by Ottoman forces. Other popular destinations were Turkey, Bulgaria, and later the United States and South America. Following the communist take over after World War II, emigration was outlawed and violations severely punished. At the same time, Albanian birth rates in both Albania and Kosovo were among the highest in Europe (see Demographics of Albania and Kosovo), and the economies were among the weakest (especially under the Hoxha regime), leading to a huge young population in both regions and a consequently huge demand for emigration once the borders were opened in the 1990s. Two major emigration waves in the 1990s were:

- The Albanian population in Turkey was created in three large waves of emigration in different period times. The first one was the deportation of Albanians from Kosovo in 1910, when 120,000 Albanians were deported to Turkey by the Serbian authority. The second one was in 1926-1938, when about 400,000 emigrated to Turkey. The last one was after World War II, in 1953-1966, when nearly 400,000 were forced to emigrate to Turkey from Kosovo.
- Post-1990 wave after the collapse of communism in Albania in the form of break-ins at foreign embassies and departures by ship, esp. to Italy.
- Post-1997 wave following the 1997 unrest in Albania and the Kosovo War (1998–99).

The preference for Italy, Greece and Western European countries during the first waves of emigration has given way to Canada and the United States due to stricter European immigration laws.

The rate of emigration has gradually decreased during the later 2000s, with a sudden increase in 2014-15.

== Impact ==
The willingness of Albanians to emigrate has had a cultural impact which has not affected their sense of national identity. Among ethnic Albanians in Kosovo, Montenegro, North Macedonia, and Greece, Albanian and old Turkish names still are quite common. In Albania proper, religious names were not allowed during communism, and were barely given since the fall of the Communist dictatorship and the opening of the borders. Instead, Italian and English or Christian names, became quite common. Many Albanian migrants also convert from Islam to Christianity.

In Albania, it is also estimated that emigrant remittances account for 18% of GDP or $530 million annually, though declining in the late 2000s. Those who have come back have opened micro-enterprises, while the proximity of Greece and Italy to Albania, where more than half of immigrants are located has contributed to continuous labor mobility. Recently, during the Greek financial crisis, many Albanian emigrants have returned either temporarily or permanently to Albania. The mass emigration of the 1990s to early 2000s has resulted in massive brain drain from Albania. In the period 1990–2003, an estimated 45% of Albania's academics emigrated, as did more than 65% of the scholars who received PhDs in the West in the period 1980–1990. In 2006, a "brain gain" program compiled by Albanian authorities and the UNDP was put into action to encourage the skilled diaspora to contribute to the country's development, though its success remains to be seen.

On 26 November 2019, an earthquake struck Albania. Around the world, the Albanian diaspora (from Albania and other parts of the Balkans) expressed its solidarity and held multiple fundraisers to send money to Albania and assist people impacted by the earthquake, raising millions. Global pop stars with an Albanian background also appealed to fans for support and donations to the relief effort.

Members of the Albanian diaspora created the first IPTV platform in the US and later in Europe, designed to deliver their national video content to Albanians living in the US and other countries.

== Europe ==
=== Bulgaria ===
In 1636, the Mandritsa, a typical village in Bulgaria, was found by Eastern Orthodox Albanian dairymen who supplied the Ottoman Army. They were allowed to pick a tract of land and were freed from taxes. In the 2001 census of Bulgaria, it was estimated that 278 Albanians live in the country.

=== Greece ===
After the fall of communism throughout Eastern Europe in the late 1980s and early 1990s, a large number of economic refugees and immigrants from Greece's neighbouring countries, Albania, Bulgaria, North Macedonia, Romania, as well as from more distant countries such as Russia, Ukraine, Armenia and Georgia, arrived in Greece, mostly as illegal immigrants, to seek employment. The vast majority of the Albanians in Greece is estimated to be between 65–70% of the total number of immigrants in the country. According to the 2001 census, there are 443,550 holders of Albanian citizenship in Greece, with the total of Albanian immigrants in Greece numbering well over 650,000.

Albanians in Greece are by far the most integrated, legal and settled community.

=== Italy ===
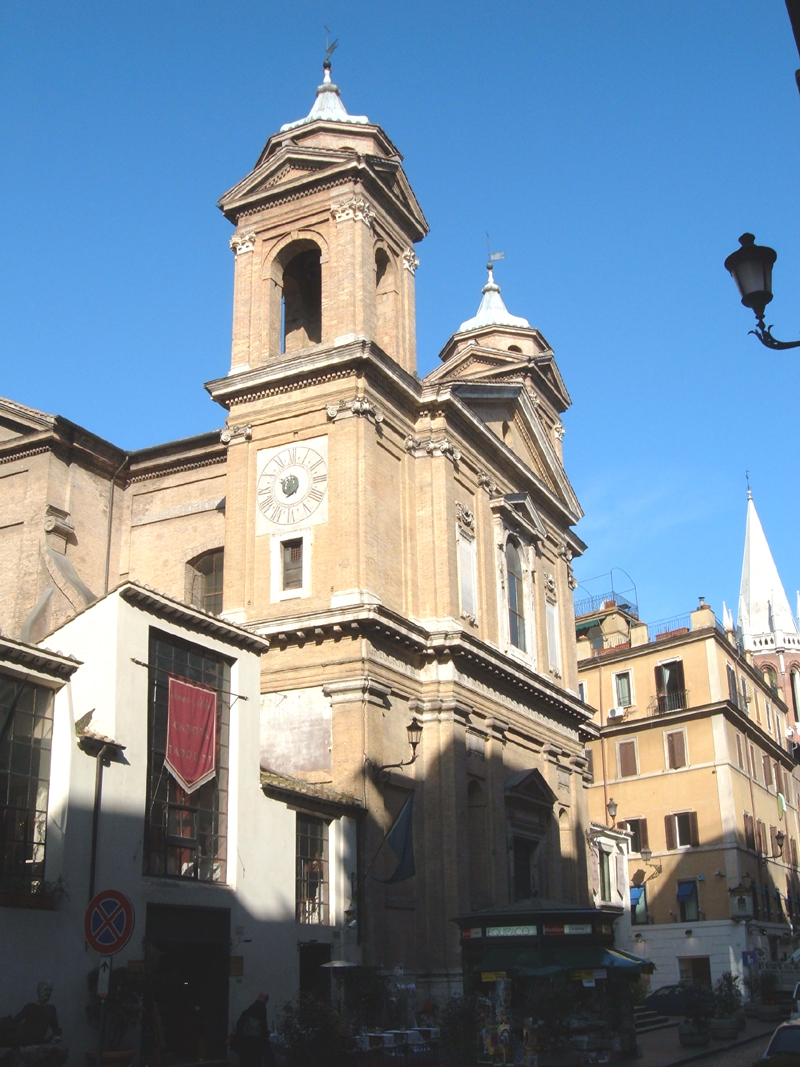
Church of Sant'Atanasio in Rome (1583), established for the training of the Italian-Albanian clergy of Greek rite

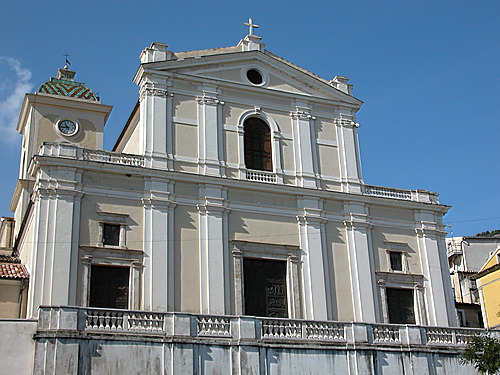
The Cathedral of Lungro in an Arbëreshë town in Calabria

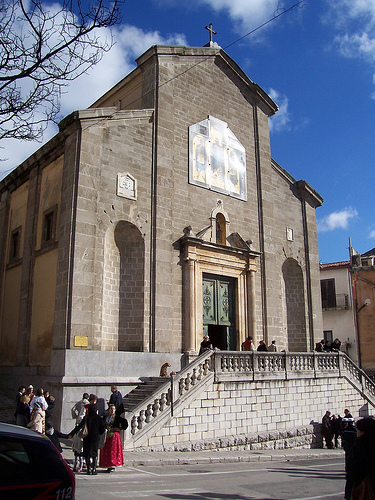
The Piana degli Albanesi Cathedral in an Arbëreshë town in Sicily

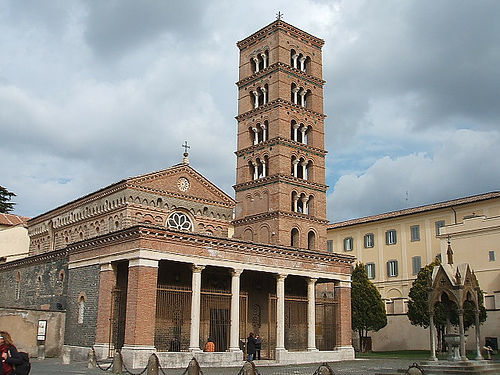
The Abbacy of Grottaferrata, with Basilian monks from the Italo-Albanian communities, in Rome

The Albani were an aristocratic Roman family, members of which attained the highest dignities in the Roman Catholic Church, one, Clement XI, having been Pope. They were ethnic Albanians who originally moved to Urbino from the region of Malësi e Madhe in Albania. and had been soldiers of Skanderbeg against the Ottoman Empire. Though eventually assimilated in their Italian environment, Clement XI's Albanian antecedents were evident in his having commissioned, during his reign as a Pope, the famous Illyricum Sacrum. Today it is one of the main sources of the field of Albanology, with over 5000 pages divided in several volumes written by Daniele Farlati and Dom. Coletti.

There is an Albanian community in southern Italy, known as Arbëreshë, who had settled in the country in the 15th and the 16th century, displaced by the changes brought about by the expansion of the Ottoman Empire. Some managed to escape and were offered refuge from the repression by the Kingdom of Naples and Kingdom of Sicily (both under Aragonese rule), where the Arbëreshë were given their own villages and protected. The Arbëreshë were estimated as numbering 250 000 in 1976. Italian statistics place them much lower at 100,000.

After the breakdown of the communist regime in Albania in 1990, Italy had been the main immigration target for Albanians leaving their country.

This was because Italy had been a symbol of the West for many Albanians during the communist period, because of its geographic proximity. Italy reacted to the migration pressure by introducing the "Martelli" law, stipulating that any immigrant who could prove that he or she had come into the country before the end of 1989 be granted a two-year residency permit. From March 1997, Italy instituted a strict patrol of the Adriatic in an attempt to curb Albanian immigration. As a result, many Albanian immigrants in Italy do not have a legal status. Out of an estimated 450,000 Albanian immigrants in Italy in 1998, only some 82,000 were registered with authorities. In total there are 800,000 Albanians in Italy.

The Italian Government has housed significant numbers of Albanians from Kosovo in the Arbëresh settlements, most notably in the zone of Lungro in Calabria and Piana degli Albanesi in Sicily.

=== Turkey ===
Turkey has about six million citizens of full or partial Albanian descent, and most still feel a connection to Albania. There is also a Turkish minority in Kosovo.

Albania was the last nation in southeastern Europe to claim independence from the Ottoman Empire, on 28 November 1912.

Many Albanians emigrated to Turkey between 1950 and 1970. In that period, Islam in Yugoslavia was repressed, and both Albanians and Muslim Slavs were encouraged to declare themselves Turkish and emigrate to Turkey. In the 1990s, Turkey received a wave of Kosovar refugees, fleeing from conflict. Today, the number of ethnic Albanians Turkey has about 5 million citizens of full or partial Albanian descent

=== Germany ===
There are an estimated 300,000 Albanians living in Germany. They mostly migrated to Germany from Kosovo during the 1990s.

=== Switzerland ===
There are an estimated 250,000 ethnic Albanians in Switzerland, most of them from Kosovo, a sizeable minority arriving from North Macedonia. Albanians have migrated to Switzerland since the 1960s, but bulk of immigration took place during the 1990s, especially during 1998–1999. They account for about 2% of total Swiss population, making them the third largest immigrant community in Switzerland, after the Italian and German ones. The Albanian language is the second largest immigrant language spoken in Switzerland, following Serbo-Croatian. About 40,000 have been naturalized as Swiss citizens, while an estimated 150,000 remain registered as nationals of either Serbia and Montenegro (carrying passports issued during the existence of that country, 1992–2006), the Republic of Kosovo (34,000 Kosovar passports registered with the Swiss authority by August 2010), North Macedonia, or Albania.

=== United Kingdom ===
The history of Albanians in Britain began in the 16th century with the arrival of mercenary stratioti cavalry who served the English king in his wars against the Kingdom of Scotland.

The 2021 UK Census recorded 67,957 people born in Albania resident in England, with 715 people in Wales, and 142 people in Northern Ireland. The number of residents of England born in Kosovo was 30,427, with 90 recorded in Wales and 60 in Northern Ireland.

Albania has one embassy in the UK, located in London.

=== Portugal ===
Neither Albania nor Portugal have an embassy in their respective countries. Albania has 3 honorary consulates in Porto, Funchal (Madeira island) and Lisbon, while Portugal has an honorary consulate in Tirana. The history of diplomatic relations of Albania and Portugal dates back to 1922, when Portugal recognized Albania's independence on May 25, 1922. Many Portuguese enterprises are active in Albania. As of 2022 there are an estimated 160 people of recent Albanian immigrant background living in Portugal, the majority being foreign nationals. They are highly integrated and around 70 have acquired Portuguese citizenship in 2008-2021. The most famous Portuguese-Albanian is perhaps former footballer Eduard Abazaj. Albanians mostly migrated to Portugal in recent years and they mainly live in Lisbon. During the last years there have been some problems dealing with drug trafficking, illegal migration (more than 500 people travelling with forged documents detected since 2010), Albanian mafia and robberies. Despite these problems, the vast majority of the Albanians residing in Portugal is well integrated. Moreover, many of those involved in crime aren't even Portuguese residents.

== Americas ==
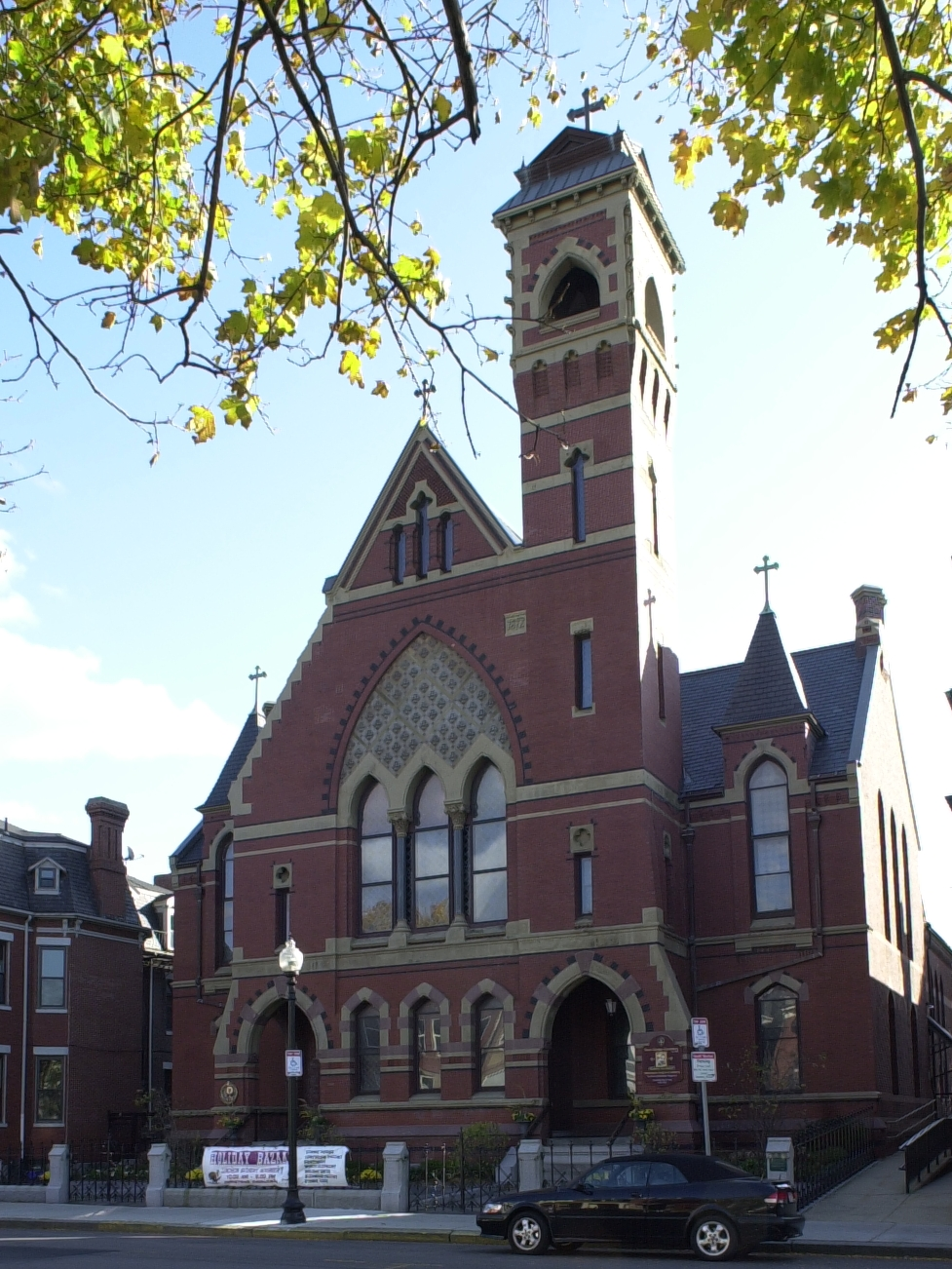
The Albanian Orthodox cathedral of St. George in South Boston, MA

=== Canada ===
As defined by the Statistics Canada in 2011, there were 28,270 Canadians claiming an Albanian ancestry. There have been Albanian settlers in Canada since at least the early 20th century, following internal pre-war revolutionary upheavals. The majority of the Albanian immigrants settled in either Montreal or Toronto but also in Calgary and Peterborough.

After the inter-ethnic conflict between ethnic Albanians in Kosovo and Serbian military and police forces, many Albanians left Kosovo as refugees. Some have come to Canada, and in 1999 the Canadian government created a program to offer safe haven to 7000 Kosovar Albanian refugees. They continue to appreciate their ethnic heritage and their Albanian national history, even though their ancestors may have left Albania several decades ago. Those Albanians from Albania proper are active in their business and social organisations.

=== United States ===
Albanians began to settle in the USA in the late 19th-20th centuries from Southern Albania, Greece, Turkey, Southern Italy and Kosovo, and in the 1990s from Albania, Montenegro, North Macedonia, and refugees of war. The largest Albanian American (incl. Kosovar Albanian) populations are in New York City, Boston, Detroit, Jacksonville, and Chicago. Another Albanian American community in Southern California such as the Los Angeles area. The Inland Empire (Riverside/San Bernardino) area of California includes Kosovars who entered the United States at the March Joint Air Reserve Base in Riverside. The Albanian-American population is currently 224,000 or 0.04% of the US population.

== Oceania ==
=== Australia ===
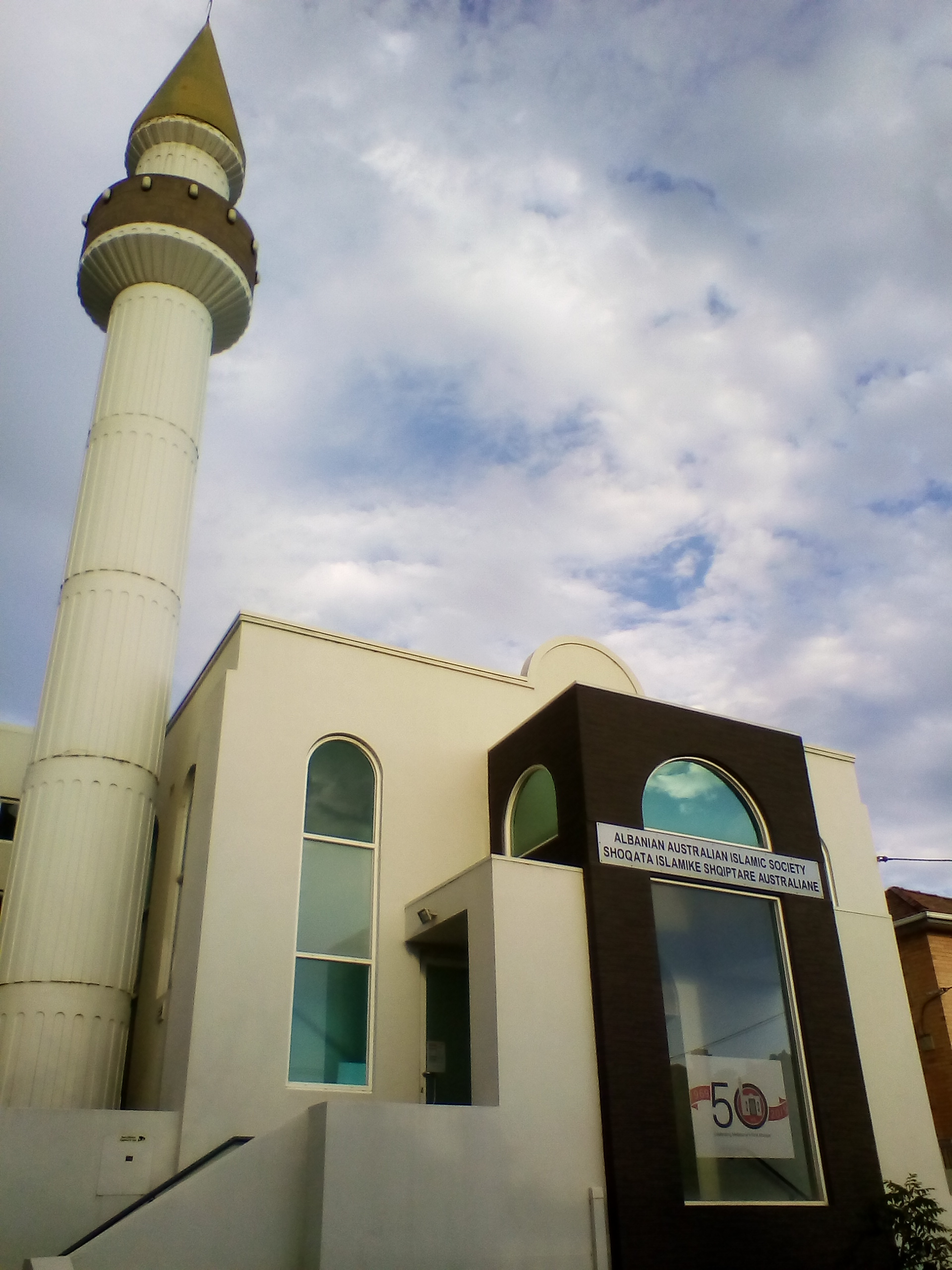
Melbourne's first mosque, built by the Albanian community

The 2021 Australian census counted 5,109 people born in Albania or Kosovo and 19,686 claimed Albanian ancestry, either alone or with another ancestry. Albanians were the first significant Muslim group to migrate to Australia under the White Australia policy, an immigration policy that allowed white European migrants. Albanians migrated to Australia from southern Albania during the interwar period (early 1920s-late 1930s) mainly from Korçë and its surrounding rural areas. They worked in hard labour jobs and farming, settled in northern Western Australia, Queensland and later Shepparton in Victoria were a successful community was established. Post-war, refugees mainly from Albania and a few from southern Yugoslavia arrived. In the 1960s-1970s, Albanians from southwestern Yugoslavia (modern North Macedonia) arrived and settled in Melbourne's working class and manufacturing suburbs, mainly in Dandenong and others in the western and northern suburbs. During the aftermath of the Kosovo war (1999), some Kosovo Albanian refugees on temporary asylum were officially allowed to permanently remain in Australia. In the early twenty first century, Dandenong and Shepparton in Victoria are places with the highest concentrations of Albanians. There are also Albanian communities in Western Australia, South Australia, Queensland, New South Wales and the Northern Territory.

=== New Zealand ===
Albanian migration to New Zealand occurred mid twentieth century following the Second World War. A small group of Albanian refugees originating mainly from Albania and the rest from Yugoslavian Kosovo and Macedonia settled in Auckland. During the Kosovo crisis (1999), up to 400 Kosovo Albanian refugees settled in New Zealand. In the twenty first century, Albanian New Zealanders number 400-500 people and are mainly concentrated in Auckland.

== Table ==
Country	Albanian population	Percentage	Source
Albania	2 402 113 (2023 census)	96.44%	
Kosovo^{[a]}	1,454,963 (2024 census, nationality)	91.76%	Kosovo Albanians
North Macedonia	446,245 (2021 census)	24.3%	Albanians in North Macedonia
Greece	480,824 (2011 census, Albanian citizenship, excludes naturalised citizens)	4.45%	Albanians in Greece
Montenegro	30,439 (2011 census)	4.91%	Albanians in Montenegro
Serbia	61,687 (2022 census)	0.08%	Albanians in Serbia
—	5,492,542	—	—
Other countries
Turkey	300,000 to 3 million Turks are of Albanian origin (2007)		Albanians in Turkey
Italy	402,546 (2015 statistics, Albanian citizenship) to 700,000 Albanian descents from south Albania [with Arbereshe, dual citizens and undocumented]	0.83%	Albanians in Italy
Germany	300,000 (2010)		Albanians in Germany
Switzerland	292,717 (2022 Statistics)	3.39%	Albanians in Switzerland
United States	222,964 (2023 5-Year-Estimates ACS)	0.07%	Albanian Americans
United Kingdom	68,672 (2021 census)	0.11%	Albanians in the United Kingdom
Canada	41,620 (2021 Census)	0.11%	Albanian Canadians
Argentina	40,000		Albanians in Argentina
Austria	28,212 (2001 census)	0.35%	Albanians in Austria
France	20,531 (2011 census)	0.03%	Albanians in France
Australia	19,686 (2021 census)	0.08%	Albanian Australians
Finland	19,600 (2025 statistics, mother tongue)	0.35%	Albanians in Finland
Croatia	17,531 (2011 census)	0.41%	Albanians of Croatia
Syria	5,000 to 10,000		Albanians in Syria
Belgium	7,183 (2010 statistics, Albanian/Kosovar citizenship)	0.07%	Albanians in Belgium
Slovenia	6,186 (2002 census)	0.31%	Albanians in Slovenia
Slovakia	5,851 (2001)		Albanians in Slovakia
Sweden	5,439 (2013 statistics, Albanian/Kosovar citizenship)	0.06%	
Denmark	3,596 (2017 statistics, Albanian/Kosovar citizenship)	0.06%	
Ukraine	3,308 (2001 census)	0.01%	Albanians in Ukraine
Bosnia and Herzegovina	2,569 (2013 census)	0.73%	Albanians in Bosnia and Herzegovina
Luxembourg	2,144 (2016 statistics, Albanian/Kosovar citizenship)	0.37%	
Ireland	2,133 (2011 census, mother tongue)	0.04%	
Spain	1,787		
Netherlands	1,638 (2013 statistics, Albanian/Kosovar citizenship)	0.01%	Albanians in the Netherlands
Norway	19,353 (2020 statistics, Albanian/Kosovar citizenship)	0.36%	Albanians in Norway
Czech Republic	673 (2011 census)	0.01%	
Hungary	591 (2011 census)	0.01%	Albanians in Hungary
Romania	520 (2002 census)	0%	Albanians in Romania
Poland	430 (2011 census)	0%	
Bulgaria	220 (2011 census)	0%	Albanians in Bulgaria
New Zealand	246 (2013 census)	0.01%	Albanian New Zealanders
Portugal	91 (foreign citizens only, 2022)	0%	
Moldova	87 (2014 census)	0%	
Latvia	15 (2019 statistics)	0%	
Lithuania	14 (2011 census)	0%	
Uzbekistan	16 (1989 census)	0%	
Estonia	12 (2011 census)	0%	
Iceland	12 (2011 census, Albanian citizenship)	0%	
Turkmenistan	6 (1995 census)	0%	
Belarus	3 (2009 census)	0%	
Faroe Islands	1 (2011 census, mother tongue)	0%	
—	1,507,694 to 4,710,211	—	—

== Return migration ==
Emigration has been one of the main causes that has driven the decline of the number of Albanian population during 2002-2011. The phenomenon of migration in Albania Immigration has been common. In most cases it has been taken by males. Gender difference in the last census period (2001-2011) is not that pronounced. According to INSTAT during this period about 481.000 Albanians left and 243,000 of them were male. According to the Organisation for Economic Cooperation and Developing countries most preferred destination for emigrants were Italy and Greece, followed by United States (US), United Kingdom (UK), and Germany. Italy is the country of destination preferred by 47 percent of immigrants, followed by Greece with 43 percent of emigrants, and the United States (US) coming up as a third destination.

Regarding the return, data Population and Housing Census 2011 show that about 139,827 Albanians were returned to Albania in the period 2001-2011, mostly male. Returnees are relatively young and working age. Employment and family reasons dominate among the reasons to return. In this sense, the return migration captured in the census is a snapshot of continuous circular migration. The National Research survey demonstrates that a total of 133,544 Albanian immigrants aged 18 years and above are turning in Albania in 2009-2013, of which 98,414 men and 35,130 women. This is a big difference report of returnees by sex, where men are over represented compared with women, 73.7% and 26.3% respectively. Since 2009 there has been a growing trend of returns, while the majority of the returns occurred in 2012 and 2013 (53.4 percent). Returns, dominated voluntary returns (94 percent) occurred in Greece, 70.8 percent to 23.7 percent followed by Italy and other countries like the UK, Germany, etc. Therefore, it can be argued that returns in Albania are mainly a consequence of the 2008 financial crisis that hit the market. The survey findings show that the main reasons for emigration from Albania have been unemployment in the country and opportunities for better employment abroad along with opportunities for higher incomes. No significant gender difference in immigration is a reason, besides family reunion that seems to have been the main reason for migration. On return, the main reasons include loss of employment in the country immigration, the longing for family and country, as well as problems faced by the family in Albania. Other reasons for return include better employment opportunities in Albania, investment plans or health problems.

== Notable people ==
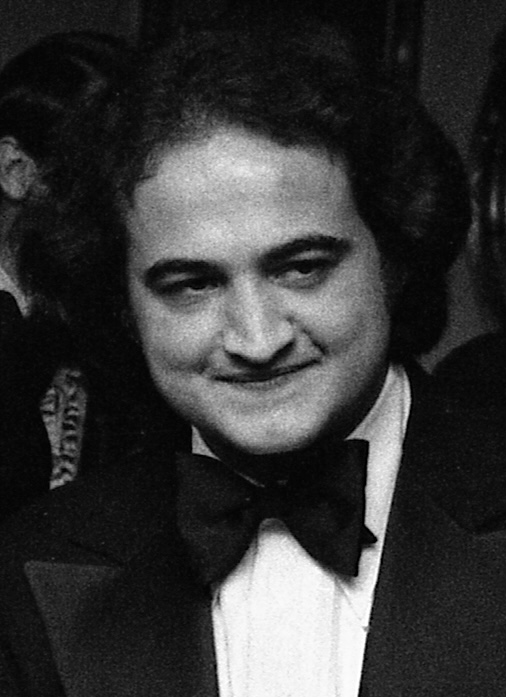
John Belushi

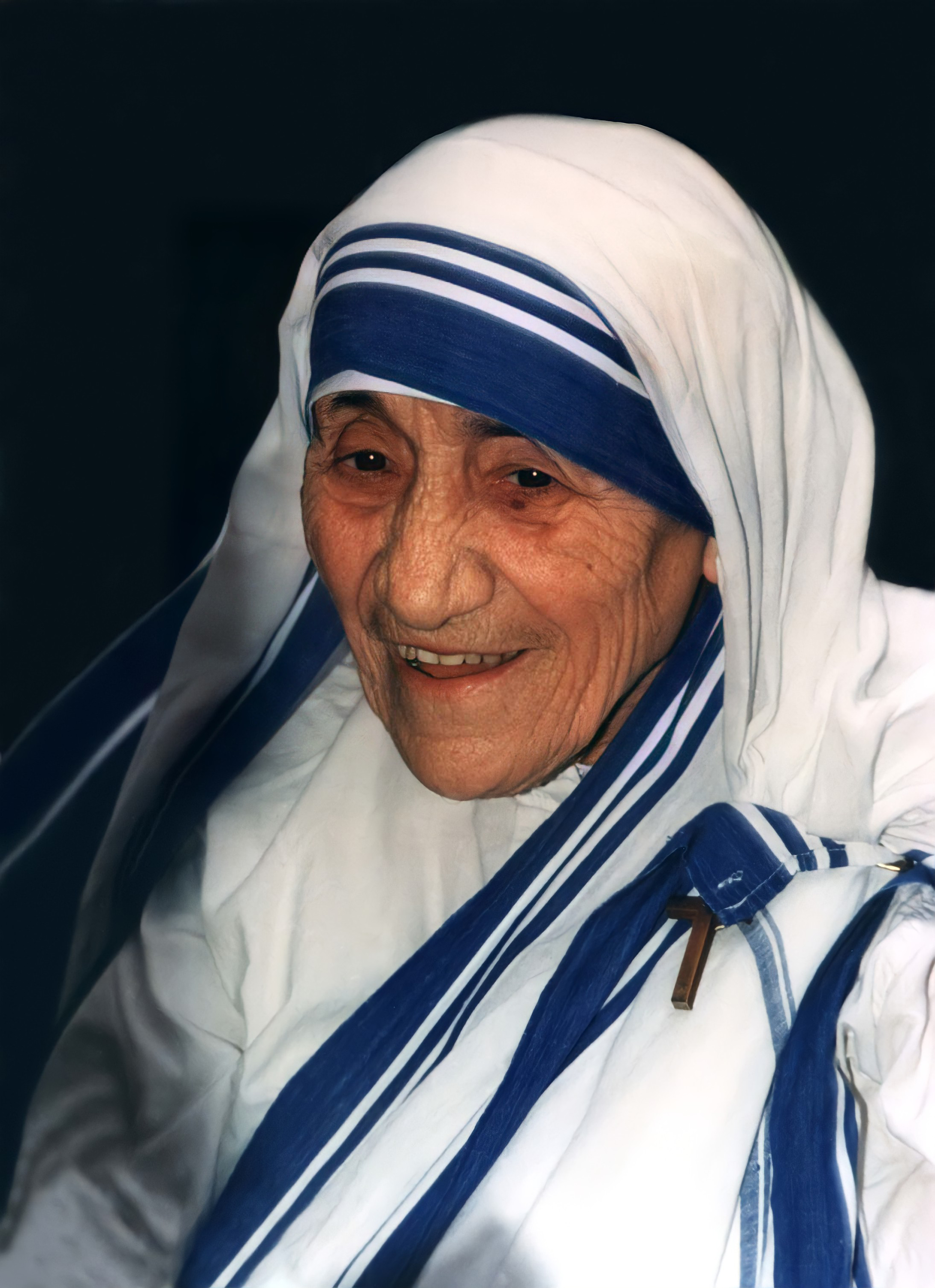
Mother Teresa

- Sedefkar Mehmed Agha, architect of the Sultan Ahmed Mosque (the "Blue Mosque") in Istanbul
- Action Bronson, Albanian-American rapper
- Fatmire Bajramaj, female football player. She moved to 1. FFC Frankfurt for the 2011–12 season: the transfer is the most expensive in women's Bundesliga history.
- Giorgio Basta, Italian general of Arbëreshë descent, employed by the Holy Roman Emperor Rudolf II to command Habsburg forces in the Long War of 1591–1606 and later to administer Transylvania as an Imperial vassal to restore Catholicism as a predominant religion in Transylvania
- James Belushi, Albanian-American Hollywood actor
- John Belushi, Albanian-American Hollywood actor
- Mother Teresa (born Agnes Gonxha Bojaxhiu), Catholic nun of Albanian ethnicity and Indian citizenship, who founded the Missionaries of Charity in Calcutta
- Lorik Cana, football player
- Adem Kerimofski, Australian musician of Albanian ancestry
- Granit Xhaka, footballer
- Francesco Crispi, Italian politician of Arbëreshë ancestry. He was instrumental in the unification of Italy and was its 17th and 20th Prime Minister from 1887 until 1891 and again from 1893 until 1896.
- Joe DioGuardi, Albanian-American certified public accountant and a Republican politician
- Tie Domi, Canadian professional ice hockey player. During a 16-year NHL career when he was known for his role as an enforcer, he played for the Toronto Maple Leafs, New York Rangers and Winnipeg Jets.
- Eliza Dushku, Albanian-American actress known for her television roles
- Lee Elia, Albanian-American former professional baseball player and manager in Major League Baseball
- Farouk I of Egypt (11 February 1920 – 18 March 1965), tenth ruler (Muhammad Ali Dynasty) and penultimate King of Egypt and Sudan, 1936. He was of Albanian, Egyptian and Turkish descent.
- Mit'hat Frashëri, diplomat, writer and politician. Son of Abdyl Frashëri, one of the most important activists of the Albanian National Awakening. In 1908 he participated in the Congress of Monastir.
- Mark Gjonaj, United States politician in the New York State Assembly
- Antonio Gramsci, Arbëreshë writer, politician, political theorist, linguist and philosopher
- William G. Gregory, first Albanian-American in space
- Kledi Kadiu, dancer and choreographer
- Luan Krasniqi, German boxer of Kosovo Albanian descent
- Mirela Manjani, retired Albanian javelin thrower that represented Greece
- Ava Max, Albanian-American singer
- Alexander Moissi, stage actor
- Ferid Murad, Albanian-American physician and pharmacologist, co-winner of the 1998 Nobel Prize in Physiology or Medicine
- Mateo Musacchio, Argentine footballer
- Muhammad Ali Pasha, regarded as the founder of modern Egypt, he was a commander of the Ottoman Sultan Mahmud II's army sent to drive Napoleon's forces out of Egypt: upon French withdrawal, became Governor of Egypt (1805), then Khedive (Viceroy) of Egypt and Sudan. He founded a dynasty.
- Anna Oxa, Albanian-Italian singer, born as Anna Hoxha.
- Regis Philbin, Albanian-American media personality, actor and singer, known for hosting talk and game shows from the 1960s to the present
- Rexhep Qosja, politician and literary critic
- Oruç Reis, also called Barbarossa or Redbeard, Turkish privateer and Ottoman Bey (Governor) of Algiers and Beylerbey (Chief Governor) of the West Mediterranean
- Girolamo de Rada (Arbëresh: Jeronim de Rada) (1814–1903), Italian writer of Italo-Albanian literature of Arbëreshë descent: he was the foremost figure of the Albanian National Awakening in 19th century Italy.
- Ernesto Sabato, Arbëreshë/ Argentine poet, physicist and writer
- Burim Myftiu, Albanian-American photographer, curator and visual artist
- Muhammad Nasiruddin al-Albani, Muslim cleric
- Rita Ora, Kosovar Albanian singer born in Prishtina, Kosovo (then Yugoslavia). Ora's family emigrated to London in 1991, when she was a year old.
- Dua Lipa, Kosovar Albanian singer
- Bebe Rexha, Albanian-American singer
- Eleni Foureira, singer who represented Cyprus at Eurovision Song Contest 2018
- Gjon Muharremaj, singer represented Switzerland at Eurovision Song Contest 2021.
- Erik Lloga, Albanian Australian community leader and sociologist
- Fadil Berisha, Albanian-American fashion photographer
- Mira Murati, Albanian CTO at Open AI
- Demna Gvasalia, Georgian fashion designer of partial Albanian descent
- Danny DeVito, American actor and filmmaker

== See also ==
- Lamerica - film on the 1991 Albanian Exodus to Italy
- Karaburun tragedy
- Tragedy of Otranto
