= Gzim =

Gzim is a masculine given name. Notable people with the name include:

- Gzim Istrefi (born 1991), Swedish football forward
- Gzim Rexhaj (born 1986), Slovene football forward
- Gzim Selmani (born 1994), Dutch boxer, wrestler, and mixed martial artist
