= Albanians in Finland =

Ethnic group in Finland

Albanians in Finland Shqiptarët në Finlandë
Total population
- 12,362

Regions with significant populations
- Helsinki, Vantaa

Languages
- Albanian, Finnish, Swedish

Related ethnic groups
- Albanian diaspora, Kosovo diaspora, Albanians in Sweden, Albanians in Norway

Albanians in Finland (Albanian: Shqiptarët në Finlandë; Finnish: albaanit Suomessa) are ethnic Albanians living in Finland, numbering at 12,362 people.

== Distribution ==
Municipality	Albanian citizens (2024)	Kosovo citizens (2024)	Combined (approx.)	% of total Albanian community
Helsinki	5,312	1,921	~7,233	29%
Vantaa	3,987	1,113	~5,100	20%
Espoo	2,645	955	~3,600	14%
Turku	2,112	888	~3,000	12%
Tampere	987	413	~1,400	6%
Lahti	712	288	~1,000	4%
Rest of Finland	~3,000	~1,700	~4,700	19%
Total	~18,755	~7,278	~26,033	100%
Sources: Statistics Finland, Population by citizenship and municipality 2024 (preliminary 31 Dec 2024 data); mother-tongue Albanian speakers used as additional proxy.

The oldest and still very active Albanian community outside the capital region is in Turku, where the Albanian Cultural Association "Bashkimi" was founded in 1998.

== See also ==
- List of Albanians in Scandinavia
