= Albanians in Slovakia =

Albanians in Slovakia Shqiptarët në Sllovaki Albánci na Slovensku
Total population
- 5,851

Regions with significant populations
- Bratislava

Languages
- Slovak, Albanian

Religion
- Islam, Christianity

Albanians in Slovakia (Albanian: Shqiptarët në Sllovaki, Slovak: Albánci na Slovensku) are a small ethnic minority in Slovakia, primarily consisting of recent economic migrants from Albania and Kosovo. According to the 2001 Population and Housing Census conducted by the Statistical Office of the Slovak Republic, 5,851 individuals declared Albanian nationality. Most are employed in construction, hospitality, and information technology sectors, benefiting from European Union labour mobility.

== History ==
The Albanian community in Slovakia has a relatively recent history, with roots tracing back to the late communist era. Initial Albanian migration to Czechoslovakia (which included present-day Slovakia until its dissolution in 1993) began in the 1980s, primarily involving hundreds of Albanians from Yugoslavia—mainly from Kosovo, Macedonia, and southern Serbia, who were attracted by Czechoslovakia's proximity to Western Europe (such as Germany and Austria), where many worked as guest laborers. These early migrants established small businesses, including coffee houses and ice cream parlors, particularly in Slovak urban areas. This first wave was modest and transient, often serving as a stepping stone to further westward migration.

=== 1990s ===
A second, more significant wave followed the break-up of Yugoslavia in the early 1990s and the ensuing Yugoslav Wars (1991–1999), during which a limited number of Kosovo Albanians sought refuge in Slovakia, though most Balkan refugees were directed to other European destinations like the Czech Republic or Western Europe. Post-communist economic instability in Albania after the fall of its regime in 1991, combined with the chaos of the Kosovo War (1998–1999), further drove migration. Slovakia's accession to the European Union in 2004 opened its labor markets, accelerating inflows of economic migrants from rural Albania and western Kosovo. These newcomers primarily filled roles in construction, manufacturing, and hospitality—sectors facing labour shortages

== Notable people ==
- Garip Saliji (sk), ice hockey player
- Samir Saliji (de), ice hockey player
- Filip Balaj, footballer
- Leona Novoberdaliu, Miss Slovakia 2020

== See also ==
- Albania-Slovakia relations
- Albanian diaspora
- Ethnic groups in Slovakia
