= List of Albanians in Scandinavia =

This is a list of notable people who are ethnically Albanian, currently residing in Scandinavia.

== Politics ==
- Arba Kokalari - Swedish politician for the Moderate Party
- Aida Birinxhiku - Swedish politician and member of the Riksdag

== Cinema ==
- Fortesa Hoti - Swedish actress
- René Redzepi - Danish chef and founder of the Michelin star restaurant Noma

== Arts and entertainment ==
- Dafina Zeqiri - Albanian-Swedish singer and songwriter
- Adrijana Krasniqi - Swedish singer, songwriter, and rapper
- Jimilian - Danish singer
- Misse Beqiri - Swedish model and actress
- Yllka Berisha - Albanian-Swedish model
- Kidda - Albanian-Swedish rapper and songwriter
- Elai - Swedish-Albanian rapper, singer and songwriter
- Erjona Ala - Fashion Model

== Science and academia ==
- Savo Gjirja - Albanian research engineer

== Sports ==
- Riza Durmisi - Danish professional footballer
- Kosovare Asllani - Swedish professional footballer
- Astrit Ajdarević - Swedish professional footballer
- Arbër Zeneli - Professional footballer who plays as a midfielder for French club Reims and the Kosovo national team
- Egzon Binaku - Albanian professional footballer
- Alfred Ajdarević - Albanian professional footballer
- Emir Bajrami - Swedish professional footballer
- Ilir Latifi - Swedish mixed martial artist
- Robert Gojani - Swedish professional footballer
- Labinot Harbuzi - Swedish professional footballer
- Bashkim Kadrii - Danish footballer
- Valon Berisha - Kosovar footballer
- Zymer Bytyqi - Norwegian footballer who plays as a winger for Viking
- Bersant Celina - professional footballer who plays as a midfielder for Welsh club Swansea City
- Flamur Kastrati - Kosovar footballer who plays as a forward for Eliteserien club Kristiansund
- Kamer Qaka - Albanian professional footballer
- Herolind Shala - professional footballer who plays as a midfielder for Norwegian club Start
- Bajram Ajeti - Norwegian footballer
- Fitim Azemi - Norwegian footballer
- Arian Kabashi - Swedish football player
- Albion Ademi - Finnish footballer
- Erton Fejzullahu - Swedish-Kosovar footballer
- Gentrit Citaku - Swedish professional footballer
- Petrit Zhubi - Swedish footballer
- Berat Sadik - Finnish footballer
- Mentor Zhubi - Swedish International Futsal player
- Denis Abdulahi - professional football player from Finland
- Erfan Zeneli - Finnish footballer
- Edis Tatli - Finnish professional boxer
- Bajram Fetai - Swedish player
- Ibrahim Drešević - Swedish footballer
- Perparim Hetemaj - Finnish professional footballer
- Mehmet Hetemaj - Finnish professional footballer
- Njazi Kuqi - Finnish footballer
- Shefki Kuqi - Finnish footballer
- Richard Yarsuvat - Swedish International Futsal player
- Naim Terbunja - Swedish professional boxer
- Loret Sadiku - Kosovar Professional footballer
- Besard Sabovic - Swedish footballer
- Drilon Shala - Finnish football player
- Dardan Rexhepi - Kosovar footballer
- Armend Kabashi - Finnish professional football midfielder
- Leonard Pllana - Kosovo Albanian professional footballer
- Agon Mehmeti - Albanian professional footballer
- Lum Rexhepi - Finnish-Kosovar professional footballer
- Shkodran Maholli - Swedish footballer
- Valmir Seferi - Finnish football player
- Kujtime Kurbogaj - Albanian football midfielder
- Fitim Kastrati - Norwegian football midfielder
- Xhevdet Gela - Finnish football player
- Nooralotta Neziri - Finnish 100 meter hurdler
- Tani Stafsula - Finnish football player
- Dafina Memedov - Swedish Albanian football midfielder
- Bardhec Bytyqi - Danish footballer
- Bashkim Ajdini - German-Swedish professional footballer
- Ylldren Ibrahimaj - Norwegian footballer
- Elbasan Rashani - Norwegian footballer
