= Impeachment inquiry into Bill Clinton =

1998 US investigation of president

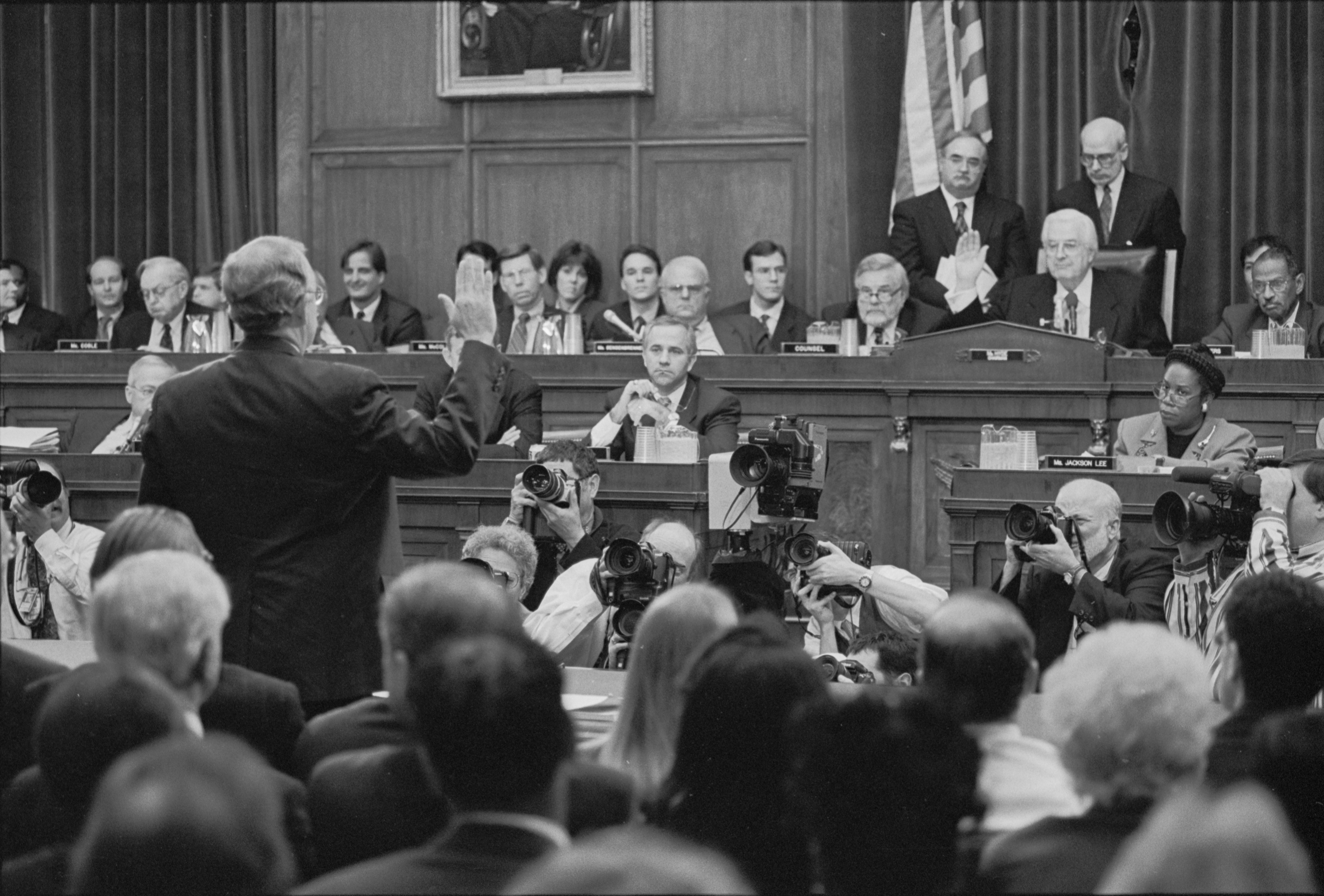
- Independent Counsel Ken Starr taking oath before testifying before the House Committee on the Judiciary in November 1998
- Accused: Bill Clinton, 42nd president of the United States
- Proponents: Newt Gingrich (speaker of the United States House of Representatives); Ken Starr (Independent counsel for the Whitewater controversy); Henry Hyde (chair of the House Committee on the Judiciary)
- Committee: Judiciary
- Committee chair: Henry Hyde
- Date: October 8 – December 19, 1998 (2 months, 1 week and 4 days)
- Outcome: Impeachment inquiry completed; House Committee on the Judiciary forwards four articles of impeachment to the full House
- Charges: Perjury; Obstruction of justice; Abuse of Power
- Cause: Clinton's testimony denying that he had engaged in a sexual relationship with Monica Lewinsky in a sexual harassment lawsuit filed against Clinton by Paula Jones; allegations made in the Starr Report

Congressional votes

House vote on resolution authorizing the inquiry
- Votes in favor: 258
- Votes against: 176
- Result: Adopted

Voting in the House Committee on the Judiciary on articles of impeachment
- Accusation: Perjury / grand jury
- Votes in favor: 21
- Votes against: 17
- Result: Approved
- Accusation: Perjury / Jones case
- Votes in favor: 20
- Votes against: 18
- Result: Approved
- Accusation: Obstruction of justice
- Votes in favor: 21
- Votes against: 17
- Result: Approved
- Accusation: Abuse of power
- Votes in favor: 21
- Votes against: 17
- Result: Approved
- Committee forwarded the four proposed articles of impeachment to the full House for consideration

The impeachment inquiry against Bill Clinton, the 42nd president of the United States, was initiated by a vote of the United States House of Representatives on October 8, 1998, roughly a month after the release of the Starr Report. The House, led by Republican speaker Newt Gingrich, voted to authorize a broad impeachment inquiry against President Clinton. The inquiry was conducted by the House Committee on the Judiciary.

The committee ultimately authored and approved four proposed articles of impeachment for consideration by the full House. Subsequently, on December 19, 1998, the full House voted to approve the first and third proposed articles, while rejecting the second and fourth proposed articles, thereby impeaching Bill Clinton.

== Background ==
In 1994, Paula Jones filed a lawsuit accusing Clinton of sexual harassment when he was governor of Arkansas. Clinton attempted to delay a trial until after he left office, but in May 1997 the Supreme Court unanimously rejected Clinton's claim that the Constitution immunized him from civil lawsuits, and shortly thereafter the pre-trial discovery process commenced.

Separate from this, in January 1994, Attorney General Janet Reno appointed Robert B. Fiske as an Independent counsel to investigate the Whitewater controversy. In August of that year, Ken Starr was appointed to replace Fiske in this role.

In 1997, the first effort in congress to start an impeachment against Clinton was launched by Republican congressman Bob Barr.

Paula Jones's attorneys wanted to prove Clinton had engaged in a pattern of behavior with women who supported her claims. In late 1997, Linda Tripp began secretly recording conversations with her friend Monica Lewinsky, a former intern and Department of Defense employee. In those recordings, Lewinsky divulged that she had a sexual relationship with Clinton. Tripp shared this information with Jones's lawyers, who added Lewinsky to their witness list in December 1997. According to the Starr Report, a U.S. federal government report written by Ken Starr on his investigation of President Clinton, after Lewinsky appeared on the witness list Clinton began taking steps to conceal their relationship. Some of the steps he took included suggesting to Lewinsky that she file a false affidavit to misdirect the investigation, encouraging her to use cover stories, concealing gifts he had given her, and attempting to help her find gainful employment to try to influence her testimony.

In May 1997, the United States Supreme Court rejected Clinton's argument that he, as president, should have immunity from civil case, thus allowing Paula Jones' lawsuit against him to proceed.

In a January 17, 1998 sworn deposition related to the Jones lawsuit against him, Clinton denied having a "sexual relationship", "sexual affair", or "sexual relations" with Lewinsky. His lawyer, Robert S. Bennett, stated with Clinton present that Lewinsky's affidavit showed there was no sex in any manner, shape or form between Clinton and Lewinsky. The Starr Report states that the following day, Clinton "coached" his secretary Betty Currie into repeating his denials should she be called to testify.

Remarks including response to Clinton–Lewinsky scandal (January 26, 1998)
Bill Clinton makes a presentation that ends with a short commentary on the Clinton–Lewinsky scandal. The presentation is known for the quote "I did not have sexual relations with that woman, Miss Lewinsky." (6:22)

Remarks including response to the Clinton–Lewinsky scandal (January 26, 1998)
audio-only version

After rumors of the scandal reached the news, Clinton publicly said, on January 26, 1998, "I did not have sexual relations with that woman, Miss Lewinsky." But months later, Clinton admitted his relationship with Lewinsky was "wrong" and "not appropriate". Lewinsky engaged in oral sex with Clinton several times.

The judge in the Jones case later ruled the Lewinsky matter immaterial, and threw out the case on April 1, 1998, on the grounds that Jones had failed to show any damages. However, Jones appealed this decision.

The Starr Report was released to congress on September 9, 1998 and to the public on September 11. In the report, Starr argued that there were eleven possible grounds for impeachment of Clinton, including perjury, obstruction of justice, witness tampering, and abuse of power. The report also detailed explicit and graphic details of the sexual relationship between Clinton and Lewinsky.

=== Early actions by the House Committee on the Judiciary ===
On September 11, 1998, by a vote of 363-63, the House of Representatives voted for a resolution that would release the Starr Report to the public and authorize a "deliberative review" of it by the House Committee on the Judiciary.

On September 18, over the objections of the Democratic members, the House Committee on the Judiciary voted to release the video of Clinton's grand jury testimony, and more the 3,000 pages of the Starr Report's supporting material, including a sexually explicit testimony by Lewinsky. This content was released on September 21, with the videotape of Clinton's deposition, immediately after its release, being aired by many cable channels across the United States.

The committee announced on September 24 that, in an open session on either October 5 or 6, it would consider a resolution that would initiate an impeachment inquiry against Clinton.

On October 2, the committee released 4,610 more pages of supporting material from the Starr investigation, a cache which included transcripts of grand jury testimony and transcripts of the recordings Linda Tripp made of phone calls and conversations she had with Lewinsky.

On October 5, in a 21–16 vote, the House Committee on the Judiciary voted to recommend a formal impeachment inquiry.

== House vote authorizing the inquiry ==
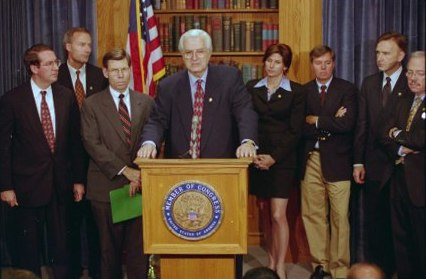
Chair of the House Committee on the Judiciary Henry Hyde and other Republican members of the committee hold a press conference on October 8, 1998

On October 8, 1998, the Republican controlled House of Representatives authorized an inquiry through a bipartisan vote (House Resolution 581) of 258–176, with 31 Democrats joining Republicans. The resolution authorize the House Committee on the Judiciary to investigate whether grounds existed for an impeachment of Clinton.

Before the vote on the bill authorizing the inquiry, a vote was held on a motion that would send the bill back to the House Committee on the Judiciary with recommended revisions. This motion was rejected by a House vote of 236–198. All but ten Democrats had supported the failed motion, along with one Republican (Jay Dickey) and the House's sole independent congressman (Bernie Sanders). One Republican (Deborah Pryce) did not vote.

Vote on authorizing the House Committee on the Judiciary to launch an impeachment inquiry
Party	Vote on H. R. 581, Authorizing and directing the Committee on the Judiciary to investigate whether sufficient grounds exist for the impeachment of William Jefferson Clinton, President of the United States			
Party	Yeas	Nay	Present	Not voting
Democratic (206)	31	175	–	–
Republican (228)	227	–	–	1: Deborah Pryce
Independent (1)	–	1: Bernie Sanders	–	–
Total (435)	258	176	0	1

== Members of the House Committee on the Judiciary ==
The table below shows the members of the House Committee on the Judiciary, who conducted the inquiry. The names are divided by party, and ranked by seniority.

Majority party (Republican)	Minority party (Democratic)
Henry Hyde, Illinois chair; Jim Sensenbrenner, Wisconsin; Bill McCollum, Florida; George Gekas, Pennsylvania; Howard Coble, North Carolina; Lamar Smith, Texas; Elton Gallegly, California; Charles T. Canady, Florida; Bob Inglis, South Carolina; Bob Goodlatte, Virginia; Steve Buyer, Indiana; Ed Bryant, Tennessee; Steve Chabot, Ohio; Bob Barr, Georgia; Bill Jenkins, Tennessee; Asa Hutchinson, Arkansas; Edward A. Pease, Indiana; Chris Cannon, Utah; James E. Rogan, California; Lindsey Graham, South Carolina; Mary Bono, California	John Conyers, Michigan ranking member; Barney Frank, Massachusetts; Chuck Schumer, New York; Howard Berman, California; Rick Boucher, Virginia; Jerry Nadler, New York; Bobby Scott, Virginia; Mel Watt, North Carolina; Zoe Lofgren, California; Sheila Jackson Lee, Texas; Maxine Waters, California; Marty Meehan, Massachusetts; Bill Delahunt, Massachusetts; Robert Wexler, Florida; Steve Rothman, New Jersey; Tom Barrett, Wisconsin

== Pre-midterm election developments ==
Since Ken Starr had already completed an extensive investigation, the House Committee on the Judiciary conducted no investigations of its own into Clinton's alleged wrongdoing and held no serious impeachment-related hearings before the 1998 midterm elections.

== Impact of inquiry on midterm elections ==
Impeachment was one of the major issues in the 1998 midterm elections. In the closing week of campaigning, Republicans changed tactics and began running television ads attacking Democrats for Clinton's sexual affair with Lewinsky.

In the November 1998 House elections, held on November 3, the Democrats picked up five seats in the House, but the Republicans still maintained majority control. The results went against what House Speaker Newt Gingrich predicted, who, before the election, had been reassured by private polling that Clinton's scandal would result in Republican gains of up to thirty House seats.

Exit polls of the midterm showed that most Americans opposed impeachment. However, neither notably high Democratic or Republican turnout occurred in the midterms, despite speculation that the impeachment process might affect voter turnout.

== Post-midterm developments ==
Shortly after the elections, House speaker Gingrich, who had been one of the leading advocates for impeachment, announced he would resign from Congress as soon as he was able to find somebody to fill his vacant seat. Gingrich would ultimately fulfill this pledge, and officially resigned from Congress on January 3, 1999.

Impeachment proceedings were held during the post-election, "lame duck" session of the outgoing 105th United States Congress. Unlike the case of the 1974 impeachment process against Richard Nixon, the committee hearings were perfunctory but the floor debate in the whole House was spirited on both sides.

On November 9, a house subcommittee heard from legal experts as to whether Clinton's behavior had risen to the level of an impeachable offense.

On November 13, 1998, Clinton agreed to pay a $850,000 settlement to Jones in her sexual harassment lawsuit, after four years of litigation. The arrangement did not include an apology from Clinton.

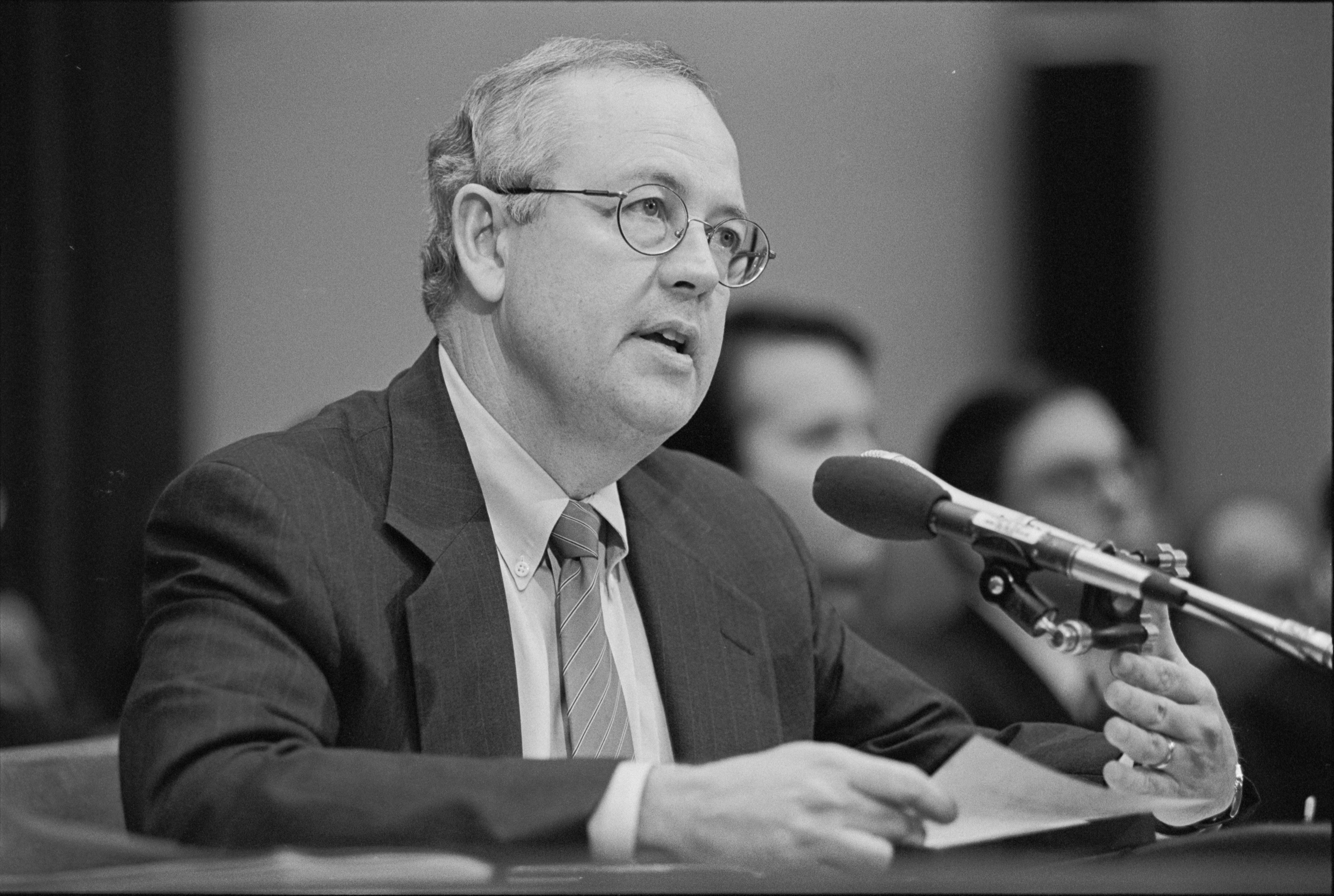
Ken Starr testifying before the House Committee on the Judiciary

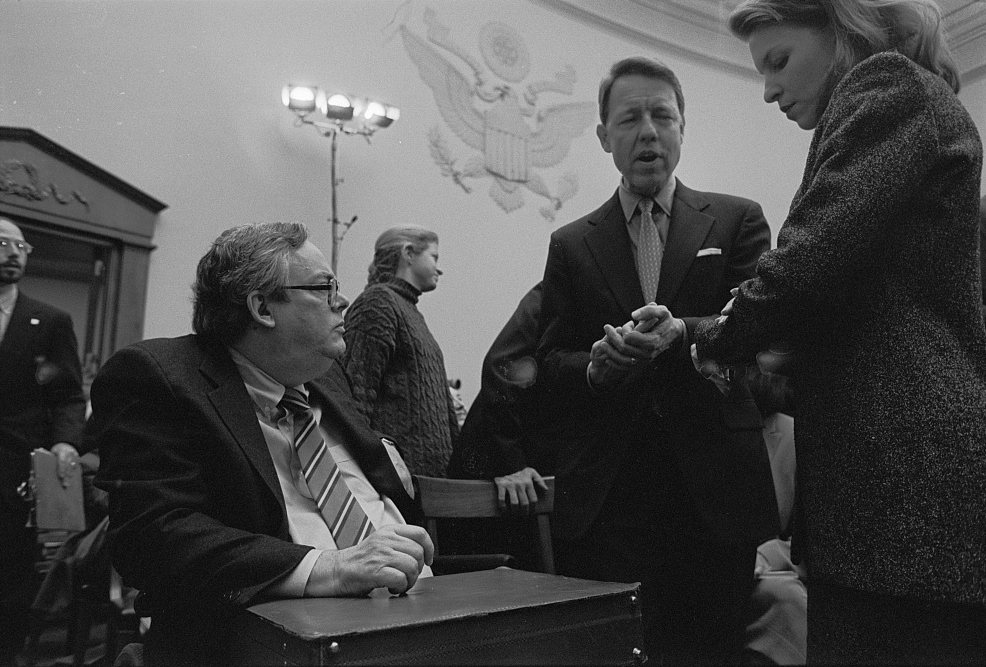
White House Counsel Charles Ruff at November 19 hearing

On November 19, Ken Starr presented his case against Clinton to the House Committee on the Judiciary. Starr declared that Clinton had repeatedly chosen "deception" and engaged in an "unlawful effort to thwart the judicial process". In this session, the Democrats on the committee questioned Starr on his methods of investigation.

On November 28, Clinton delivered written answers to 81 questions that the House Committee on the Judiciary had given him. Republicans voiced disappointment and outrage at Clinton's responses, which they criticized as being evasive, incomplete, weak in defense, and legalistic.

On a party-line vote held on December 1, the House Committee on the Judiciary voted to expand the scope of their inquiry to include alleged campaign finance abuse, and to approve subpoenas for Attorney General Janet Reno, Director of the FBI Louis Freeh and federal prosecutor Charles LaBella. However, on December 3, Henry Hyde, the chairman of the House Committee on the Judiciary, told Republicans that the campaign financing allegations would no longer be a part of the impeachment discussions.

On December 4, Clinton's lawyers requested that the House Committee on the Judiciary allot them three to four days to make a defense presentation. On December 6, they were granted 30 hours stretched over two days to make their defense case before the committee. In a day-long session on December 8, Clinton's legal team and three panels of witnesses testifying on Clinton's behalf argued that Clinton's behavior did not call for impeachment.

On December 11, Clinton released another apology for his actions, declaring himself "profoundly sorry" and willing to accept a censure. The same day, the House Committee on the Judiciary agreed to send three articles of impeachment to the full House for consideration. The vote on two articles, grand jury perjury and obstruction of justice, was 21–17, both along party lines. On the other, perjury in the Paula Jones case, the committee voted 20–18, with Republican Lindsey Graham joining with Democrats, in order to give President Clinton "the legal benefit of the doubt". The next day, December 12, the committee voted to send a fourth and final article, for abuse of power, to the full House by a 21–17 vote, again, along party lines.

== Subsequent impeachment process developments ==
Also on December 12, a Democratic proposal to censure Clinton as an alternative to impeaching him was defeated.

On December 15, 1998, a group of eleven moderate House Republicans declared that they would vote to impeach Clinton, which deflated Clinton's hopes that Republicans may lack the votes to successfully impeach him.

Debate on impeachment was delayed from December 17 to December 18 by Republicans after the December 16 onset of the bombing of Iraq. The same day, House Speaker-designate, Representative Bob Livingston (chosen by the Republican Party Conference to replace Gingrich as House Speaker) admitted to his own marital infidelity, but tried to draw a distinction between him and Clinton, by pointing out that his own infidelity was not with a staff member, nor had he ever been asked to testify under oath about his infidelities, unlike Clinton.

On December 18, House debate began. That day, a survey of House members by CNN indicated that at least one of the four proposed articles of impeachment did not have enough votes to be approved.

On December 19, before the House would begin impeachment debate for the day, Livingston announced the end of his candidacy for Speaker and his resignation from Congress from the floor of the House after his own marital infidelity had come to light. In the same speech, Livingston also encouraged Clinton to resign. Clinton chose to remain in office and urged Livingston to reconsider his resignation.

On December 19, after thirteen and a half hours of debate spread over two days, the House of Representatives narrowly approved two of the four proposed articles of impeachment sent to it by the House Committee on the Judiciary.

An impeachment trial was held in the Senate between January 7 and February 12, 1999, concluding with an acquittal after both articles of impeachment failed to receive the requisite two-thirds threshold of “guilty” votes to convict.

== Public opinion ==
Per Pew Research Center polling, the impeachment process against Clinton was generally unpopular.
