= Stephen S. Oswald =

American astronaut (born 1951)

Stephen Oswald
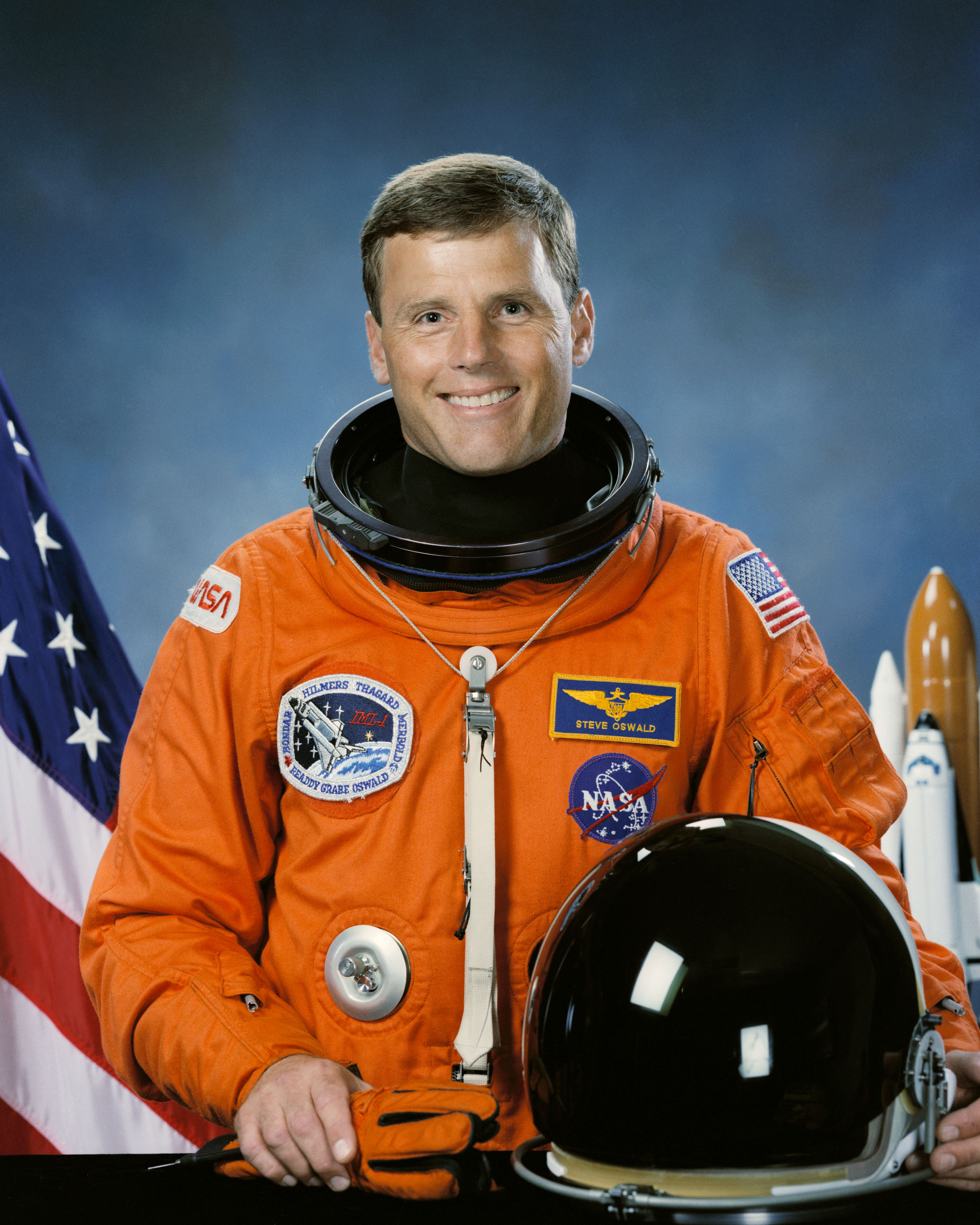
- Born: Stephen Scot Oswald; June 30, 1951 (age 75); Seattle, Washington, U.S.
- Education: United States Naval Academy (BS)
- Spouse: Mary Bono (m. 2015)
- Children: 3
- Awards: Distinguished Flying Cross
- Space career

NASA astronaut
- Rank: Rear Admiral, USN
- Time in space: 33d 22h 30m
- Selection: NASA Group 11 (1985)
- Missions: STS-42; STS-56; STS-67
- Retired: January 2000

Stephen Scot Oswald (born June 30, 1951) is an American former pilot and NASA astronaut.

== Early life and education ==
Born June 30, 1951, in Seattle, Washington, but considers Bellingham, Washington, to be his hometown. He graduated from Bellingham High School in 1969 and earned a Bachelor of Science degree in aerospace engineering from the United States Naval Academy in 1973.

== Career ==
=== U.S. Navy service ===
Oswald graduated from the U.S. Naval Academy in 1973, and was designated a Naval Aviator in September 1974. Following training in the A-7 Corsair II aircraft, he flew aboard the aircraft carrier USS Midway from 1975 to 1977. In 1978, Oswald attended the United States Naval Test Pilot School at Patuxent River, Maryland. Upon graduation, he remained at the Naval Air Test Center conducting flying qualities, performance, and propulsion flight tests on the A-7 and F/A-18 Hornet aircraft until 1981. Following tours as an F/A-18 flight instructor and as a catapult officer aboard USS Coral Sea, Oswald resigned from active Navy duty and joined Westinghouse Electric Corporation as a civilian test pilot. As a reservist, Rear Adm. Oswald flew the RF-8 and the A-7 until 1988 when he transferred to the fledgling Naval Reserve space community. His assignments included three command tours, the last of which was at the Navy Space Systems Division in the Pentagon as Director, Naval Space Reserve Program. In 2000 and 2001, he served on active duty as Deputy Commander, Joint Task Force – Computer Network Operations based in Washington, D.C. He was assigned as the Reserve Deputy to the Deputy Chief of Naval Operations for Warfare Requirements and Programs (OPNAV N6/7) in The Pentagon.

He has logged 7,000+ flight hours in over 40 different aircraft.

=== NASA experience ===
Oswald joined NASA in November 1984 as an aerospace engineer and instructor pilot and was selected as an astronaut candidate in June 1985. His technical assignments within the Astronaut Office have included: flight crew representative to Kennedy Space Center; flight software testing with the Shuttle Avionics Integration Laboratory; crew representative to the Marshall Space Flight Center on solid rocket booster redesign; and spacecraft communicator (CAPCOM) in the Mission Control Center during Space Shuttle missions. He was also the Chief of the Operations Development Branch within the Astronaut Office and served as Assistant Director of Engineering at Johnson Space Center.

Oswald has piloted two missions aboard the Space Shuttle Discovery: STS-42, the International Microgravity Laboratory-1 mission, flown in January 1992, and STS-56, the second Atmospheric Laboratory for Applications and Science (ATLAS-2) mission, flown in April 1993. Oswald commanded STS-67, the second flight of the Astro observatory (Astro II), which flew on the Space Shuttle Endeavour in March 1995. This mission established a mission duration record for Space Shuttle at 17 days. With the completion of his third space flight, Oswald has logged over 33 days in space.

After STS-67, Oswald was assigned to NASA Headquarters in Washington, D.C., as deputy associate administrator for space operations. In this capacity, he was responsible for Space Shuttle, expendable launch vehicles, and space communications for the agency. After nearly two and a half years in Washington, Oswald returned to the Astronaut Office in July 1998.

Oswald retired from NASA in January 2000.

== Organizations and awards ==
Oswald is an Eagle Scout and recipient of the Distinguished Eagle Scout Award from the Boy Scouts of America.

Member of the Society of Experimental Test Pilots, the Association of Space Explorers, the Naval Reserve Association, and the American Institute of Aeronautics and Astronautics.

Recipient of the Legion of Merit, the Distinguished Flying Cross, the Meritorious Service Medal, the Navy Commendation Medal (2), the NASA Outstanding Leadership Medal, the NASA Exceptional Service Medal (2), the NASA Space Flight Medal (3), and various service awards.

== Personal life ==
Oswald is married to Mary Bono who served as a United States representative from California from 1998 to 2013. He has three children from a previous marriage.

In 2002, his youngest brother, Navy SEAL Commander Peter G. Oswald was killed in El Salvador during a helicopter fast-roping accident during joint training exercises with the Salvadoran forces.
