= Albanians in the Nordic countries =

Ethnic group in the Nordic countries

Total population
- 96,633

Regions with significant populations
- Sweden: 54,239^{a}
- Norway: 21,809^{a}
- Finland: 12,362
- Denmark: 8,223^{a}

Languages
- Albanian; Danish; Finnish; Norwegian; Swedish

Religion
- Christianity; Islam; Judaism; Irreligion
- ^{a} The estimation contains nationals from Albania and Kosovo.

The Albanians in the Nordic countries (Albanian: Shqiptarët në vendet nordike) refers to the Albanian migrants in Nordic countries such as Denmark, Faroe Islands, Finland, Norway and Sweden and their descendants.

The Albanians mostly trace their origins to Albania, Kosovo, North Macedonia and to a lesser extent to other Albanian-speaking territories in the Balkan Peninsula. Their exact number is difficult to determine as some ethnic Albanians hold other citizenship than Albanian or Kosovan.

Albania and Kosovo maintain close and friendly diplomatic and political ties with the Nordic countries. Denmark, Finland, Norway and Sweden have been among the first countries to officially recognise the self-proclaimed Independence of Kosovo and its sovereignty.

== Norway ==
Based on data of the Statistisk Sentralbyrå of 2018, there were approximately 18,500 Albanians (0.34% of the total population) geographically distributed in the territory of Norway composed of 15,642 (0.29% of the total population) Kosovan nationals and 2,111 people (0.04% of the total population) with Albanian nationality. The exact number of Albanians in the country could be higher which would as well include the Albanians from North Macedonia or other Albanian-speaking territories in the Balkan Peninsula but the data in Norway gives no indication of ethnic backgrounds. The historical conflicts in the Balkans, especially the Kosovo War, set in motion large population movements of ethnic Albanians to the country and elsewhere. Around 6,000 Albanians from Kosovo were evacuated to Norway from North Macedonia in 1999.

The electoral districts with the most significant concentration of Albanians are Akershus, Buskerud, Oslo, Østfold and Rogaland predominantly in southern Norway. The most lesser number are to be found in Finnmark, Sogn og Fjordane and Nordland. The city, county and metropolitan area of Oslo in southern Norway remain the prime destination of Albanian migrants in the country.

Electoral districts Valgkretser i Norge	(Albania) Albanian nationals 2018	(Kosovo) Kosovan nationals 2018
Akershus	315	2,298
Aust-Agder	12	304
Buskerud	64	1,545
Finnmark	9	31
Hedmark	19	426
Hordaland	107	389
Møre og Romsdal	54	151
Nordland	31	87
Oppland	43	319
Oslo	1,010	2,924
Østfold	132	2,792
Rogaland	106	1,220
Sogn og Fjordane	10	39
Telemark	27	750
Troms	50	51
Trøndelag	36	356
Vest-Agder	43	940
Vestfold	43	1,020
Norway	2,111	15,642

== Denmark ==
The Albanians migrated to Denmark in two main groups - firstly through Yugoslavian labor migration, which spanned from the 1960s to 1970s, and later as a result of the Yugoslav wars. Many of said Yugoslavs came from Macedonia; an estimated 2,000 ethnic Albanians. In Greater Copenhagen, many Yugoslav immigrants are ethnic Albanians from Tetovo, Resen, and surrounding regions.

It is estimated that there are about 15,000 Albanian speakers from Albania, Kosovo, North Macedonia and Serbia in Denmark. Albanian has been continuously taught in Copenhagen and some other communities for some time.

The Albanian community in Denmark has long gone unnoticed. It gained publicity in recent years with the killing of an young Albanian boy. Kosovar Albanian migrants founded the Radio Television Voice of Kosovo in Denmark (RTVZiK).

The regions with the most significant concentration of Albanians in Denmark are Hovedstaden and Syddanmark mostly to the south and southeast of Denmark. The most lesser number are to be found in Nordjylland in the north of the country.

Regions of Denmark Regioner i Danmark	(Albania) Albanian nationals 2018	(Kosovo) Kosovan nationals 2018
Hovedstaden	381	479
Sjælland	54	521
Syddanmark	104	1,396
Midtjylland	105	505
Nordjylland	29	258
Denmark	673	3,159

== Finland ==
Albanians in Finland are active in cultural events and other similar meetings. The Albanian Association "Bashkimi" is a cultural association established in 1998, in Turku, a city in southern Finland where roughly 1,800 Albanians live. A recently taken demographic report has revealed that ca. 20,000 Albanians emigrated to the country between 1990 and 2016.

== Sweden ==
Albanians in Sweden (Albanian: Shqiptarët në Suedi; Swedish: Albaner i Sverige) are ethnic Albanians living in Sweden, numbering at 54,239 people.

Rank	County	Population	% of total
1	Skåne County	15,918	29.4%
2	Stockholm County	11,428	21.1%
3	Västra Götaland County	8,764	16.2%
4	Uppsala County	2,819	5.2%
5	Örebro County	2,108	3.9%
Sweden total		54,239	100%
Source: Statistics Sweden (SCB), 31 December 2024

The Diaspora Ministry of Kosovo has stated that "Sweden has the best conditions for the Albanian diaspora". Sweden is exemplary in promoting the teaching of Albanian in schools. One of the three state cultural centers of the Albanian diaspora in Sweden, is lying for example in Halland.

Albanska Fotbolls Föreningen "Albanska FF", Rinia Idrottsförenig "Rinia IF" and "Prespa" are two Albanian football teams in Sweden.

Radio Dituria is an Albanian radiostation located in Borås. The radiostation focuses on Albanian culture and tradition.

== Notable people ==
Selected people:

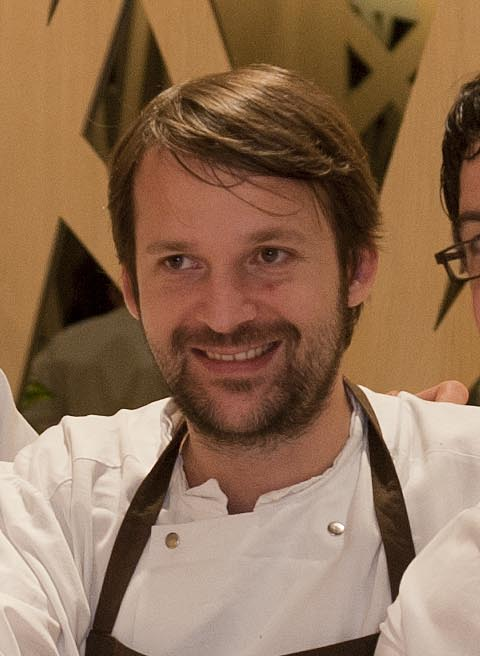
René Redzepi

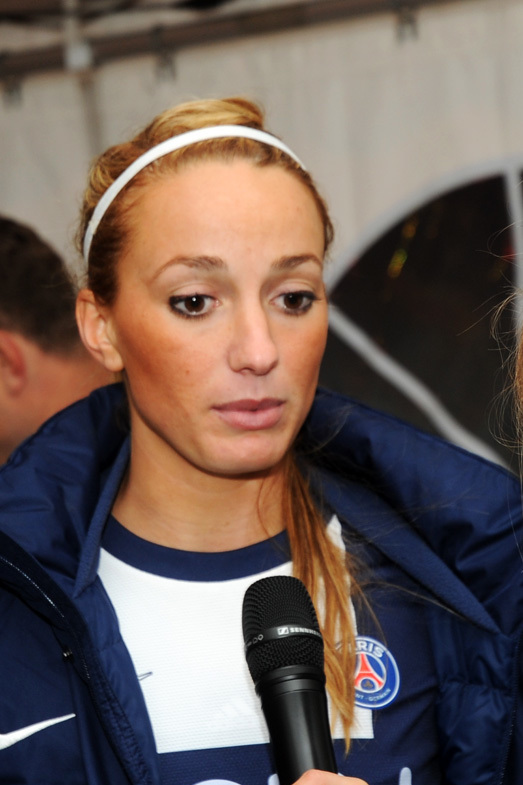
Kosovare Asllani

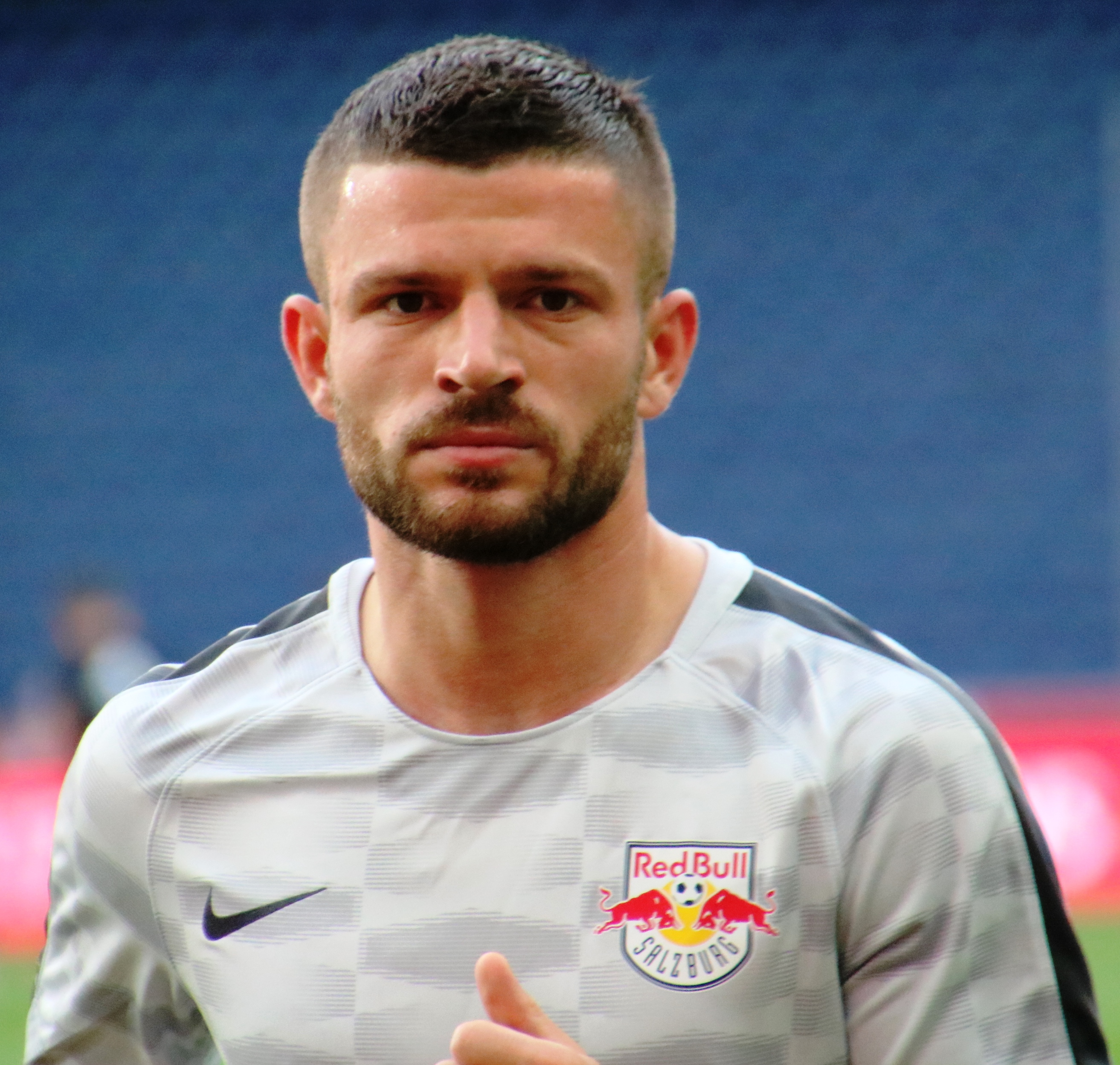
Valon Berisha

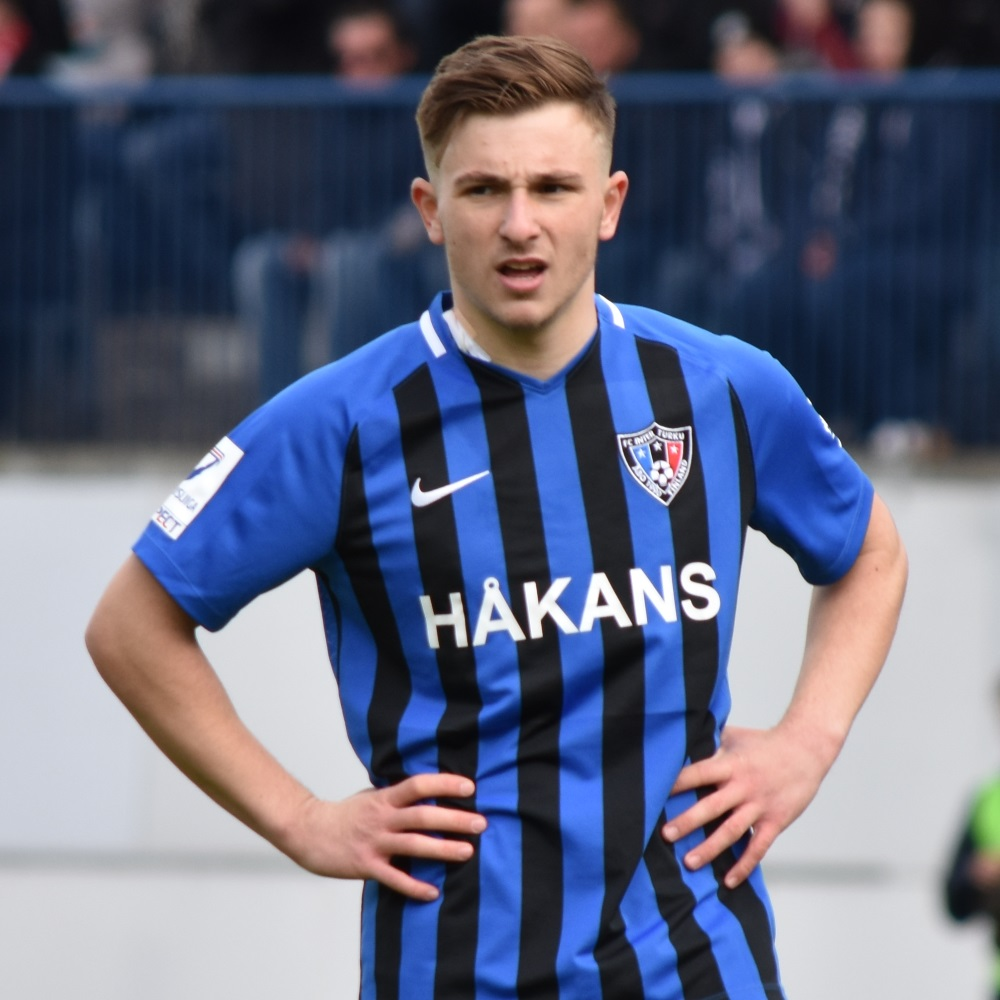
Albion Ademi

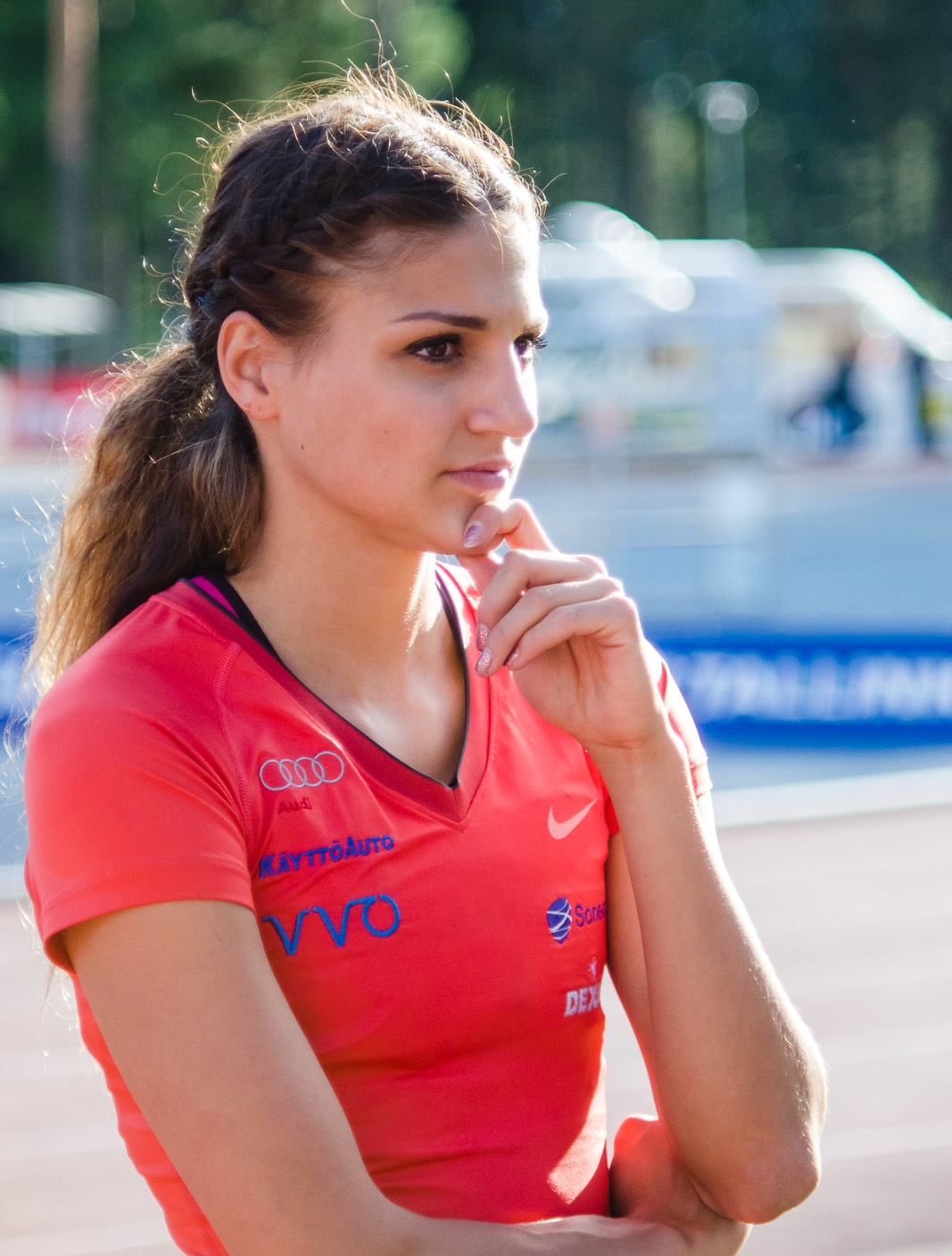
Nooralotta Neziri

== See also ==
- Albanian diaspora
- Immigration to Denmark
- Immigration to Finland
- Immigration to Norway
- Immigration to Sweden
