= STS-67 =

1995 American crewed spaceflight

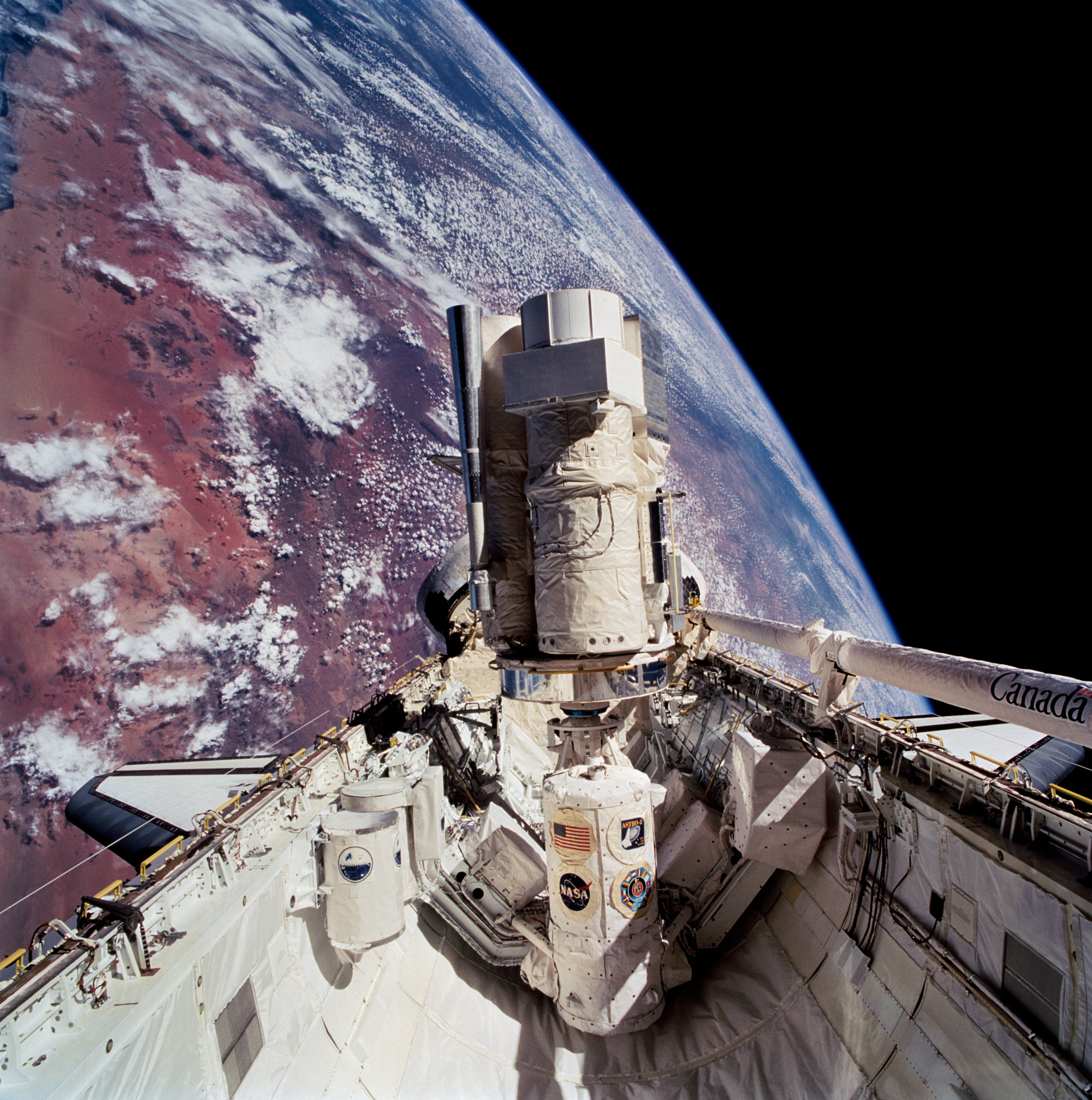
- ASTRO-2 in Endeavour's payload bay
- Names: Space Transportation System-67
- Mission type: Astronomy
- Operator: NASA
- COSPAR ID: 1995-007A
- SATCAT no.: 23500
- Mission duration: 16 days, 15 hours, 8 minutes, 48 seconds
- Distance travelled: 11,100,000 kilometres (6,900,000 mi)
- Orbits completed: 262

Spacecraft properties
- Spacecraft: Space Shuttle Endeavour
- Payload mass: 13,116 kilograms (28,916 lb)

Crew
- Crew size: 7
- Members: Stephen S. Oswald; William G. Gregory; John M. Grunsfeld; Wendy B. Lawrence; Tamara E. Jernigan; Samuel T. Durrance; Ronald A. Parise

Start of mission
- Launch date: March 2, 1995, 06:38:13 UTC, 1:38:13 am EDT
- Launch site: Kennedy, LC-39A

End of mission
- Landing date: March 18, 1995, 21:47:01 UTC, 1:47:01 pm PDT
- Landing site: Edwards, Runway 22

Orbital parameters
- Reference system: Geocentric
- Regime: Low Earth
- Perigee altitude: 305 kilometres (190 mi)
- Apogee altitude: 305 kilometres (190 mi)
- Inclination: 28.45 degrees
- Period: 91.5 min
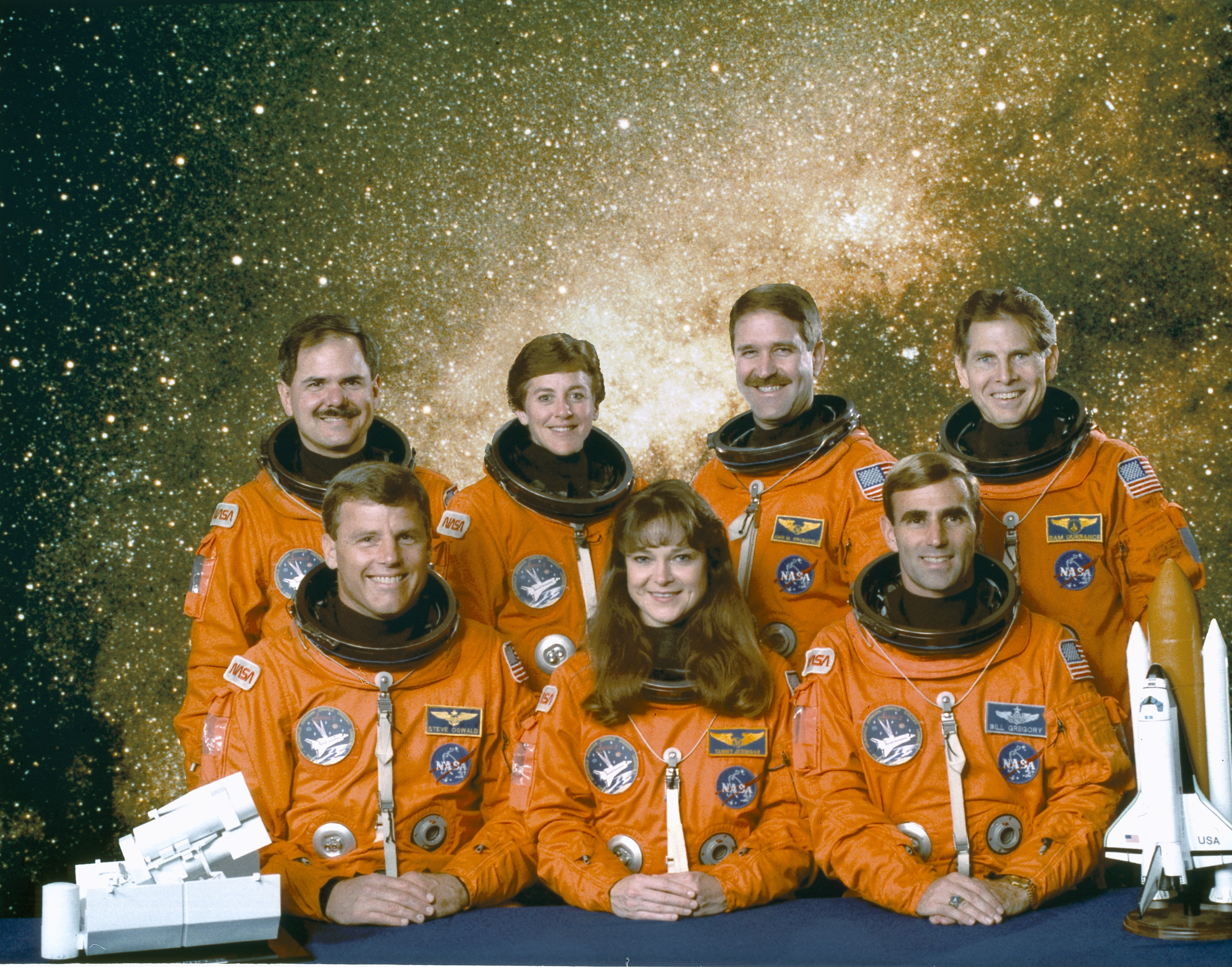
- Left to right – Front row: Oswald, Jernigan, Gregory; Back row: Parise, Lawrence, Grunsfeld, Durrance Space Shuttle program

STS-67 was a human spaceflight mission using Space Shuttle Endeavour that launched from Kennedy Space Center, Florida on March 2, 1995.

== Crew ==
Position	Astronaut
Commander	Stephen S. Oswald; Third and last spaceflight
Pilot	William G. Gregory; Only spaceflight
Mission Specialist 1	John M. Grunsfeld; First spaceflight
Mission Specialist 2 Flight Engineer	Wendy B. Lawrence; First spaceflight
Mission Specialist 3	Tamara E. Jernigan; Third spaceflight
Payload Specialist 1	Samuel T. Durrance; Second and last spaceflight
Payload Specialist 2	Ronald A. Parise; Second and last spaceflight
Member of Blue Team; Member of Red Team

=== Crew seat assignments ===
Seat	Launch	Landing	Seats 1–4 are on the flight deck. Seats 5–7 are on the mid-deck.
1	Oswald		Seats 1–4 are on the flight deck. Seats 5–7 are on the mid-deck.
2	Gregory		Seats 1–4 are on the flight deck. Seats 5–7 are on the mid-deck.
3	Grunsfeld	Jernigan	Seats 1–4 are on the flight deck. Seats 5–7 are on the mid-deck.
4	Lawrence		Seats 1–4 are on the flight deck. Seats 5–7 are on the mid-deck.
5	Jernigan	Grunsfeld	Seats 1–4 are on the flight deck. Seats 5–7 are on the mid-deck.
6	Durrance		Seats 1–4 are on the flight deck. Seats 5–7 are on the mid-deck.
7	Parise		Seats 1–4 are on the flight deck. Seats 5–7 are on the mid-deck.

== Mission highlights ==
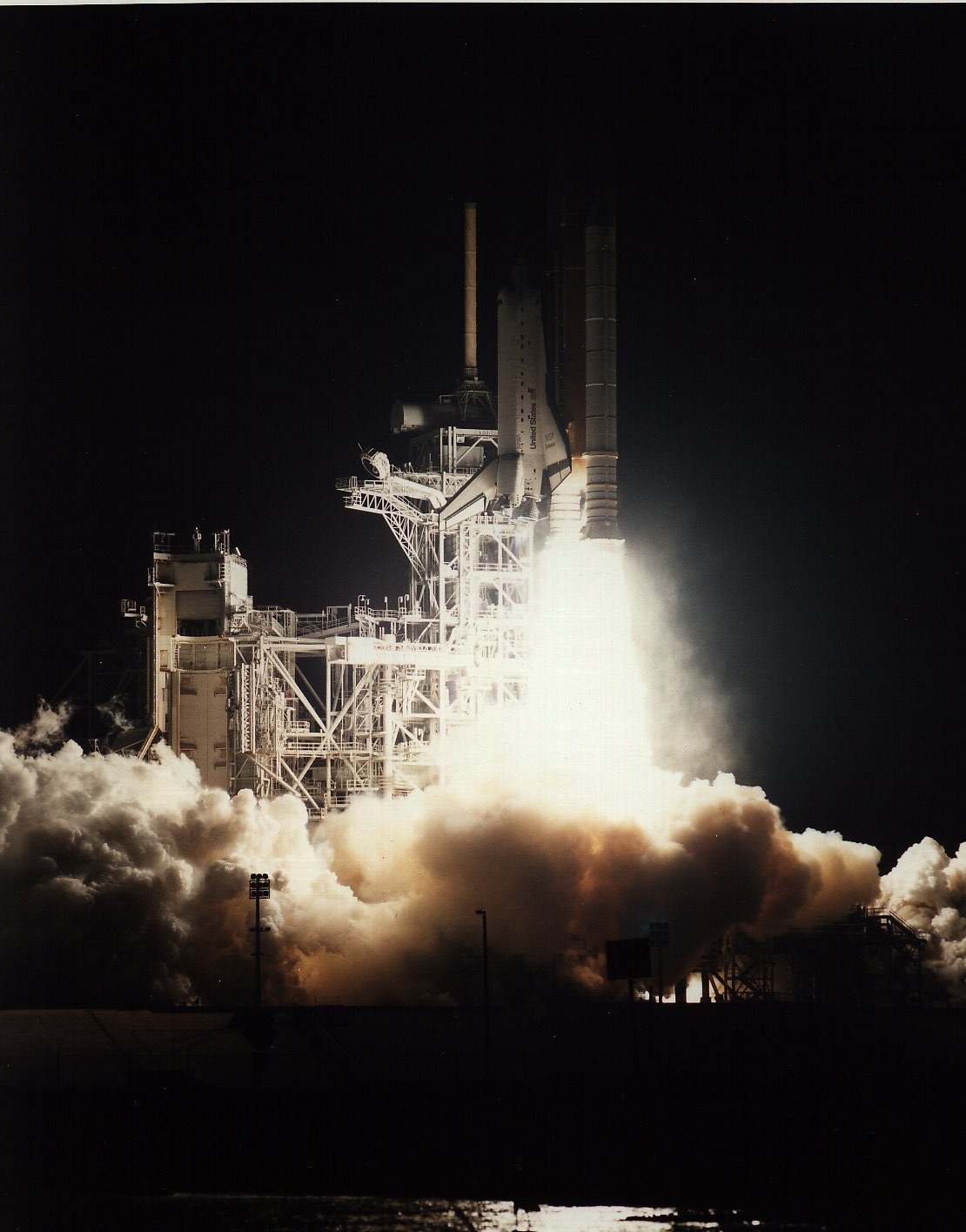
Space Shuttle Endeavour launches from Kennedy Space Center, March 2, 1995

=== Ultraviolet Imaging Experiments ===
Astro-2 was the second dedicated Spacelab mission to conduct astronomical observations in the ultraviolet spectral regions (the first was the Astro-1 mission flown on STS-35). The Astro-2 Spacelab consisted of three unique instruments – the Hopkins Ultraviolet Telescope (HUT), the Ultraviolet Imaging Telescope (UIT) and the Wisconsin Ultraviolet Photo-Polarimeter Experiment (WUPPE). These took measurements from objects within the Solar System as well as individual stars, nebulae, supernova remnants, galaxies and active extragalactic objects. The data supplemented the data obtained from the Astro-1 mission.

The purpose of the UIT was to observe UV radiation from space (most UV radiation is absorbed by Earth's atmosphere and cannot be studied from the ground). The data collected from UIT Astro-1 mission provided the first accurate knowledge of UV data from the universe. The UIT in the Astro-2 Spacelab was capable of capturing almost twice the UV spectrum of its predecessor. As STS-67 launched at a different time of year from STS-35, data was collected from portions of the sky that Astro-1 was not able to view.

=== Middeck Active Control Experiment (MACE) ===
On the Middeck, science experiments included the Protein Crystal Growth Thermal Enclosure System Vapor Diffusion Apparatus-03 experiment (PCG-TES-03), the Protein Crystal Growth Single Thermal Enclosure System-02 (PCG-STES-02), the Shuttle Amateur Radio Experiment-II (SAREX-II), the Middeck Active Control Experiment (MACE), the Commercial Materials Dispersion Apparatus Instrumentation Technology Associates Experiments-03 (CMIX-03) and the Midcourse Space Experiment (MSX).

The Middeck Active Control Experiment (MACE) was a space engineering research payload and activity. It consisted of a rate gyro, reaction wheels, a precision pointing payload, and a scanning and pointing payload that produces motion disturbances. The goal of the experiment was to test a closed loop control system that could compensate for motion disturbances. On orbit, Commander Stephen S. Oswald and Pilot William G. Gregory used MACE to test about 200 different motion disturbance situations over 45 hours of testing during the mission. Information from MACE was to be used to design better control systems that compensate for motion in future spacecraft.

== Getaway Special Payloads ==
Two Get Away Special (GAS) payloads were also on board. They were the G-387 and G-388 canisters. This experiment was sponsored by the Australian Space Office and AUSPACE ltd. The objectives were to make ultraviolet observations of deep space or nearby galaxies. These observations were made to study the structure of galactic supernova remnants, the distribution of hot gas in the Magellanic Clouds, the hot galactic halo emission, and emission associated with galactic cooling flows and jets. The two GAS canisters were interconnected with a cable. Canister 1 had a motorized door assembly that exposed a UV telescope to space when opened. UV reflective filters on the telescopes optics determine its UV bandpass. Canister 2 contained two video recorders for data storage and batteries to provide experiment power. It was Space Shuttle Endeavour's longest flight and the longest flight overall that was not flown by Columbia.

== Mission insignia ==
The spiral galaxy, Jupiter, and the four moons (total of six space objects) as well as the seven stars of the insignia symbolize the flight's numerical designation in the Space Transportation System's mission sequence. Endeavour, with ASTRO-2, is speeding by.

== See also ==
- List of human spaceflights
- List of Space Shuttle missions
- Outline of space science
- Space Shuttle
- STS-80 (17 day 8 hour Shuttle mission)
- STS-78 (16 day 21 hour Shuttle mission)
- STS-73 (15 days 21 hours Shuttle mission)
