= Mary Bono =

American politician and lobbyist (born 1961)

Mary Bono Oswald
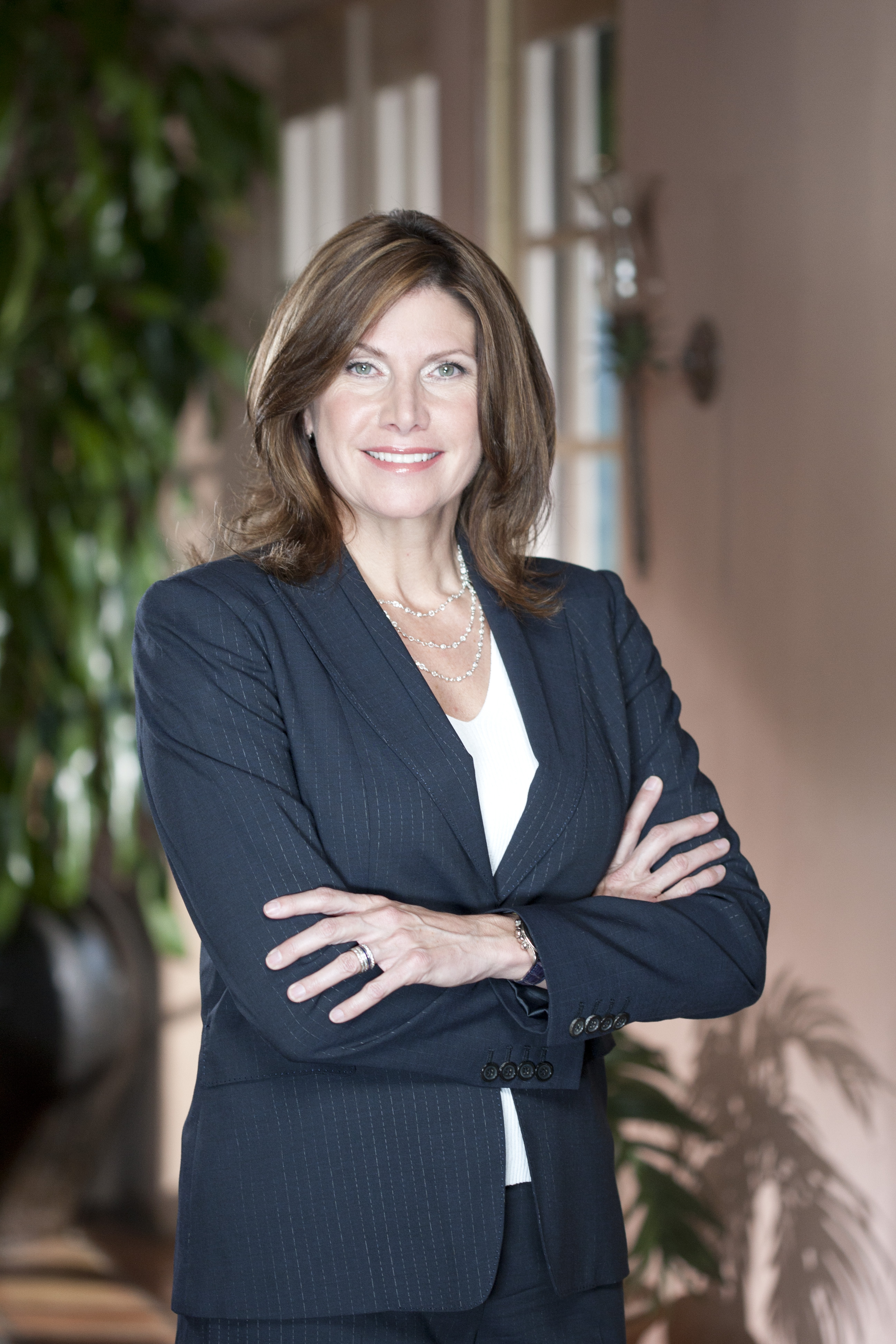
- Official portrait, 2010

Member of the U.S. House of Representatives from California
- In office April 7, 1998 – January 3, 2013 (Note: Bono's official service begins on the date of the special election, while she was not sworn in until April 21, 1998.)
- Preceded by: Sonny Bono
- Succeeded by: Raul Ruiz
- Constituency: 44th district (1998–2003); 45th district (2003–2013)

Personal details
- Born: Mary Whitaker; October 24, 1961 (age 65) Cleveland, Ohio, U.S.
- Party: Republican
- Spouses: Sonny Bono (m. 1986; died 1998); Glenn Baxley (m. 2001; div. 2005); Connie Mack IV (m. 2007; div. 2013); Stephen S. Oswald (m. 2015)
- Children: 2
- Education: University of Southern California (BA)

Mary Bono Oswald (née Whitaker and formerly Mary Bono Mack, born October 24, 1961) is an American politician, businesswoman and lobbyist who represented California's 44th and 45th districts in the U.S. House of Representatives between 1998 and 2013.

A member of the Republican Party, Bono was first elected to Congress in 1998 to replace her late husband, Sonny Bono, who had died in office months earlier. She sat on the Energy and Commerce Committee and was chairwoman of the Subcommittee on Commerce, Manufacturing and Trade. In 1998, Bono served on the House Judiciary Committee that approved articles of impeachment against President Bill Clinton. Bono served in Congress until losing her 2012 reelection bid.

In March 2013, Bono became a senior vice president at the Washington, D.C.-based federal affairs firm Faegre Baker Daniels Consulting. In 2018, she founded the political affairs consulting firm Integritas by Bono.

== Early life and education ==
Bono was born Mary Whitaker in Cleveland, Ohio, the daughter of Karen Lee (née Taylor), a chemist, and Dr. Clay Westerfield Whitaker, a physician and World War II veteran. In 1963, the family moved to South Pasadena, California. She graduated from South Pasadena High School in 1979, then from the University of Southern California in 1984 with a Bachelor of Arts in art history. Whitaker was an accomplished gymnast in her youth and worked as a cocktail waitress during her early twenties.

In 1986, Whitaker married singer, actor, and politician Sonny Bono. They moved to Palm Springs, California where Sonny Bono served as mayor from 1988 to 1992 before being elected to the U.S. House of Representatives in 1994. The congressman died in a skiing accident on January 5, 1998, during his second term in Congress, leaving a vacant seat in the House, which Mary Bono would then pursue.

== Career ==
=== U.S. House of Representatives ===
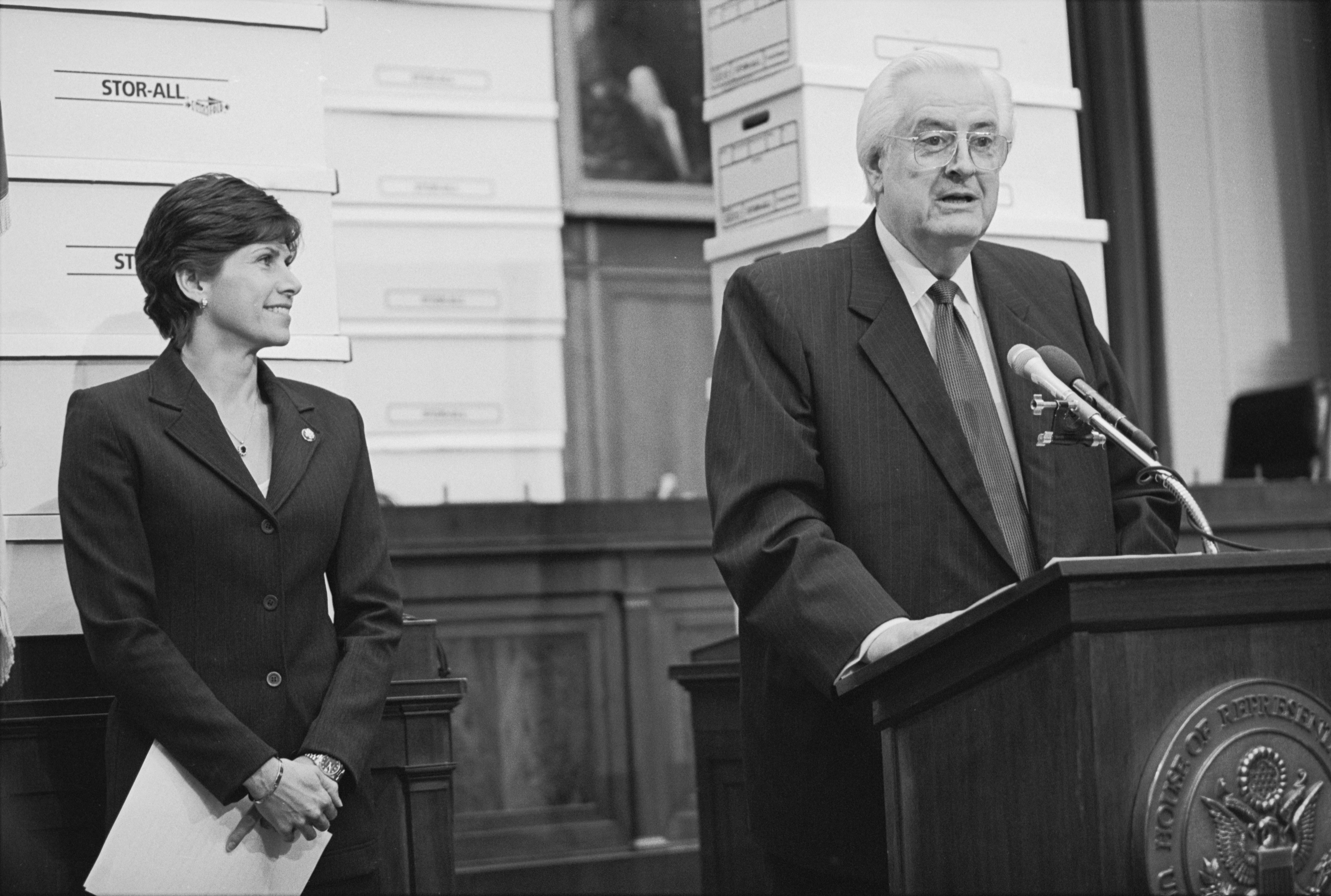
Mary Bono with Henry Hyde during a press conference related to the impeachment inquiry against Bill Clinton

In 1998, Mary Bono won the Republican nomination for the special election to succeed her late husband in what was then California's 44th congressional district. She was then elected to Congress on April 7, 1998. Bono won election to a full term on November 3, 1998.

That same year, Bono was added to the House Judiciary Committee by the Republican leadership in anticipation of the consideration of impeachment proceedings against President Bill Clinton, thus becoming the only Republican woman on the committee during the impeachment inquiry. Bono voted along party lines on all four motions for impeachment in both the committee and on the House floor, despite other moderate Republican House members voting against Articles II, III, and IV. Bono's service on the House Judiciary panel increased her national profile considerably.

Bono served in Congress for 15 years. In 2011, her bill, H.R. 2715, was signed into law with bipartisan support to amend and improve the Consumer Product Safety Improvement Act of 2008. The daughter of a veteran, Bono also played a key role in creation of VA clinics in Blythe and Palm Desert, California. In December 2010, she was one of fifteen Republican House members to vote in favor of repealing the United States military's "Don't Ask, Don't Tell" ban on openly homosexual service members.

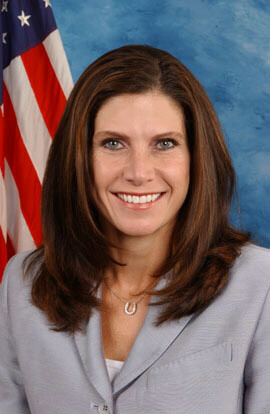
Official portrait

After the 2010 United States census, Bono's district was renumbered as the 36th district and made somewhat more Democratic and Hispanic than its predecessor. In a significant upset, Democratic challenger Raul Ruiz, a physician, defeated her with 53 percent of the vote to Bono's 47.1 percent.

In 2013, Bono was a signatory to an amicus curiae brief submitted to the Supreme Court in support of same-sex marriage during the Hollingsworth v. Perry case.

==== Committee assignments ====
- Committee on Energy and Commerce
  - Subcommittee on Commerce, Manufacturing and Trade (Chairwoman)
  - Subcommittee on Communications and Technology
  - Subcommittee on Environment and Economy
- Committee on Armed Services
- Committee on the Judiciary
- Committee on Small Business

Bono was chairwoman of the House Energy Subcommittee on Commerce, Manufacturing and Trade. This committee debates legislation related to intellectual property, telecommunications, energy and healthcare. She was the first Republican woman to chair this subcommittee. She was co-chair of the Congressional Caucus on Prescription Drug Abuse. In 2012, she formed and chaired the House Women's Policy Committee, which included 24 female Republican lawmakers from 17 states.

==== Caucus memberships ====
- America Supports You Caucus
- Intellectual Property Promotion and Piracy Prevention Caucus (Co-chair)
- International Conservation Caucus
- Recording Arts and Sciences Caucus (Co-chair)
- Congressional Hispanic Conference (associate member)
- Republican Main Street Partnership

=== Post-congressional career ===
In March 2013, Bono became a senior vice president at the Washington, D.C.-based federal affairs firm Faegre Baker Daniels Consulting.

In June 2013, a group of leading telecommunications firms announced formation of the 21st Century Privacy Coalition, which focuses on updating U.S. privacy and data security laws. Mary Bono and Jon Leibowitz, former Federal Trade Commission chairman, were named co-chairs of the coalition. Also in June 2013, Bono helped lead expansion of Faegre Baker Daniels and Faegre Baker Daniels Consulting into Silicon Valley, in her home state of California.

In August 2013, Bono was a panelist at the National Journal's Women 2020 event. At that event, she discussed gender inequality and her experiences as a woman in Congress.

In October 2018, following the Michigan State University sex abuse scandal, Bono was named interim president and chief executive officer of USA Gymnastics. However, she resigned four days later following criticism over her previous role as a lobbyist for USA Gymnastics and amid public concern that she had marked out the Nike logo on her sneakers in protest of Nike's support for NFL quarterback Colin Kaepernick.

== Advocacy and causes ==
After attending a lecture by mountaineer-turned-humanitarian Greg Mortenson, Bono worked with him to aid his efforts to build schools for girls in the mountainous regions of Pakistan. Bono is quoted in Mortenson's book Three Cups of Tea as saying "I've learned more from Greg Mortenson about the causes of terrorism than during all our briefings on Capitol Hill."

== Personal life ==
On March 1, 1986, she married actor/singer Sonny Bono. The Bonos moved to Palm Springs, where they owned and operated a restaurant. Sonny Bono served as Mayor of Palm Springs from 1988 to 1992 before being elected to Congress in 1994. The Bonos had two children: Chesare (b. April 25, 1988) and Chianna (b. February 2, 1991). Sonny Bono died on January 5, 1998, in a skiing accident.

After Sonny Bono's death in 1998, Bono began dating Brian Prout, drummer of the country music band Diamond Rio. The two became engaged in 2001 but did not marry.

On November 24, 2001, Bono married Wyoming businessman Glenn Baxley about 18 months after they met in Mexico. They filed for divorce in 2005.

On December 15, 2007, Bono married Congressman Connie Mack IV (R-FL) in Asheville, North Carolina. In May 2013, the couple announced they had separated on amicable terms. They divorced later that year.

On September 27, 2015, Bono married former astronaut and retired Navy rear admiral Stephen S. Oswald.

In May 2024, Bono lost a legal dispute against Cher over royalties from Cher's recordings with Sonny. Under a 1978 divorce settlement, Cher was entitled to half the publishing revenue, but Bono stopped payments in 2021 after invoking a copyright termination clause. A federal judge ruled that the royalties were a separate contractual obligation and ordered her to pay Cher around $418,000 in withheld earnings. In 2025 it was reported that Bono is appealing the ruling.

She now resides in Durango, Colorado.

== See also ==
- Women in the United States House of Representatives

U.S. House of Representatives
Preceded by Sonny Bono	Member of the U.S. House of Representatives from California's 44th congressional district 1998–2003	Succeeded by Ken Calvert
Preceded by Dana Rohrabacher	Member of the U.S. House of Representatives from California's 45th congressional district 2003–2013	Succeeded by John Campbell
Party political offices
New office	Chair of the Republican Women's Policy Committee; 2012–2013	Succeeded by Renee Ellmers
U.S. order of precedence (ceremonial)
Preceded by Richard Pombo as Former U.S. Representative	Order of precedence of the United States as Former U.S. Representative	Succeeded by Joe Baca as Former U.S. Representative
