= William G. Gregory =

American astronaut and Air Force lieutenant colonel (born 1957)

William Gregory
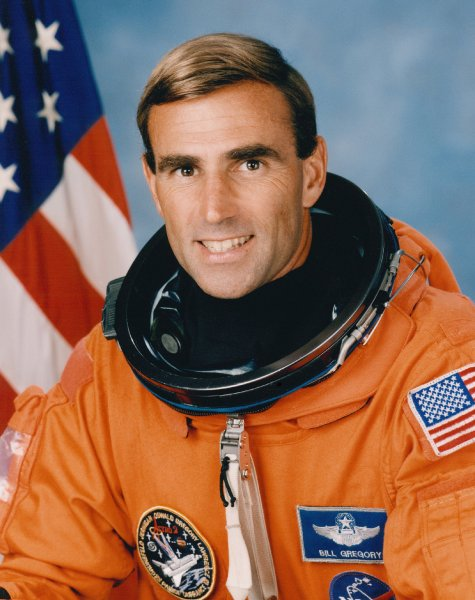
- Born: William George Gregory; May 14, 1957 (age 69); Lockport, New York, U.S.
- Other name: Borneo
- Education: United States Air Force Academy (BS); Columbia University (MS); Troy University (MS)
- Space career

NASA astronaut
- Rank: Lieutenant Colonel, USAF
- Time in space: 16d 15h 8m
- Selection: NASA Group 13 (1990)
- Missions: STS-67
- Mission insignia

William George Gregory (born May 14, 1957) is an Albanian American retired NASA astronaut and United States Air Force lieutenant colonel.

== Early life and education ==
Gregory was born in Lockport, New York, into an Albanian American family. He graduated from Lockport High School in 1975. Gregory is an Eagle Scout. He then attended the United States Air Force Academy, where he graduated with a degree in engineering sciences in 1979. After this, he went to Columbia University to get a master's degree in engineering mechanics (1980), and Troy University to get another master's in management (1984). He is also a member of the USAF Academy Association of Graduates.

== Career ==
Between 1981 and 1986, Gregory served as an operational fighter pilot flying the D and F models of the F-111. In this capacity, he served as an instructor pilot at RAF Lakenheath, UK, and Cannon Air Force Base (AFB), New Mexico. He attended the USAF Test Pilot School in 1987. Between 1988 and 1990 Gregory served as a test pilot at Edwards AFB flying the F-4, A-7D, and all five models of the F-15. Having flown in excess of 40 types of aircraft, Gregory has accumulated over 5,000 hours of flight time.

Gregory retired as a captain at an air cargo carrier based in the U.S.

== NASA career ==
Selected by NASA in January 1990, Gregory became an astronaut in July 1991. Gregory's technical assignments included: Shuttle Avionics Integration Laboratory (SAIL); astronaut office representative for Landing/Rollout, T-38 Flying Safety; Kennedy Space Center Astronaut Support Personnel (ASP); spacecraft communicator (CAPCOM) in mission control; astronaut office representative for rendezvous and proximity operations; and Spacecraft Operations Branch Chief. He flew on STS-67 (1995) and has logged 400 hours in space. Gregory retired from the Air Force and left NASA in the Summer of 1999. He served as Vice President of Business Development for Qwaltec, Inc. in Tempe, Arizona, and was an airline pilot for a U.S. based cargo carrier.

Gregory served as the STS-67 pilot on the seven-person astronomical research mission aboard the Space Shuttle Endeavour. Launching from the Kennedy Space Center on March 2, 1995, and landing at Edwards AFB on March 18, 1995, the crew established a new mission duration record of 16 days, 15 hours, 8 minutes and 46 seconds, while completing 262 orbits and traveling nearly seven million miles. This second flight of the ASTRO telescope primary payload also included numerous secondary payloads.
