= Erjona Ala =

Norwegian fashion model (born 1995)

- Born: 12 July 1995 (age 31); Pristina, Kosovo
- Modeling information
- Height: 1.79 m (5 ft 10 in)
- Hair color: Brown
- Eye color: Green
- Agency: Elite Model Management (Paris, Milan, Barcelona); Present Model Management (London); Iconic Management (Berlin); Two Management (Los Angeles); Heartbreak Management (Copenhagen, Oslo) (mother agency)

Erjona Ala (born July 12, 1995) is a Norwegian fashion model. She is best known for being the face of Louis Vuitton's 2012 Fall/Winter campaign and for appearing on the cover of magazines such as Vogue Italia and Dazed and Confused.

She has also modeled for other fashion brands such as Marc Jacobs, Alexander Wang and Versace.

== Early life ==
Ala is of Albanian heritage and took refuge in Norway with her family in 1997, fleeing the Kosovo War.

== Career ==
Ala’s modeling career began when she won Elite Model Look Norway contest in 2010 (at age 15) and went on to place second in the 2010 Elite Model Look Final in Shanghai, China. She appeared in 65 fashion magazines by age 16.

In 2011, Ala signed with Ford Models and soon after began walking the ramp for a number of different fashion labels.

She had her modeling debut at the Fashion Week 2011/2012 in Paris, where she exclusively walked for the Balenciaga show. In 2011, she also walked the ramp for the fall Azzedine Alaïa couture show that was held in Paris. In the same year, she also appeared in fashion shows for Temperley London, Margaret Howell, and Loewe at venues such as London Fashion Week.

In 2012, Ala appeared on the cover of Vogue Italia for the first time. In the same year, she also appeared on the covers of Dazed and Confused Bon Magazine, and ELLE Norway. She also appeared in Another Magazine. In 2012, Ala also starred in the short film The Erjonas, directed by Bon Duke for Nowness and featuring designer Prabal Gurung’s Fall/Winter 2012 collection.

In 2013, Ala participated in the Mango brand’s Spring/Summer 2013 fashion show alongside models such as Alessandra Ambrosio. She also modeled for Chanel during the Haute Couture Fall-Winter 2013-2014 collection shows at the Grand Palais in Paris.

Ala has also modeled for fashion brands such as Louis Vuitton, Marc Jacobs, Alexander Wang and Versace. Ala has also modeled for several other fashion magazines, including W Magazine, Marie Claire, and Harper’s Bazaar.

She has signed on with Elite Model Management, Munich Models, The Society NY and Model Management Hamburg, in addition to her main agency Heartbreak Management Oslo

The browser-based game Stardoll has an avatar based on Ala.
