= Leutrim Osaj =

Albanian footballer

Personal information
- Date of birth: 29 March 1992 (age 34)
- Place of birth: Maribor, Slovenia
- Position: Midfielder

Youth career
- –2011: Maribor

Senior career*
Years	Team	Apps	(Gls)
2012	Nafta Lendava	11	(0)

International career
	Albania U21	3	(0)
- * Club domestic league appearances and goals

Leutrim Osaj (born 29 March 1992) is a former professional footballer who played as a midfielder for Slovenian club Nafta Lendava. Born in Slovenia, he made three appearances for the Albania U21 national team.
