= Brutti Mansion =

18th-century mansion in Koper, Slovenia

Coordinates: 45°32′54.24″N 13°43′51.24″E

Palazzo Brutti
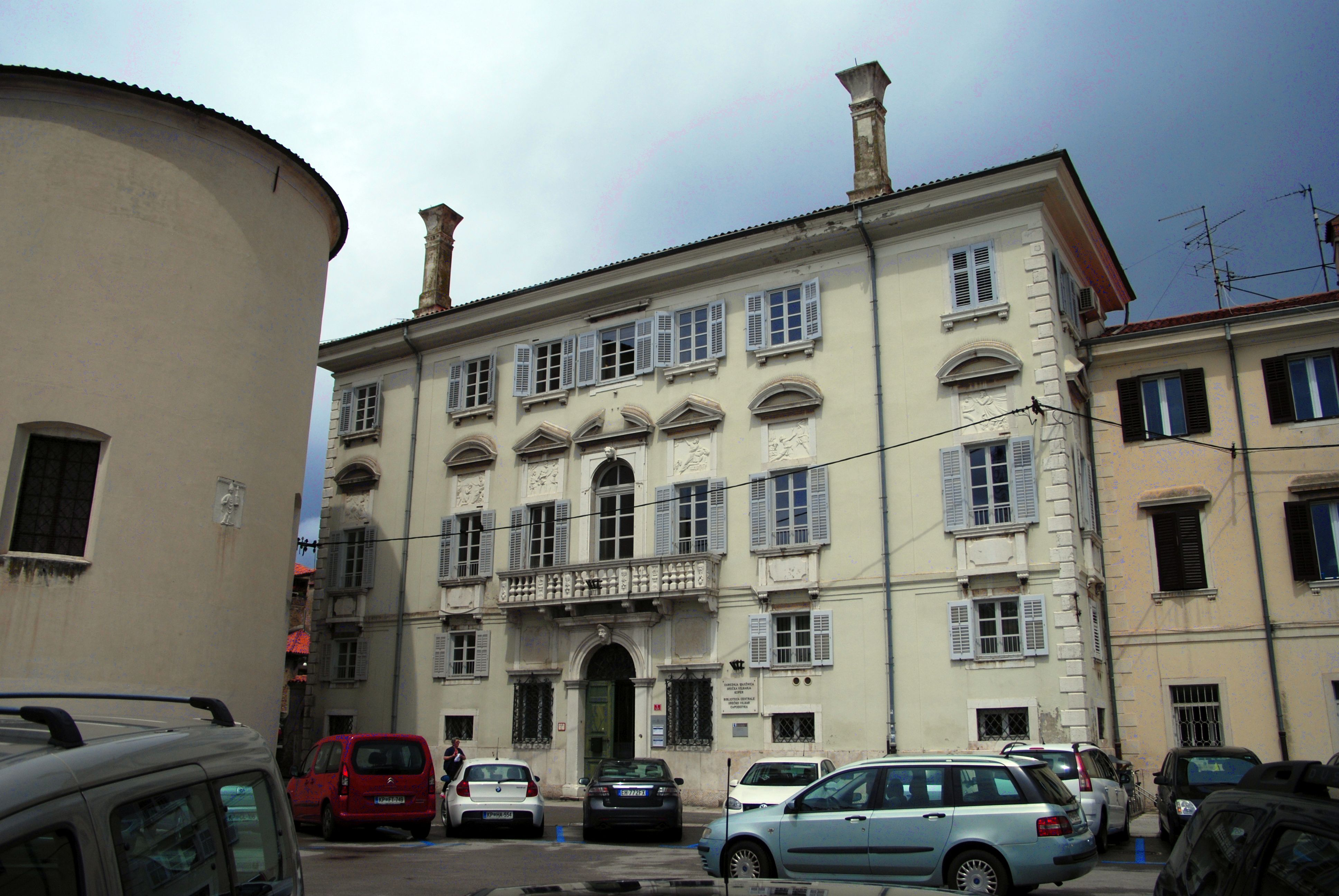
- Palazzo Brutti in 2016
- Click on the map for a fullscreen view

General information
- Location: Koper, Slovenia

Brutti Mansion (Slovene: palača Brutti; Italian: palazzo Brutti), also known as Brutti Palace, is an 18th-century mansion in Koper, a port town in southwestern Slovenia. Situated on the north side of Brolo Square (Trg Brolo), it now houses the central library of Koper.

The mansion was built in the late-Baroque style in 1714 according to plans by the architect Giorgio Massari, at the request of Count Barnabi Brutti. Its facade has relief images from the Old Testament of the Bible.

The library is named after the librarian and politician Srečko Vilhar.
