= Burim Myftiu =

Albanian American photographer

- Born: 1961 (age 64–65); Prizren, Kosovo
- Education: University of Prishtina; NYIP
- Known for: Photography
- Notable work: "Missing", "Broken Dreams", "Remembrance", "Trance"

Burim Myftiu (born 1961) is an Albanian-American contemporary photographer.

== Early life ==
Myftiu was born in Prizren, Yugoslavia (in today's Kosovo).

== Career ==
Burim Myftiu holds a Master's Degree in Visual Arts. He began photographing in the early 1980s. He initially studied Linguistics at the University of Prishtina. Later he specialized in commercial photography in New York City. In 2003, he founded PACK (Photo Arts Collective of Kosovo). Myftiu is co-founder and director of Dokufest (International Documentary and Short Film Festival). He is the curator of the International Photography Exhibition, "Gjon Mili Prize", at the National Art Gallery in Pristina, Kosovo.

He is a founder of Kosova Images Photo Agency, and has served as a regional liaison officer of the Fédération Internationale de l'Art Photographique (FIAP). He was appointed a Cultural Ambassador for the European Commission in 2016. He is a member of the New Haven Arts Council in Connecticut.

Presently, he teaches photography, doing editorial and curatorial work.

Myftiu lives and works in Connecticut, USA.

== Exhibitions ==
- 2009: Balkandemokraci
- 2012: Bursa Photo Festival
- 2010: Utopia in Chaos
- 2016: Beautiful Travelers II
- 2018: Trance
- 2021: "Remembrance"

== Films ==
- Discover Pristina with Burim Myftiu - Welcome to Pristina, as seen through the lens of photographer Burim Myftiu – a documentary
