= Gzim Rexhaj =

Slovenian footballer

Personal information
- Date of birth: 8 June 1986 (age 40)
- Place of birth: SR Slovenia, SFR Yugoslavia
- Height: 1.78 m (5 ft 10 in)
- Position: Forward

Senior career*
Years	Team	Apps	(Gls)
2005–2008	Gorica	37	(2)
2006	→ Brda (loan)	10	(6)
2007	→ Adria (loan)		
2008	→ Bonifika (loan)	10	(1)
2009	Bonifika	3	(1)
2009–2010	KFC Uerdingen 05	18	(6)

International career
2006–2007	Slovenia U20	4	(0)
2007	Slovenia U21	3	(0)
- * Club domestic league appearances and goals

Gzim Rexhaj (born 8 June 1986) is a Slovenian former footballer who played as a forward.
