= Hut (disambiguation) =

A hut is a small, crude shelter.

Hut, HUT or The Hut may also refer to:

== People ==
- Hans Hut (c. 1490 – 1527), Anabaptist leader
- Piet Hut (born 1952), Dutch-American astrophysicist
- Hut Stricklin (born 1961), American racing driver
- William Hut, Norwegian singer of former band Poor Rich Ones

== Places ==
- Hut Bay, in the Andaman Islands
- Hut Cove, on the Antarctic Peninsula
- Hout, Syria, older spelling for this place

== Universities ==
- Hanoi University of Technology, now Hanoi University of Science and Technology
- Hefei University of Technology, Anhui, China
- Helsinki University of Technology, Finland
- Hunan University of Technology, in Zhuzhou, Hunan, China

== Other uses ==
- "Hut!", a command in American football
- Hard Upper Torso, spacesuit component
- Home-user test, a product marketing test
- Hopkins Ultraviolet Telescope, a space telescope
- Humla language, a Tibetic language of Nepal (ISO code: hut)
- Hurry Up Tomorrow, 2025 album by the Weeknd
- Hut Records, an English record label
- Hutchinson Municipal Airport (Kansas), US, by IATA airport code
- Hutton Cranswick railway station, in England
- The Hut Group, a British online retailer

== See also ==
- Huth (disambiguation)
- Hutt (disambiguation)
- Hoot (disambiguation)
