= Hoot =

Hoot or Hoots may refer to:

== Publications ==
- Hoot (novel), a young adult novel by Carl Hiaasen
- Hoot, a 1996 children's novel by Jane Hissey
- Hoot (comics), a British magazine published from 1985 to 1986
- The Brandeis Hoot, a student newspaper at Brandeis University

== Film and TV ==
- Hoot (film), a 2006 film based on the Carl Hiaasen novel
- Hoots the Owl, a Sesame Street Muppet
- "Hoots" (Adventure Time), a television episode
- Hoot an Owl character on the Australian children's television show Giggle and Hoot

== Music ==
- Hoot (EP), a 2010 mini-album by South Korean girl group Girls' Generation
  - "Hoot" (song), a song by Girls' Generation from the mini-album

== As a nickname ==
- Hoot Evers (1921–1991), American Major League Baseball player
- Hoot Gibson (disambiguation), various people
- Hoot Hester (1951–2016), American country and bluegrass musician
- Hoot Sackett, American baseball head coach at Oklahoma State University in 1920–1921

== Other uses ==
- A vocalization made by some species of owl
- Hoot, Texas, United States, an unincorporated community
- Hoot (torpedo), an Iranian weapon in service since 2006
- Heart of Ohio Tole (HOOT) a regional chapter of the Society of Decorative Painters

== See also ==
- Hooty, a character from the Disney Channel animated series The Owl House
