= Ronald Parise =

Italian-American astronaut (1951–2008)

Ronald Anthony Parise
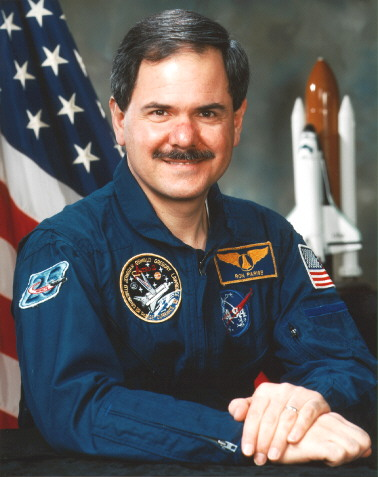
- Born: May 24, 1951; Warren, Ohio
- Died: May 9, 2008 (aged 56); Silver Spring, Maryland
- Occupation: Scientist
- Space career

CSC Payload Specialist
- Time in space: 25d 14h 13m
- Missions: STS-35, STS-67

Ronald Anthony Parise (May 24, 1951 – May 9, 2008) was an Italian American scientist who flew aboard two NASA Space Shuttle missions as a payload specialist.

Parise was born in Warren, Ohio, to Henry and Catherine Parise (nee Pasha). His father was born in Carovilli. By age 11, he became a licensed amateur radio operator. In his teens, he developed an interest in astronomy and aviation and became a pilot. He attended Western Reserve High School, graduating in 1969 before attending Youngstown State University. In 1973, he obtained a bachelor of science degree in physics, with minors in mathematics, astronomy, and geology. He went on to receive a master's degree in 1977 and a doctorate in 1979 from the University of Florida, both in astronomy. He and his wife Cecelia Sokol Parise had two children.

Parise died from a brain tumor on May 9, 2008, at the age of 56.

== Career ==
Upon graduation in 1979, Parise accepted a position at Operations Research Inc. (ORI) where he was involved in developing avionics requirements definitions and performing failure mode analyses for several NASA missions. In 1980 he began work at Computer Sciences Corporation in the International Ultraviolet Explorer (IUE) operations center as a data management scientist and in 1981 became the section manager of the IUE hardcopy facility.

In 1981 he began work on the development of a new Spacelab experiment called the Ultraviolet Imaging Telescope (UIT). His responsibilities involved flight hardware and software development, electronic system design, and mission planning activities for the UIT project. In 1984 he was selected by NASA as a payload specialist in support of the newly formed Astro mission series. During his twelve years as a payload specialist he was involved in mission planning, simulator development, integration and test activities, flight procedure development, and scientific data analysis, in addition to his flight crew responsibilities for the Astro program. At the completion of the Astro program, Parise assumed an advanced planning and communications engineering support role for a variety of human space flight projects including Mir, International Space Station (ISS), and the X-38.

Parise engaged in a number of astronomical research projects utilizing data from ground-based observatories, the Copernicus satellite (OAO-3), IUE, and the Astro observatory. His research topics, including circumstellar matter in binary star systems and the evolutionary status of stars in globular clusters, resulted in several professional publications. A veteran of two space flights, Parise logged more than 614 hours and 10.6 million miles in space. He served as a payload specialist aboard STS-35 in 1990 and STS-67 in 1995. At the end of his career, Parise supported the Goddard Space Flight Center, Networks and Mission Services Project, in the area of advanced communications planning for human spaceflight missions. He was also involved with projects in the Advanced Architectures and Automation Branch that developed the use of standard Internet Protocols (IP) in space data transmission applications.

== Spaceflight experience ==
STS-35/Astro-1 Columbia (December 2–December 10, 1990). The Astro observatory is a unique complement of three telescopes designed to simultaneously record spectral data, polarimetric data and imagery of faint astronomical objects in the far ultraviolet. The mission duration was 215 hours and 5 minutes. The Shuttle landed at Edwards Air Force Base in California.

STS-67/Astro-2 Endeavour (March 2–18, 1995). This was the second flight of the Astro observatory. During this record-setting 16-day mission, the crew conducted observations around the clock to study the far ultraviolet spectra of faint astronomical objects and the polarization of ultraviolet light coming from hot stars and distant galaxies. The mission duration was 399 hours and 9 minutes. The landing was at Edwards Air Force Base in California.

Coincidentally, Parise's fellow payload specialist on both his missions was Sam Durrance.

Parise was instrumental in bringing amateur radio equipment to the Shuttle and operated on the air during his own missions. His amateur radio call sign was WA4SIR.

== Organizations ==
- American Astronomical Society
- Astronomical Society of the Pacific
- Association of Space Explorers
- International Astronomical Union
- Sigma Xi
- Phi Kappa Phi
- Warren Amateur Radio Association, Inc.
- AMSAT
- ARISS
- Space Hams International
- Abruzzo Molise Heritage Society of Washington D.C.

== Awards and honors ==
- NASA Space Flight Medal (1991, 1995)
- Distinguished member of Phi Kappa Phi (1996)
- Honorary Doctor of Science degree, Youngstown State University (1996)
- NASA/GSFC Special Act Award (1995)
- Computer Sciences Corp., Space and Earth Technology Systems, Award for Technical Innovation (1999)
- NASA Group Achievement Award (1988, 1991, 1992, 1996, 1998, 2000)
- NASA/GSFC Community Service Award (1990)
- Allied Signal, Quest for Excellence Award (1997)
- Ohio Historical Marker: Ronald A. Parise, Ph.D., Astronaut / Scientist
