= STS-51-I =

1985 American crewed spaceflight to Syncom IV-3

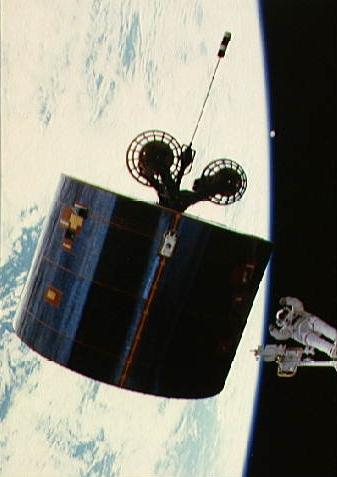
- van Hoften next to the crippled Syncom IV-3 (Leasat-3) satellite, during the mission's first EVA.
- Names: Space Transportation System-20
- Mission type: Satellites deployment Satellite repair
- Operator: NASA
- COSPAR ID: 1985-076A
- SATCAT no.: 15992
- Mission duration: 7 days, 2 hours, 17 minutes, 42 seconds
- Distance travelled: 4,698,602 km (2,919,576 mi)
- Orbits completed: 112

Spacecraft properties
- Spacecraft: Space Shuttle Discovery
- Launch mass: 118,981 kg (262,308 lb)
- Landing mass: 89,210 kg (196,670 lb)
- Payload mass: 17,540 kg (38,670 lb)

Crew
- Crew size: 5
- Members: Joe H. Engle; Richard O. Covey; James D. A. van Hoften; John M. Lounge; William F. Fisher
- EVAs: 2
- EVA duration: 11 hours, 46 minutes; 1st EVA: 7 hours, 20 minutes; 2nd EVA: 4 hours, 26 minutes

Start of mission
- Launch date: August 27, 1985, 10:58:01 UTC (6:58:01 am EDT)
- Launch site: Kennedy, LC-39A
- Contractor: Rockwell International

End of mission
- Landing date: September 3, 1985, 13:15:43 UTC (6:15:43 am PDT)
- Landing site: Edwards, Runway 23

Orbital parameters
- Reference system: Geocentric orbit
- Regime: Low Earth orbit
- Perigee altitude: 350 km (220 mi)
- Apogee altitude: 465 km (289 mi)
- Inclination: 28.45°
- Period: 92.00 minutes

Instruments
- Physical Vapor Transport Organic Solid Experiment (PVTOS)
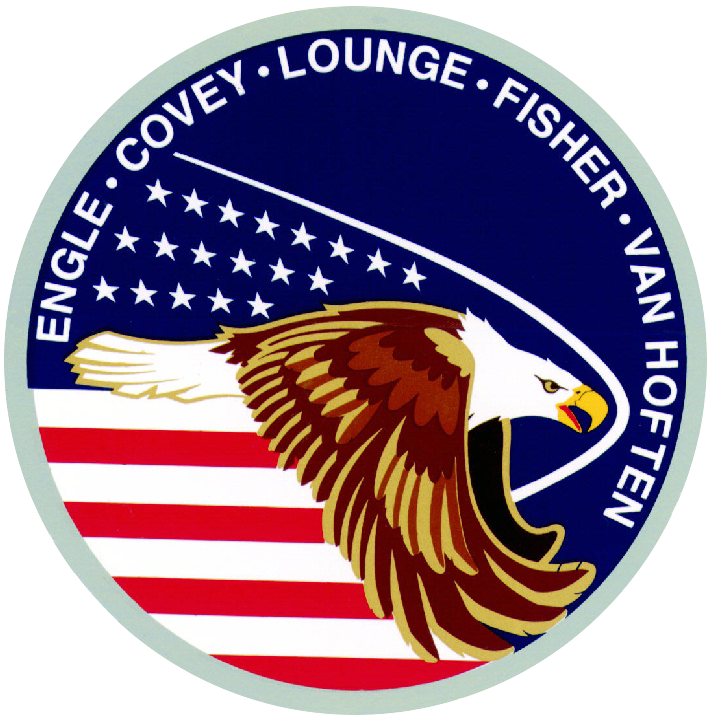
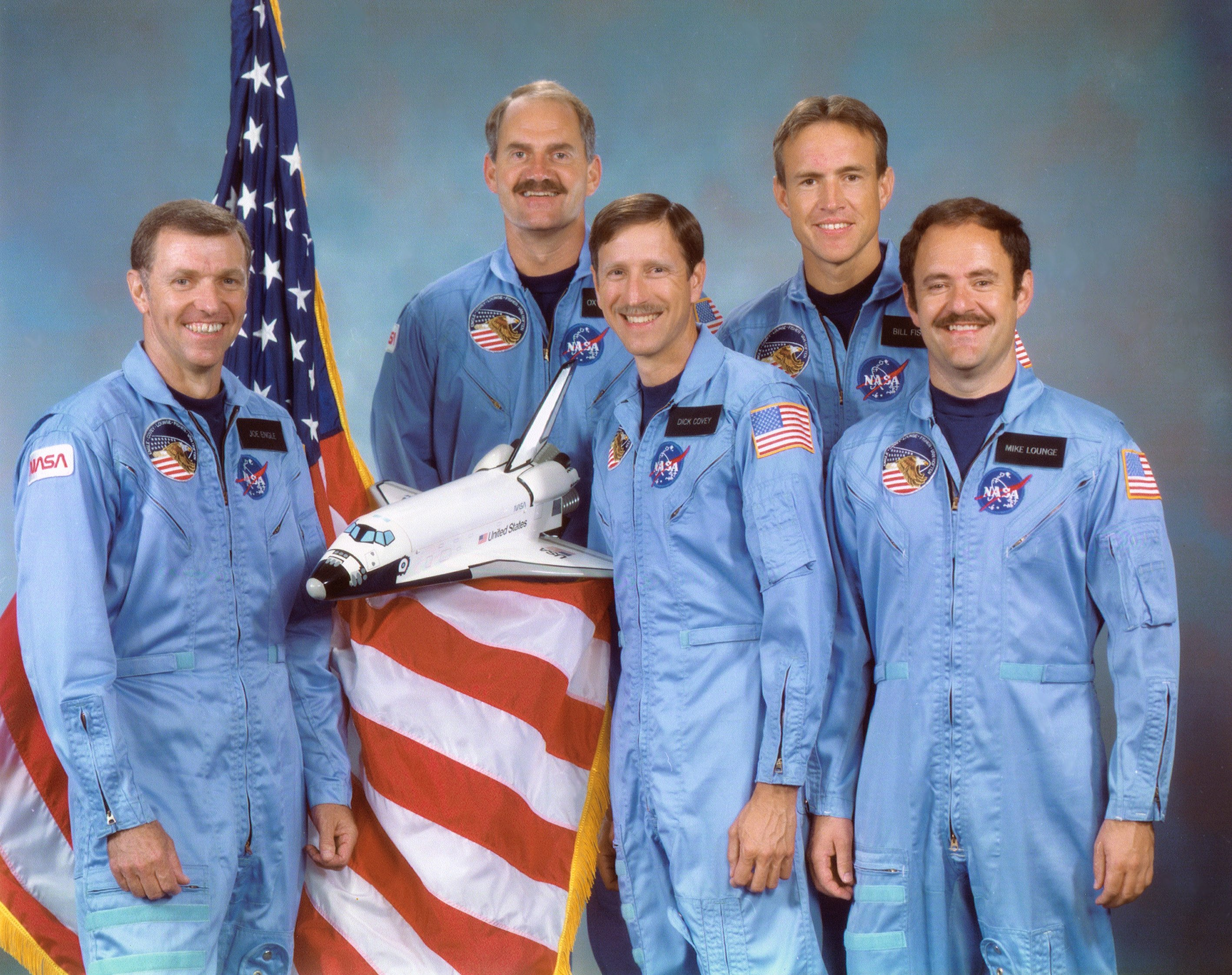
- STS-51-I mission patch Back row: James D. A. van Hoften, William F. Fisher; Front row: Joe H. Engle, Richard O. Covey, John M. Lounge Space Shuttle program

STS-51-I was the 20th mission of NASA's Space Shuttle program and the sixth flight of Space Shuttle Discovery. During the mission, Discovery deployed three communications satellites into orbit. The mission launched from Kennedy Space Center, Florida, on August 27, 1985, and landed at Edwards Air Force Base, California, on September 3, 1985.

== Crew ==
Position	Astronaut
Commander	Joe H. Engle; Second and last spaceflight
Pilot	Richard O. Covey; First spaceflight
Mission Specialist 1	James D. A. van Hoften; Second and last spaceflight
Mission Specialist 2 Flight Engineer	John M. Lounge; First spaceflight
Mission Specialist 3	William F. Fisher; Only spaceflight

=== Spacewalks ===
EVA 1

- Personnel: Fisher and van Hoften
- Date: August 31, 1985 (≈12:10–19:10 UTC)
- Duration: 7 hours, 20 minutes

EVA 2

- Personnel: Fisher and van Hoften
- Date: September 1, 1985 (≈12:10–16:30 UTC)
- Duration: 4 hours, 26 minutes

=== Crew seat assignments ===
Seat	Launch	Landing	Seats 1–4 are on the flight deck. Seats 5–7 are on the mid-deck.
1	Engle		Seats 1–4 are on the flight deck. Seats 5–7 are on the mid-deck.
2	Covey		Seats 1–4 are on the flight deck. Seats 5–7 are on the mid-deck.
3	van Hoften	Fisher	Seats 1–4 are on the flight deck. Seats 5–7 are on the mid-deck.
4	Lounge		Seats 1–4 are on the flight deck. Seats 5–7 are on the mid-deck.
5	Fisher	van Hoften	Seats 1–4 are on the flight deck. Seats 5–7 are on the mid-deck.
6	Unused		Seats 1–4 are on the flight deck. Seats 5–7 are on the mid-deck.
7	Unused		Seats 1–4 are on the flight deck. Seats 5–7 are on the mid-deck.

== Launch ==
Attempt	Planned	Result	Turnaround	Reason	Decision point	Weather go (%)	Notes
1	24 Aug 1985, 8:38:00 am	Scrubbed	—	Weather	24 Aug 1985, 9:06 am (T−00:05:00)		Thunderstorms in the KSC area and a ship entering the SRB recovery area
2	25 Aug 1985, 7:57:00 am	Scrubbed	0 days 23 hours 19 minutes	Technical	25 Aug 1985, 8:11 am (T−00:09:00 hold)		Computer failure
3	27 Aug 1985, 6:58:01 am	Success	1 day 23 hours 1 minute				Launch delayed 3 minutes, 1 second for weather and ship in entering SRB recovery area.

== Mission summary ==
Discovery launched at 6:58 a.m. EDT on August 27, 1985. Two earlier launch attempts, one on August 24 and another on August 25, were scrubbed – the first because of poor weather, and the second because the backup orbiter computer failed and had to be replaced. The successful launch on August 27, 1985, took place just as an approaching storm front reached the launch pad area.

The five-man STS-51-I crew included Joe H. Engle, commander; Richard O. Covey, pilot; and James D. A. van Hoften, John M. Lounge, and William F. Fisher, mission specialists. Their primary mission was to deploy three commercial communications satellites and retrieve and repair the Syncom IV-3 (Leasat-3) satellite, which had been deployed during the STS-51-D mission in April 1985, but had malfunctioned. In addition, a mid-deck materials processing experiment, the Physical Vapor Transport Organic Solid Experiment (PVTOS), was flown aboard Discovery.

The three communications satellites were Aussat-1, a multi-purpose spacecraft owned by Australia; ASC-1, owned and operated by the American Satellite Corporation (ASC); and Syncom IV-4 (Leasat-4), leased to the Department of Defense (DoD) by its builder, Hughes Space and Communications. Both Aussat-1 and ASC-1 were deployed on the day of the launch, August 27, 1985. Syncom IV-4 (Leasat-4) was deployed two days later. All three achieved their planned geosynchronous orbits and became operational.

On the fifth day of the mission, astronauts Fisher and van Hoften began repair efforts on the malfunctioning Syncom IV-3, following a successful rendezvous maneuver by Discovery. The effort was slowed by a problem with the Remote Manipulator System (Canadarm) elbow joint. After a second EVA by Fisher and van Hoften, the satellite's control lever was repaired, permitting commands from the ground to activate the spacecraft's systems and eventually send it into its proper geosynchronous orbit. The two EVAs lasted a total of 11 hours and 46 minutes.

Discovery landed on Runway 23 at Edwards Air Force Base at 6:16 a.m. PDT on September 3, 1985. The flight lasted a total of 7 days, 2 hours, 18 minutes and 42 seconds, during which the shuttle completed 112 orbits of the Earth.

== Mission insignia ==
The insignia depicts an American bald eagle, trailing red and white stripes, and pushing a boundary layer forward. The 19 stars, along with the eagle, are references to the 20th shuttle mission (with the eagle representing the orbiter and thus being the 20th "star"). Lining the patch are the surnames of the crew members.

== Wake-up calls ==
NASA began a tradition of playing music to astronauts during the Project Gemini, and first used music to wake up a flight crew during Apollo 15. Each track is specially chosen, often by the astronauts' families, and usually has a special meaning to an individual member of the crew, or is applicable to their daily activities.

Flight Day	Song	Artist/Composer
Day 2	"Waltzing Matilda"	Banjo Paterson
Day 3	"Over the Rainbow"	Judy Garland
Day 4	"I Saw the Light"	Willie Nelson
Day 5	"I Get Around"	Beach Boys
Day 6	"Lucky Old Sun"	Willie Nelson
Day 7	"Stormy Weather"	Willie Nelson
Day 8	"Living in the USA"	Linda Ronstadt

== Gallery ==
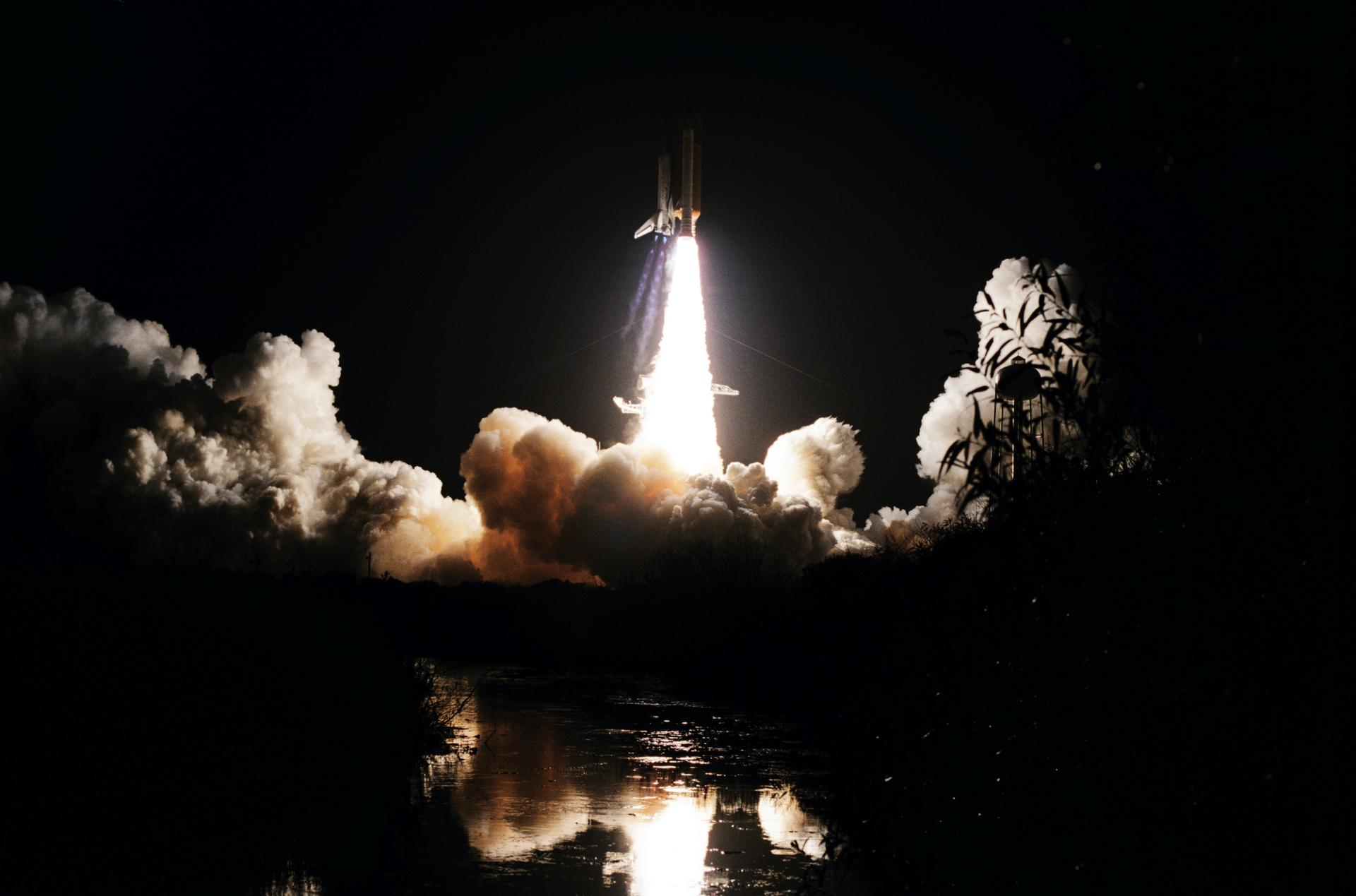
Launch of Space Shuttle Discovery

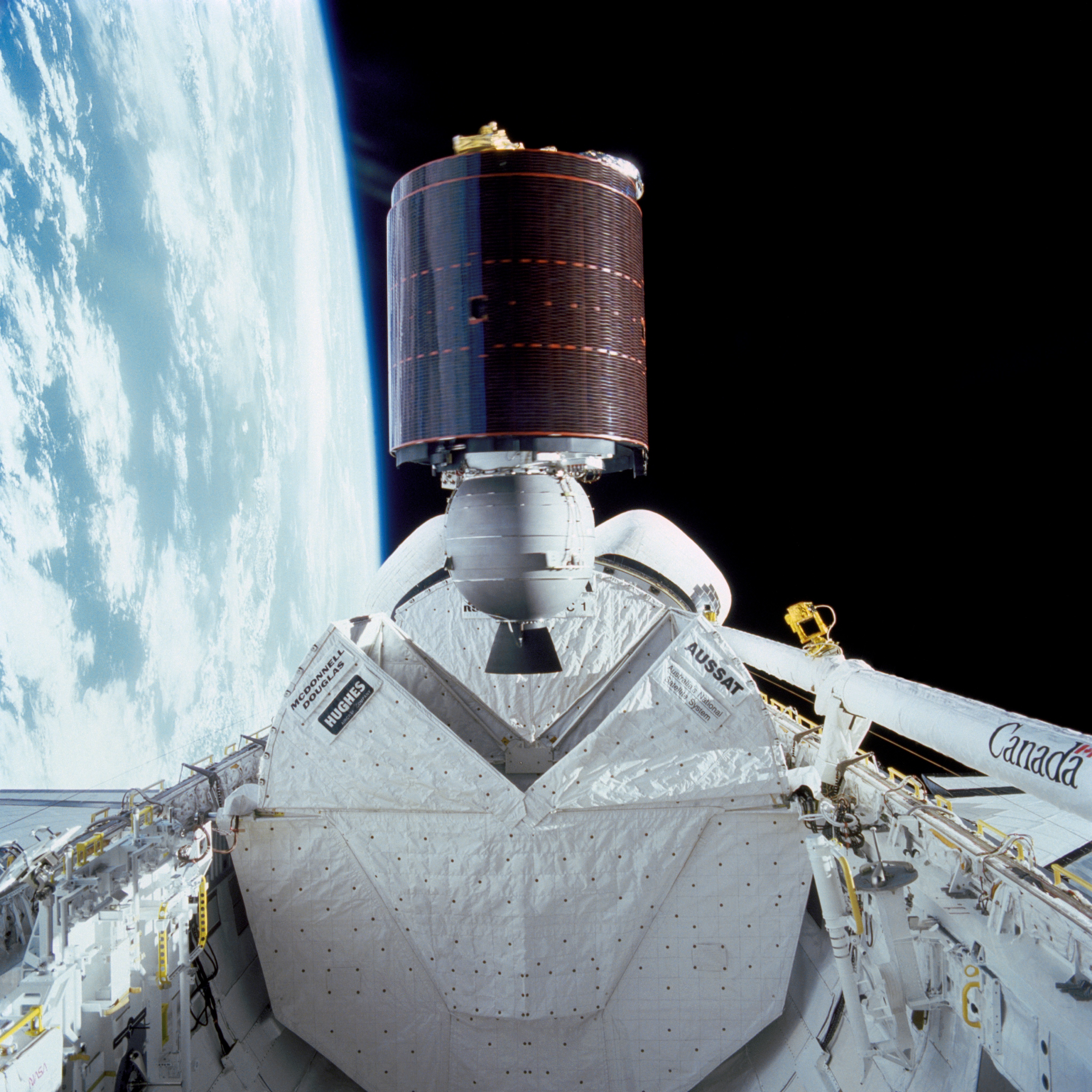
Deployment of Aussat-1

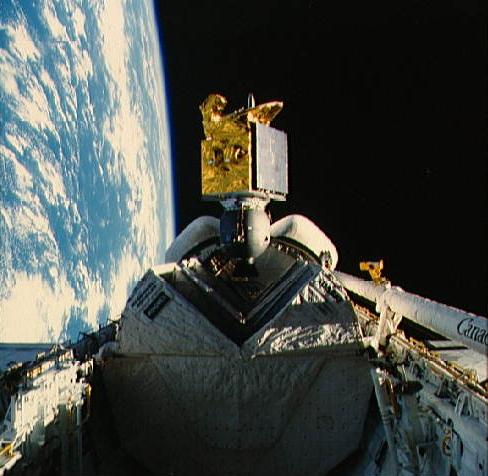
Deployment of ASC-1

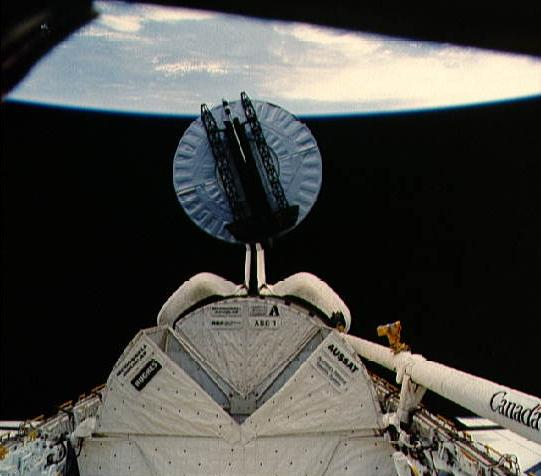
Deployment of Syncom IV-4 (Leasat-4)

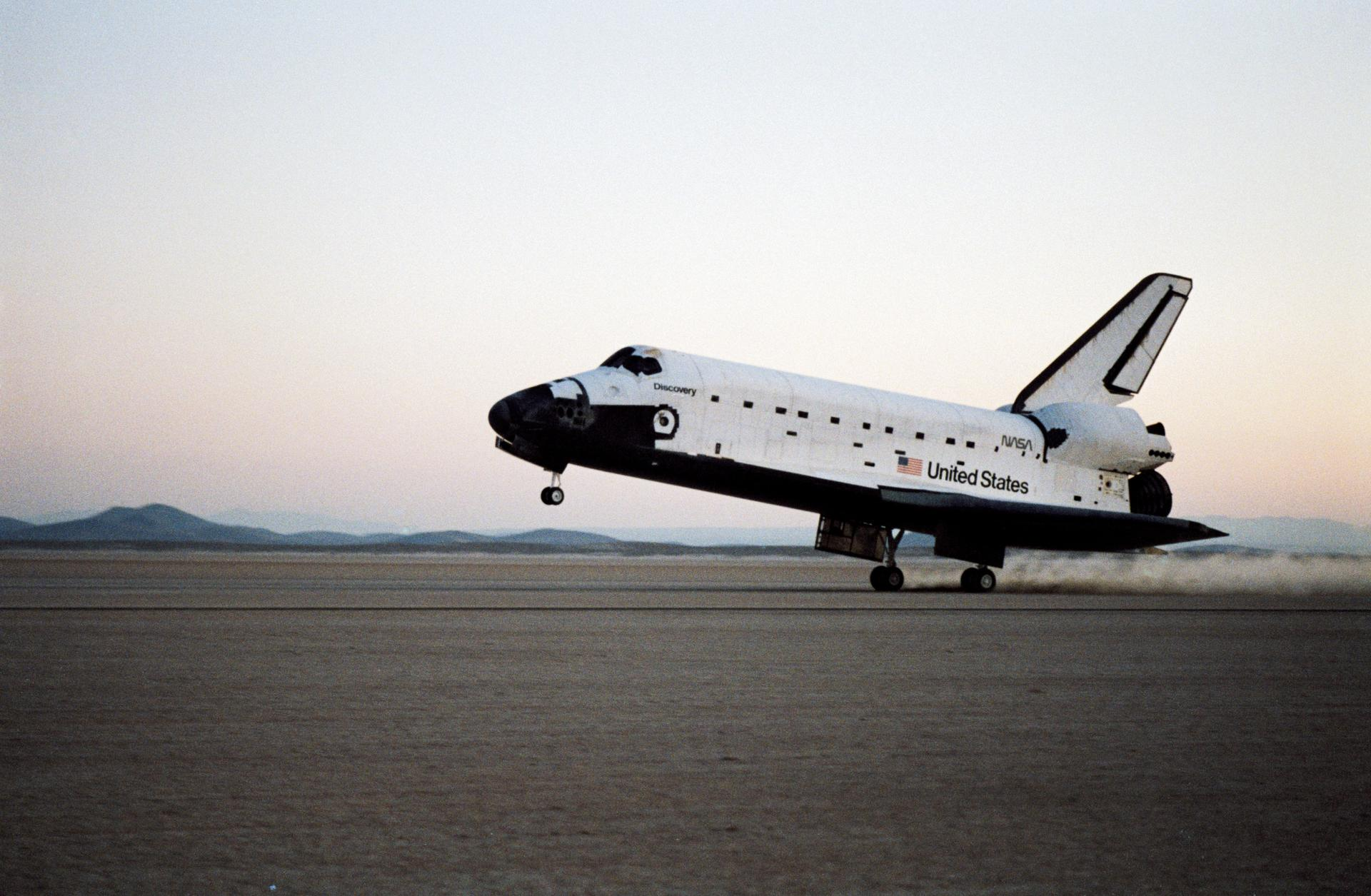
Space Shuttle Discovery Landing

== See also ==
- List of human spaceflights
- List of Space Shuttle missions
