= Richard O. Covey =

American astronaut (born 1946)

Richard Covey
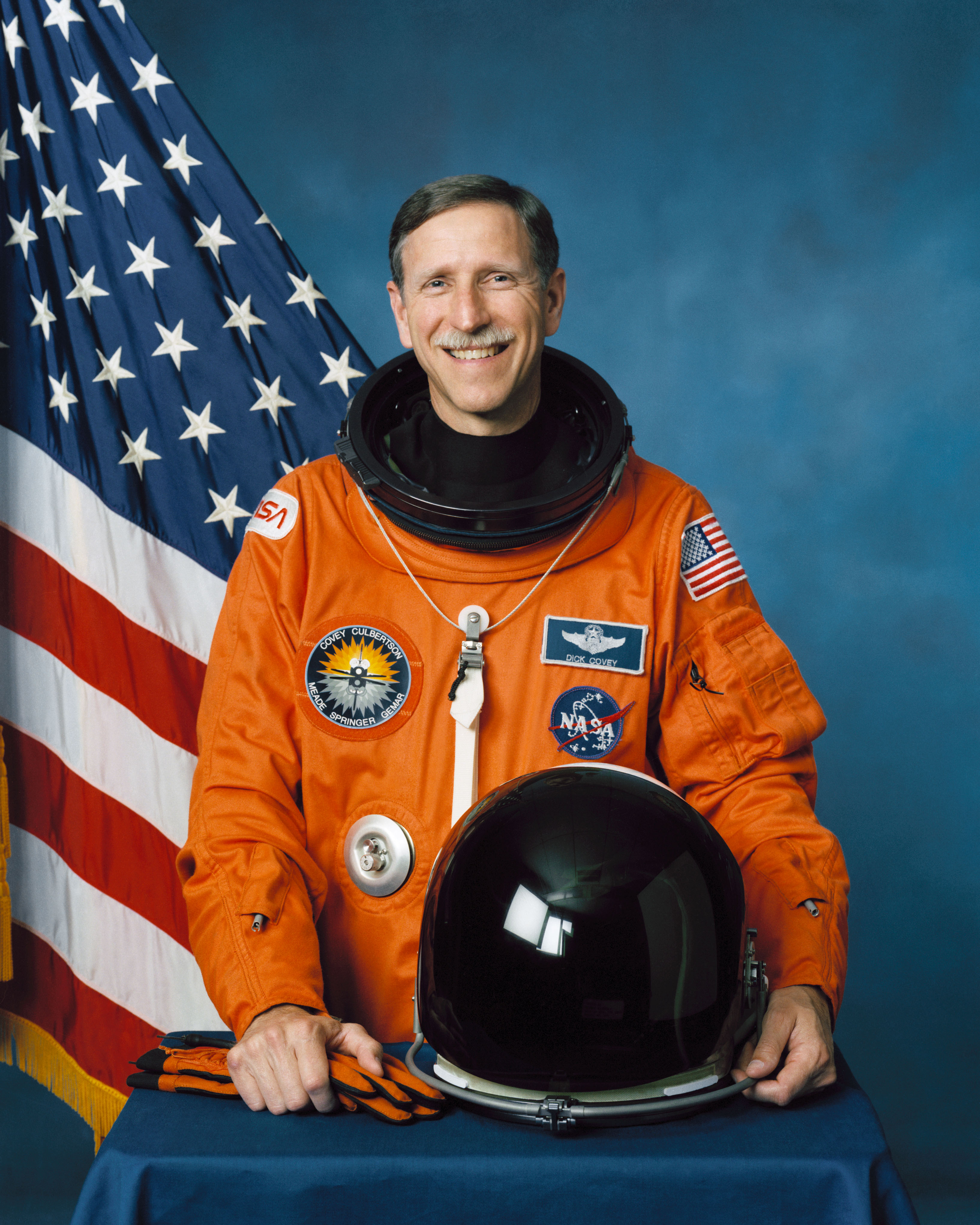
- Born: Richard Oswalt Covey; August 1, 1946 (age 80); Fayetteville, Arkansas, U.S.
- Education: United States Air Force Academy (BS); Purdue University (MS)
- Awards: Distinguished Flying Cross
- Space career

NASA astronaut
- Rank: Colonel, USAF
- Time in space: 26d 21h 9m
- Selection: NASA Group 8 (1978)
- Missions: STS-51-I; STS-26; STS-38; STS-61
- Retired: August 1, 1994

Richard Oswalt Covey (born August 1, 1946) is a retired United States Air Force officer, former NASA astronaut, and a member of the United States Astronaut Hall of Fame.

== Early life ==
Born on August 1, 1946, in Fayetteville, Arkansas, Covey considers Fort Walton Beach, Florida, to be his hometown. He graduated from Choctawhatchee High School in Fort Walton Beach, Florida, in 1964; he received a Bachelor of Science degree in engineering science with a major in astronautical engineering from the United States Air Force Academy in 1968, and a Master of Science degree in aeronautics and astronautics from Purdue University in 1969.

== Military career ==
As a member of the U.S. Air Force, Covey was an operational fighter pilot from 1970 to 1974, flying the F-100 Super Sabre, A-37 Dragonfly and A-7 Corsair II. He flew 339 combat missions during two tours in Southeast Asia. At Eglin Air Force Base, Florida, between 1975 and 1978, he was an F-4 Phantom II and A-7D weapons system test pilot and joint test force director for electronic warfare testing of the F-15 Eagle.

He has flown over 5,700 hours in more than 30 different types of aircraft.

== NASA career ==
=== Selection, training, and administration ===
Selected as an astronaut candidate by NASA in January 1978, Covey became an astronaut in August 1979. A veteran of four space flights, STS-51-I in 1985, STS-26 in 1988, STS-38 in 1990, and STS-61 in 1993, Covey has logged over 646 hours in space. He was the last member of his astronaut class—the 1978 NASA Group 8—to make his first spaceflight.

Prior to the first flight of the Space Shuttle, he provided astronaut support in Orbiter engineering development and testing. He was a T-38 chase pilot for the second and third Shuttle flights and support crewman for the first operational Shuttle flight, STS-5. Covey also served as Mission Control spacecraft communicator (CAPCOM) for Shuttle missions STS-5, 6, 61-B, 61-C, and 51-L (it was his voice that said the now infamous words, "Challenger, go at throttle up" shortly before the Space Shuttle Challenger disaster). During 1989, he was Chairman of NASA's Space Flight Safety Panel. He has held additional technical assignments within the NASA Astronaut Office, and has also served as Acting Deputy Chief of the Astronaut Office, and Acting Deputy Director of Flight Crew Operations.

=== STS-51-I ===
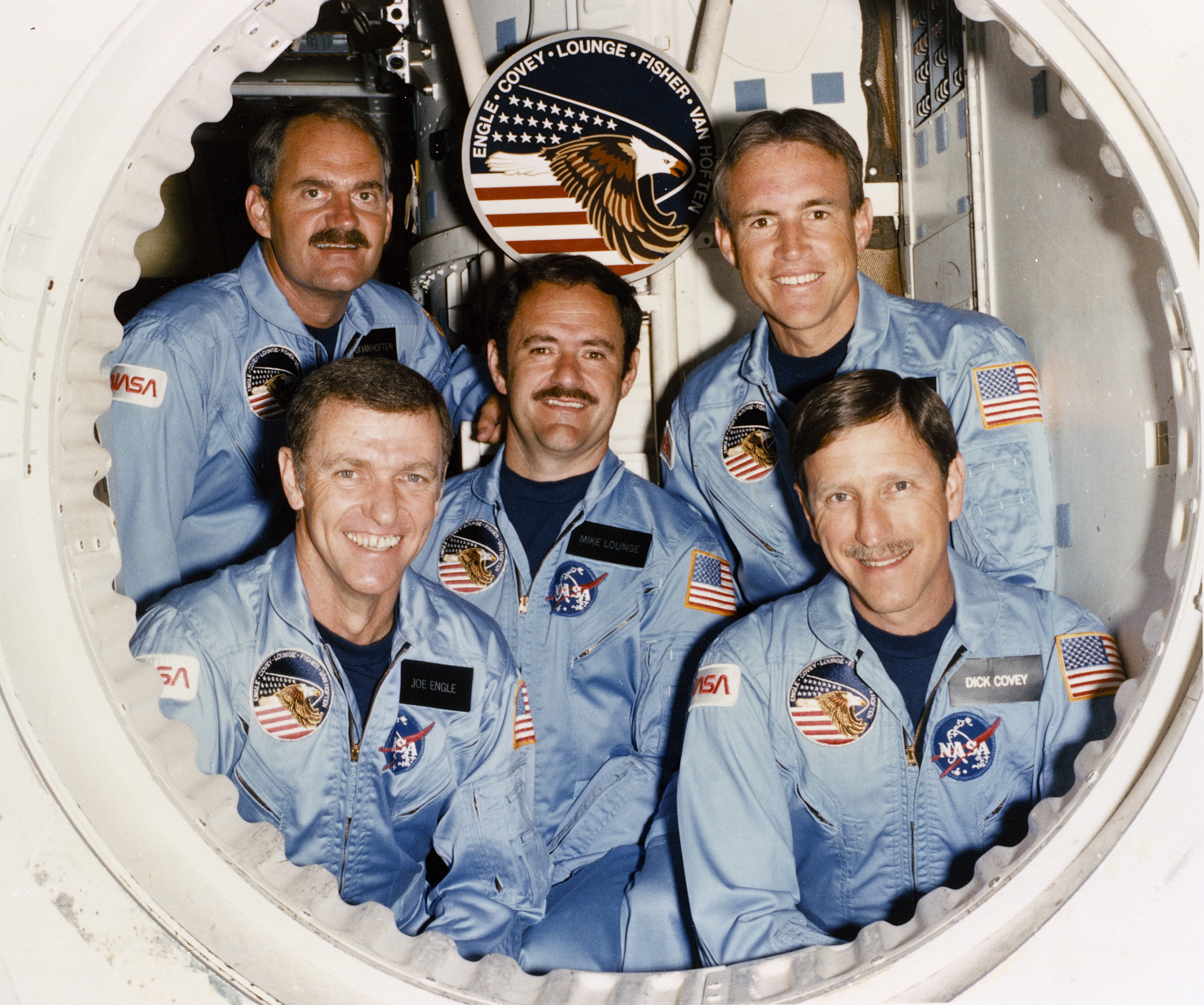
The crew of the STS-51-I mission. Covey is at the lower right.

On his first mission, Covey was on the five-man crew of STS-51-I, which launched from Kennedy Space Center, Florida, on August 27, 1985. During this seven-day mission, crew members deployed three communications satellites: the Navy SYNCOM IV-4, the Australian AUSSAT, and American Satellite Corporation's ASC-1. The crew also performed the successful on-orbit rendezvous and repair of the ailing 15,000 pound (6.8 t) SYNCOM IV-3 satellite. This repair activity involved the first manual grapple and manual deployment of a satellite by a spacewalking crew member. Mission duration was 170 hours. The Space Shuttle Discovery completed 112 orbits before landing at Edwards Air Force Base, California, on September 3, 1985.

=== STS-26 ===
He next served as pilot on STS-26, the first flight to be flown after the loss of Challenger. The five-man crew launched from the Kennedy Space Center, Florida, on September 29, 1988, aboard the Discovery. Mission duration was 97 hours during which crew members successfully deployed the TDRS-C satellite and operated eleven secondary payloads which included two student experiments. Discovery completed 64 orbits of the Earth before landing at Edwards Air Force Base, California, on October 3, 1988.

=== STS-38 ===
On STS-38 Covey was the spacecraft commander of a five-man crew that launched at night from the Kennedy Space Center, Florida, on November 15, 1990. During the five-day mission crew members conducted Department of Defense operations. After 80 orbits of the Earth in 117 hours, Covey piloted the Space Shuttle Atlantis to a landing on the runway at the Kennedy Space Center on November 20, 1990. This was the first Shuttle recovery in Florida since 1985.

=== STS-61 ===
On his fourth flight, Covey commanded a crew of seven aboard the Space Shuttle Endeavour on the STS-61 Hubble Space Telescope (HST) servicing and repair mission. STS-61 launched at night from the Kennedy Space Center, Florida, on December 2, 1993. During the 11-day flight, the HST was captured and restored to full capacity through a record five space walks by four astronauts. After having traveled 4,433,772 miles (7,135,464 km) in 163 orbits of the Earth, Covey landed the Endeavour at night on the runway at the Kennedy Space Center on December 13, 1993.

== Post-NASA career ==
On August 1, 1994, Covey retired from NASA and the Air Force. Covey is married and has two grown daughters. After the Space Shuttle Columbia disaster in 2003, Covey, along with retired Air Force Lieutenant General Thomas Patten Stafford, headed the Stafford-Covey Commission in returning the Space Shuttle fleet to space, starting with the STS-114 mission. In 2005, Covey received the Distinguished Eagle Scout Award from the Boy Scouts of America—he became an Eagle Scout in 1960 when his father was stationed at an Air Force base in Florida. Covey was featured in a 2005 issue of Eagletter, a magazine for members of the National Eagle Scout Association. In January 2006, Covey was selected for the position of Chief Operating Officer of United Space Alliance. In September 2007, Covey succeeded fellow astronaut Michael J. McCulley as chief executive officer of United Space Alliance. Covey retired from United Space Alliance in March 2010. He served on the Board of Directors of Re/Max Holdings, LLC from 2005 until 2019.

Covey also appeared in an episode of the American TV show Home Improvement. Series 3, Episode 24, titled "Reality Bytes", aired May 18, 1994. The Hubble repair crew appeared on the fictional show-within-a-show Tool Time, where they showed some of the tools they used in space. During the closing credits, Covey also presented the cast and crew of Home Improvement with a frame containing a flag, crew patch and some photos. The flag and patch had flown around four million miles in space.

== Special honors ==
Covey has been awarded 2 Defense Distinguished Service Medals, the Defense Superior Service Medal, the Legion of Merit, 5 Air Force Distinguished Flying Crosses, 16 Air Medals, the Air Force Meritorious Service Medal, the Air Force Commendation Medal, the National Intelligence Medal of Achievement, the NASA Distinguished Service Medal, the NASA Distinguished Public Service Medal, the NASA Outstanding Leadership Medal, the NASA Exceptional Service Medal, 4 NASA Space Flight Medals, the NASA Public Service Medal, the Johnson Space Center Certificate of Commendation, the American Institute of Aeronautics and Astronautics (AIAA) Haley Space Flight Award for 1988, and the American Astronautical Society (AAS) Flight Achievement Award for 1988. He is a Distinguished Graduate of the U.S. Air Force Academy, received the Liethen-Tittle Award as the Outstanding Graduate of U.S. Air Force Test Pilot School Class 74B, and is a Distinguished Astronaut Engineering Alumnus of Purdue University. He has been inducted into the Astronaut Hall of Fame, the Arkansas Aviation Hall of Fame, and the Choctawhatchee High School Hall of Fame. Additionally, he is a Fellow of both the American Institute of Aeronautics and Astronautics and the Society of Experimental Test Pilots. Covey and his crew of STS-61 received the National Space Club's 1994 Goddard Trophy and the National Aeronautics Association's Collier Trophy for 1993.

Arkansas Aviation Historical Society inducted Covey into the Arkansas Aviation Hall of Fame in 1995.
