= Samuel T. Durrance =

American scientist and astronaut (1943–2023)

Samuel Thornton Durrance
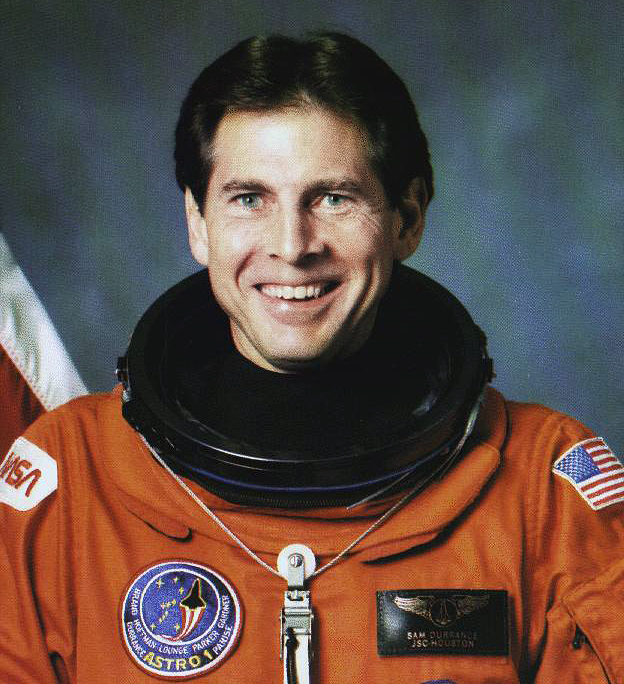
- Durrance in 1996
- Born: September 17, 1943; Tallahassee, Florida, U.S.
- Died: May 5, 2023 (aged 79); Viera, Florida, U.S.
- Education: University of Colorado Boulder California State University, Los Angeles
- Occupation: Physicist
- Space career

JHU Payload Specialist
- Time in space: 25d 14h 13min
- Missions: STS-35, STS-67
- Mission insignia

Samuel Thornton Durrance (September 17, 1943 – May 5, 2023) was an American scientist who flew aboard two NASA Space Shuttle missions as a payload specialist.

== Background ==
Durrance was born September 17, 1943, in Tallahassee, Florida, but grew up in Tampa, Florida. He attended Wilson Junior High and graduated from Plant High School in 1961, lettering in American football for three years and playing both defense and offense. He received a Bachelor of Science degree and a Master of Science degree in physics (with honors), at California State University, Los Angeles (Cal State LA), 1972 and 1974, respectively, and a Doctor of Philosophy degree in astro-geophysics at the University of Colorado at Boulder, 1980. In 2000, he was awarded an Honorary Doctor of Science from the University of Colorado at Boulder along with eight other astronaut alums.

Durrance was a principal research scientist in the Department of Physics and Astronomy at Johns Hopkins University, Baltimore, Maryland. He was a co-investigator for the Hopkins Ultraviolet Telescope, one of the instruments of the Astro Observatory.

Beginning in 2001, he was the executive director of the Florida Space Research Institute which was located at the NASA Kennedy Space Center.

Durrance resided in Melbourne, Florida, and was a professor of physics and space sciences at Florida Institute of Technology.

Durrance was a member of the American Astronomical Society, American Geophysical Union, International Astronomical Union, Association of Space Explorers, Planetary Society, and Phi Kappa Phi.

== Academic career ==
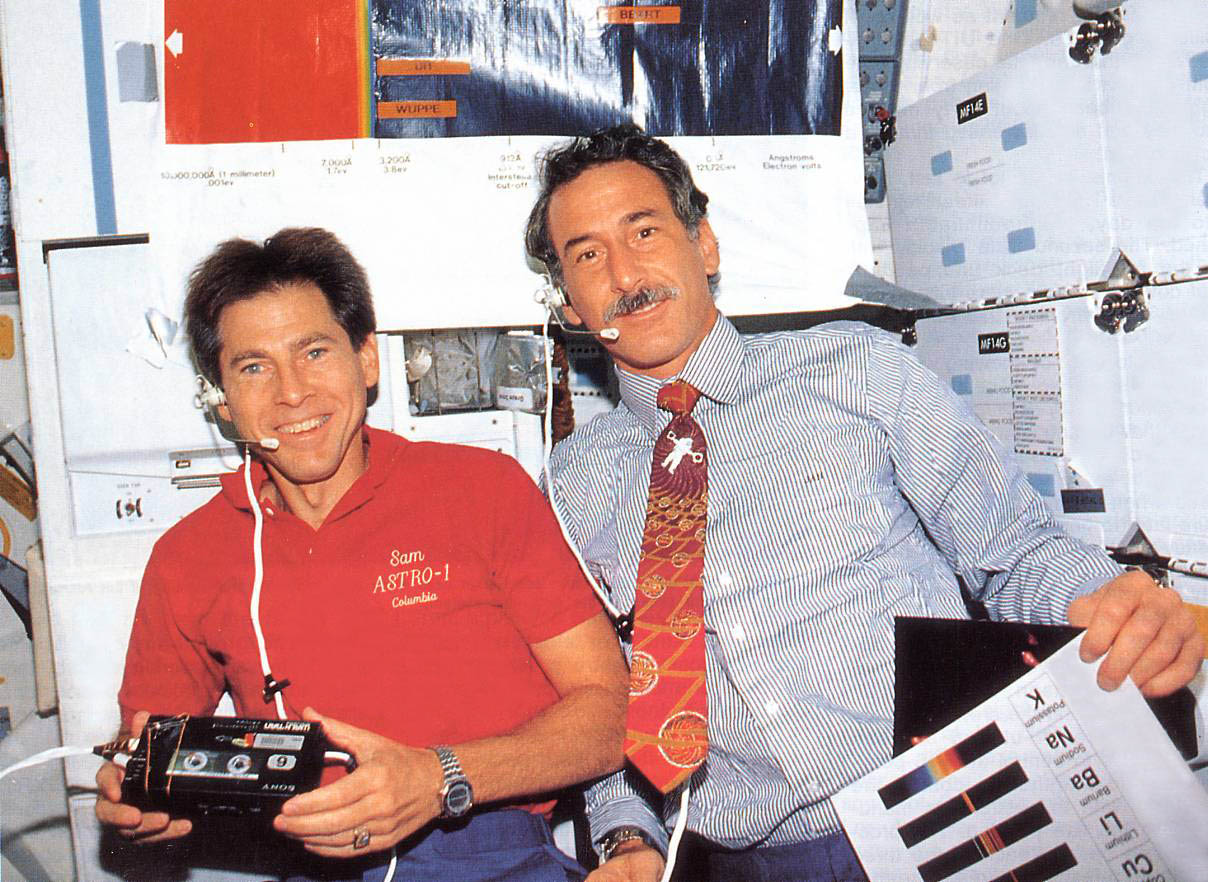
Sam Durrance and Jeffrey Hoffman during the first classroom lesson broadcast from space

Durrance had been involved in the flight hardware development, optical and mechanical design, construction, and integration of the Hopkins Ultraviolet Telescope and the Astro Observatory, and had conducted research and directed graduate students at the Johns Hopkins University He had designed and built spectrometers, detectors, and imaging systems, and made numerous spacecraft and ground-based astronomical observations. He conceived and directed a program at Johns Hopkins University to develop adaptive-optics instrumentation for ground-based astronomy. He led the team that designed and constructed the Adaptive Optics Coronagraph, which led to the discovery of the first cool brown dwarf orbiting a nearby star. He was also a co-discoverer of changes in the planet-forming disk surrounding the star beta Pictoris.

In March 1986, Durrance's first mission was for STS-61-E. It was canceled after the Challenger disaster. Durrance logged over 615 hours in space as a payload specialist and member of the crew of Space Shuttle Columbia for the STS-35/Astro-1 and Space Shuttle Endeavour for the STS-67/Astro-2 missions.

== Later assignment (2006) ==
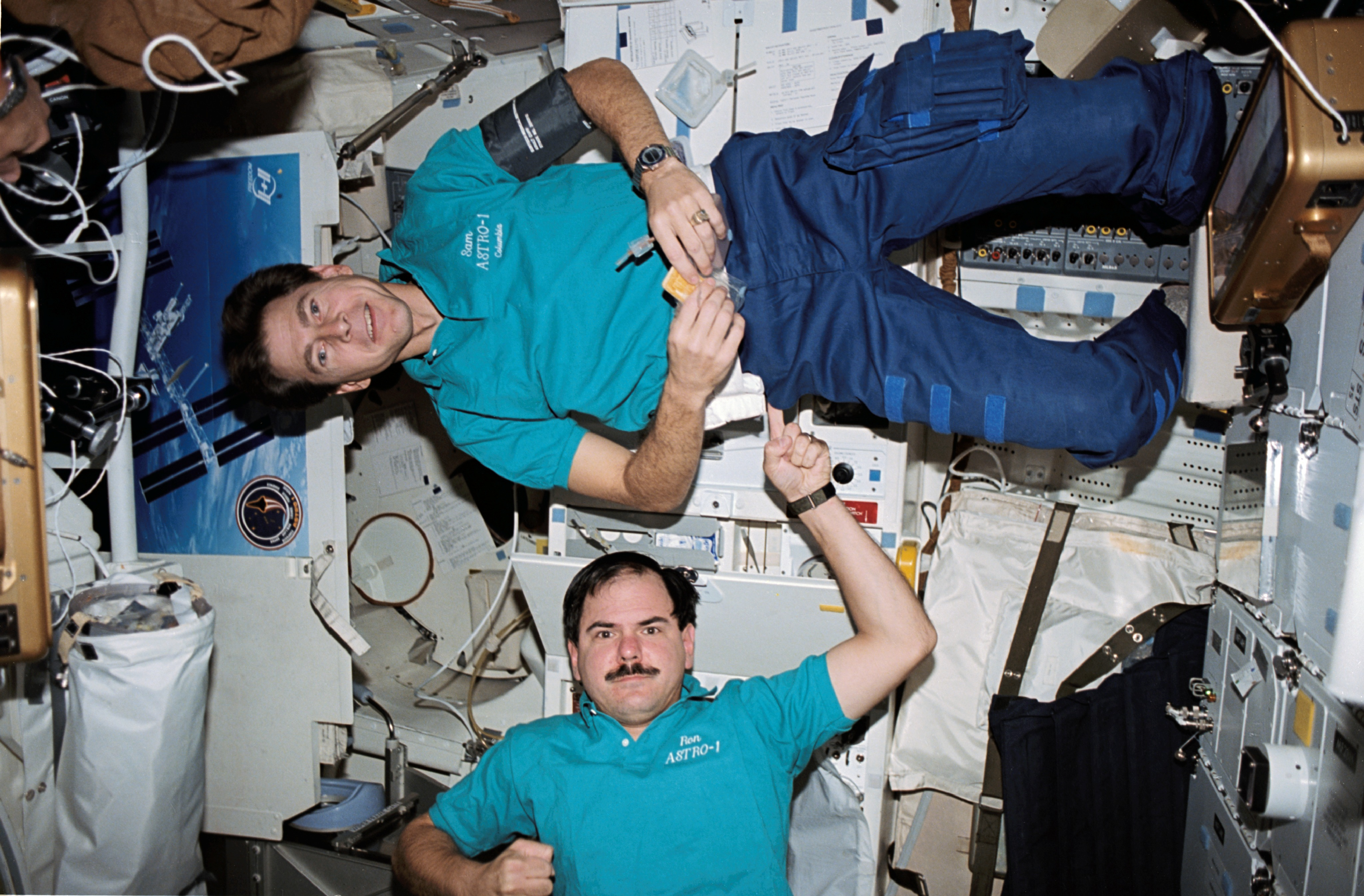
Payload Specialists Durrance and Parise work out.

Durrance was employed by the Florida Institute of Technology in Melbourne, Florida, serving as a professor in the Department of Aerospace, Physics and Space Sciences.

== Illness and death ==
Durrance was diagnosed with Alzheimer's disease in 2021. He died at a hospice facility in Viera, Florida, on May 5, 2023, of complications from a fall, after battling dementia and Parkinson's disease. He was 79.
