= STS-35 =

1990 American crewed spaceflight

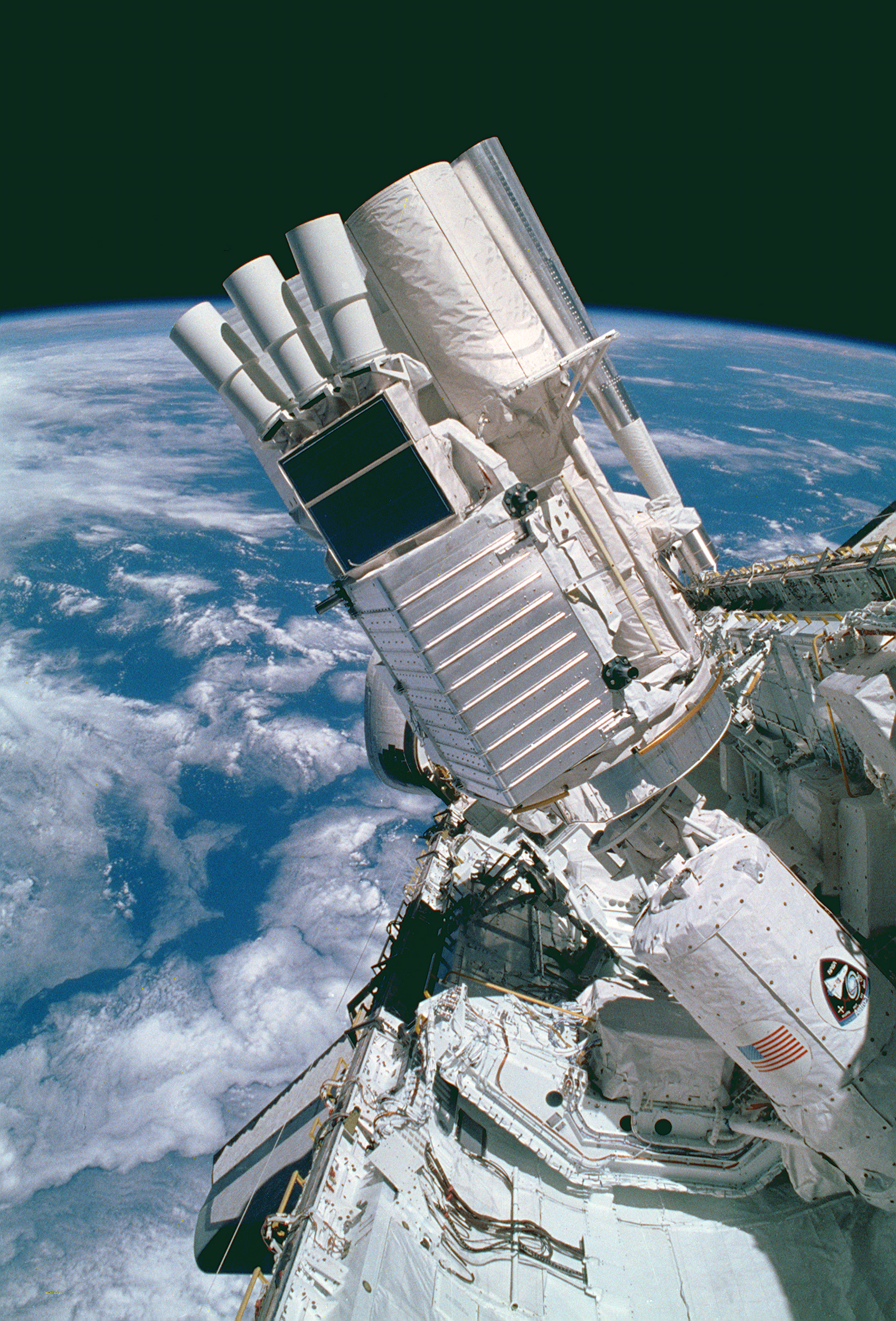
- ASTRO-1 in Columbia's payload bay
- Names: Space Transportation System-35
- Mission type: Astronomical observations
- Operator: NASA
- COSPAR ID: 1990-106A
- SATCAT no.: 20980
- Mission duration: 8 days, 23 hours, 5 minutes, 8 seconds
- Distance travelled: 6,000,658 km (3,728,636 mi)
- Orbits completed: 144

Spacecraft properties
- Spacecraft: Space Shuttle Columbia
- Launch mass: 121,344 kg (267,518 lb)
- Landing mass: 102,208 kg (225,330 lb)
- Payload mass: 12,095 kg (26,665 lb)

Crew
- Crew size: 7
- Members: Vance D. Brand; Guy S. Gardner; Jeffrey A. Hoffman; John M. Lounge; Robert A. Parker; Samuel T. Durrance; Ronald Parise

Start of mission
- Launch date: December 2, 1990, 06:49:01 UTC (1:49:01 am EST)
- Launch site: Kennedy, LC-39B
- Contractor: Rockwell International

End of mission
- Landing date: December 11, 1990, 05:54:09 UTC (9:54:09 pm PST)
- Landing site: Edwards, Runway 22

Orbital parameters
- Reference system: Geocentric orbit
- Regime: Low Earth orbit
- Perigee altitude: 352 km (219 mi)
- Apogee altitude: 362 km (225 mi)
- Inclination: 28.46°
- Period: 91.70 minutes

Instruments
- ASTRO-1; Broad Band X-ray Telescope (BBXRT-01); Fast scan television (FSTV); Hopkins Ultraviolet Telescope (HUT); Instrument Pointing System (IPS); Shuttle Amateur Radio Experiment (SAREX-II); Slow-scan television (SSTV); Two-Axis Pointing System (TAPS); Ultraviolet Imaging Telescope (UIT); Wisconsin Ultraviolet Photo-Polarimeter Experiment (WUPPE)
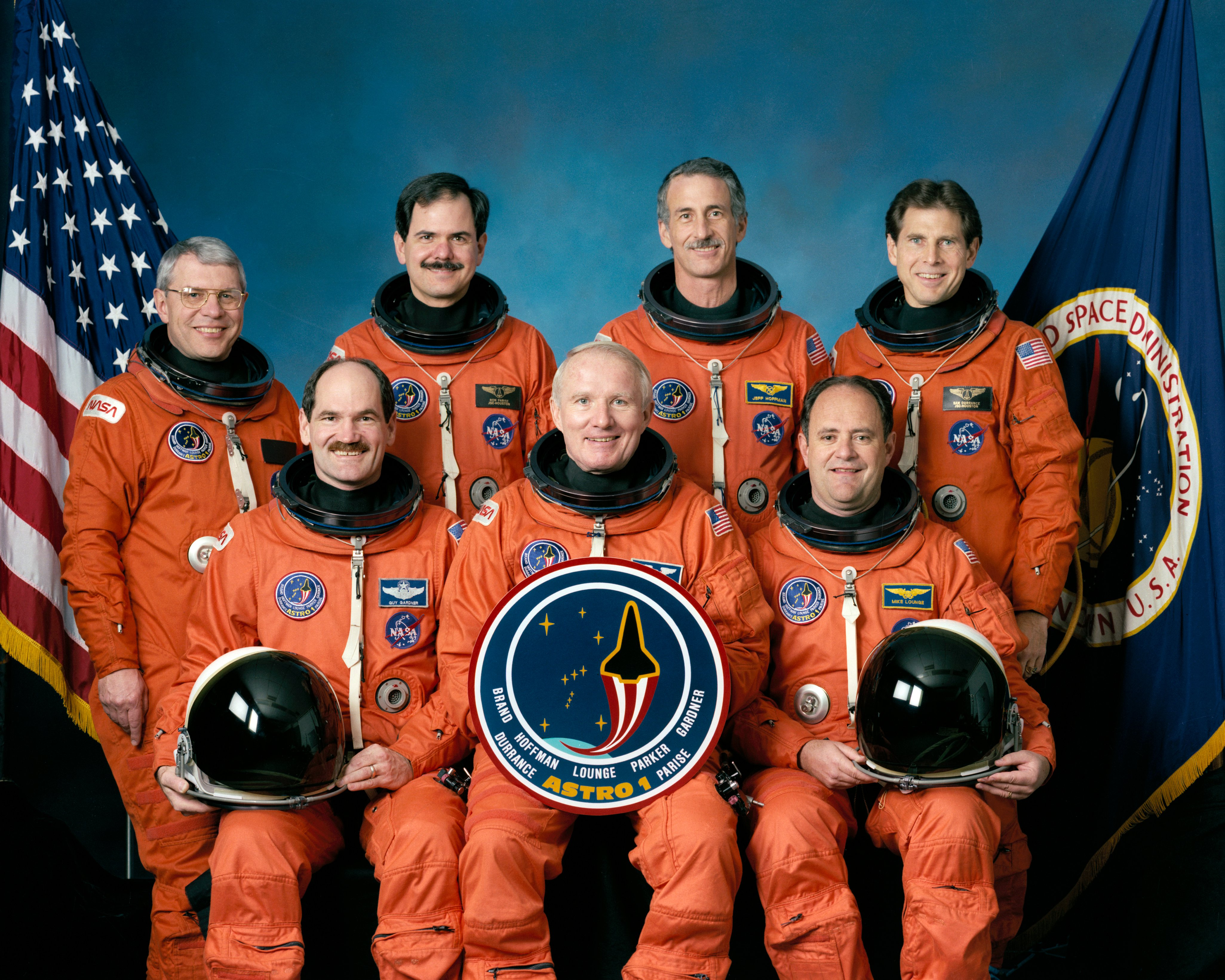
- STS-35 mission patch Back row: Parker, Parise, Hoffman and Durrance; Front row: Gardner, Brand and Lounge Space Shuttle program

STS-35 was the tenth flight of Space Shuttle Columbia, in the 38th shuttle mission. It was devoted to astronomical observations with ASTRO-1, a Spacelab observatory consisting of four telescopes. The mission launched from Kennedy Space Center in Florida on December 2, 1990. It was also the first shuttle mission since the Challenger disaster with a crew of seven astronauts.

== Crew ==
Position	Astronaut
Commander	Vance D. Brand; Fourth and last spaceflight
Pilot	Guy S. Gardner; Second and last spaceflight
Mission Specialist 1	Jeffrey A. Hoffman; Second spaceflight
Mission Specialist 2 Flight Engineer	John M. Lounge; Third and last spaceflight
Mission Specialist 3	Robert A. Parker; Second and last spaceflight
Payload Specialist 1	Samuel T. Durrance; First spaceflight
Payload Specialist 2	Ronald A. Parise; First spaceflight
Member of Blue Team; Member of Red Team

Backup crew
Position	Astronaut
Payload Specialist 1	Kenneth H. Nordsieck
Payload Specialist 2	John-David F. Bartoe

Prior to the Challenger disaster, this mission was slated to launch in March 1986 as STS-61-E. Jon A. McBride was originally assigned to command this mission, which would have been his second spaceflight. He chose to retire from NASA in May 1989 and was replaced as mission commander by Vance D. Brand. In addition, Richard N. Richards (as pilot) and David C. Leestma (as mission specialist), were replaced by Guy S. Gardner and John M. Lounge respectively. Fifty-nine-year-old Brand was the oldest astronaut to fly into space until F. Story Musgrave, 61 on STS-80 in 1996, and U.S. Senator John H. Glenn Jr., 77 when he flew on STS-95 in 1998.

=== Crew seat assignments ===
Seat	Launch	Landing	Seats 1–4 are on the flight deck. Seats 5–7 are on the mid-deck.
1	Brand		Seats 1–4 are on the flight deck. Seats 5–7 are on the mid-deck.
2	Gardner		Seats 1–4 are on the flight deck. Seats 5–7 are on the mid-deck.
3	Hoffman	Parker	Seats 1–4 are on the flight deck. Seats 5–7 are on the mid-deck.
4	Lounge		Seats 1–4 are on the flight deck. Seats 5–7 are on the mid-deck.
5	Parker	Hoffman	Seats 1–4 are on the flight deck. Seats 5–7 are on the mid-deck.
6	Durrance		Seats 1–4 are on the flight deck. Seats 5–7 are on the mid-deck.
7	Parise		Seats 1–4 are on the flight deck. Seats 5–7 are on the mid-deck.

== Preparations and launch ==
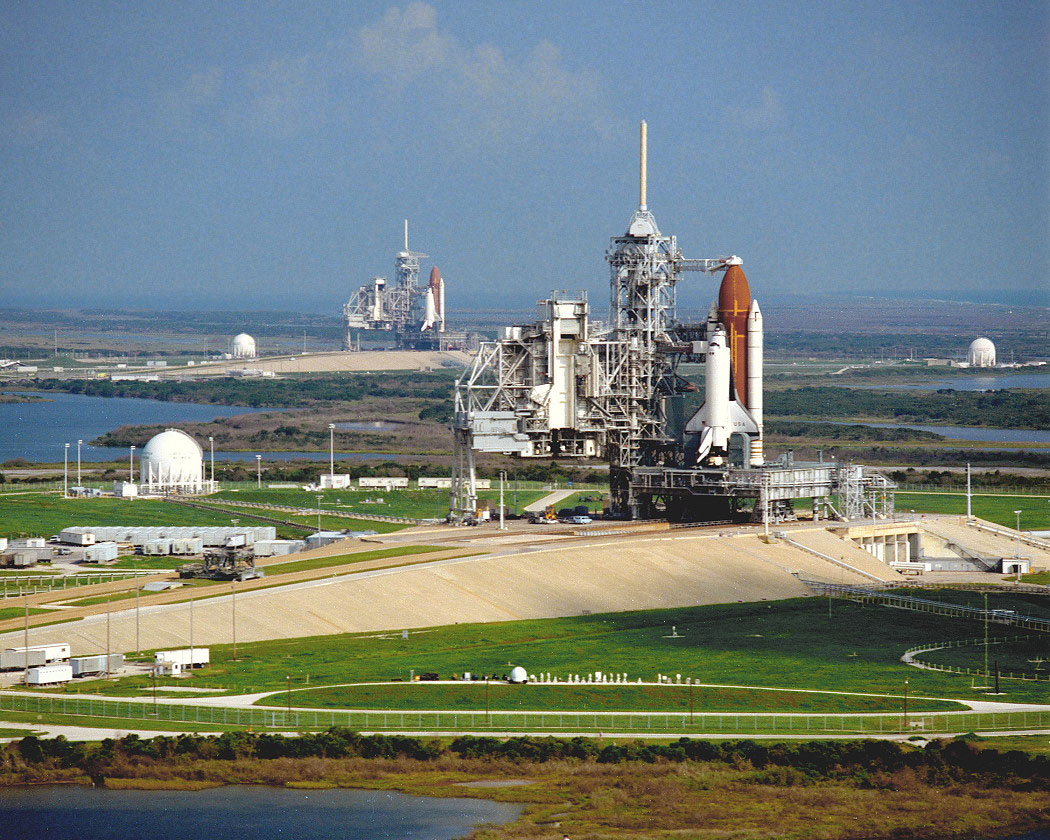
Columbia on Pad 39A with Discovery on Pad 39B in the distance.

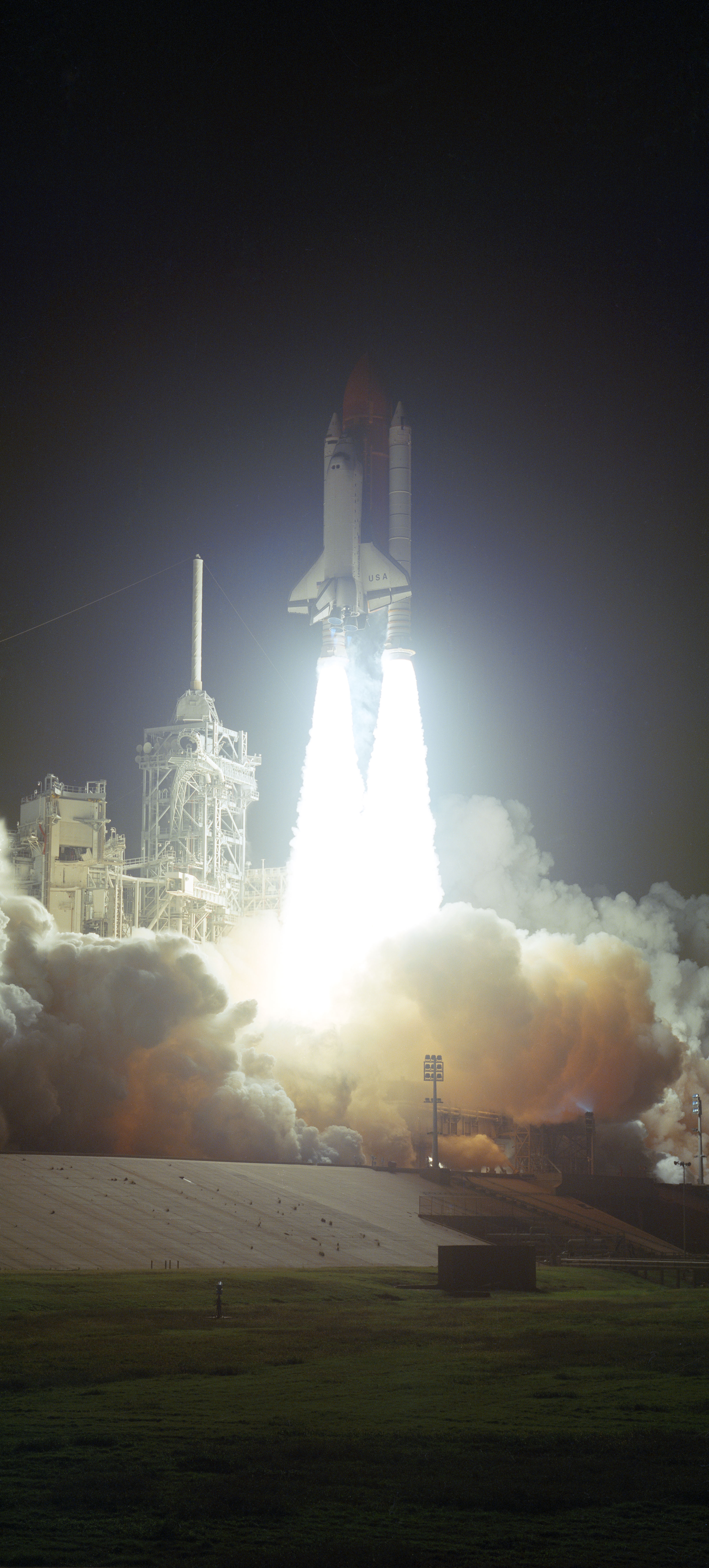
Columbia finally heads aloft on December 2, 1990.

The much-delayed ASTRO-1 had originally been manifested to fly on what would have been the next shuttle mission after Challenger's ill-fated STS-51-L as STS-61-E in March 1986. The mission was remanifested as STS-35 during the long stand-down after the accident with the addition of the Broad Band X-ray Telescope (BBXRT-01), and the original ASTRO-1 payload was brought out of storage and recertified for flight. Columbia rolled out to Pad 39A in late April 1990 for a scheduled launch date of May 16, 1990. Following the Flight Readiness Review (FRR), announcement of a firm launch date was delayed to change a faulty freon coolant loop proportional valve in the orbiter's coolant system. At the subsequent Delta FRR, the date was set for May 30, 1990. Launch on May 30 was scrubbed during tanking due to a minor hydrogen leak in the tail service mast on the mobile launcher platform and a major leak in the external tank/orbiter quick disconnect assembly. Hydrogen was also detected in the orbiter's aft compartment and believed to be associated with a leak involving the 43 cm (17 in) umbilical assembly.

Leakage at the 43 cm (17 in) umbilical was confirmed by a mini-tanking test on June 6, 1990. The leakage could not be repaired at the pad, and the vehicle was rolled back to the Vehicle Assembly Building (VAB) June 12, 1990, demated, and transferred to the Orbiter Processing Facility (OPF). The orbiter-side 43 cm (17 in) umbilical assembly was replaced with one borrowed from Endeavour, then still under construction. The external tank (ET) was then fitted with new umbilical hardware. The ASTRO-1 payload was re-serviced regularly and remained in Columbia's cargo bay during orbiter repairs and reprocessing.

Columbia was rolled out to Pad A for the second time on August 9, 1990, to support a September 1, 1990, launch date. Two days before launch, the avionics box on the BBXRT-01 portion of the ASTRO-1 payload malfunctioned and had to be changed and retested. Launch was rescheduled for September 6, 1990. During tanking, high concentrations of hydrogen were again detected in the orbiter's aft compartment, forcing another postponement. NASA managers concluded that Columbia had experienced separate hydrogen leaks from the beginning: one of the umbilical assembly (now replaced) and one or more which had resurfaced in the aft compartment. Suspicion focused on the package of three hydrogen recirculation pumps in the aft compartment. These were replaced and retested. A damaged Teflon cover seal in the main engine number three hydrogen prevalve was replaced. Launch was rescheduled for September 18, 1990. The fuel leak in the aft compartment resurfaced during tanking, and the launch was scrubbed again. The STS-35 mission was put on hold until problem resolved by a special tiger team assigned by the Space Shuttle director.

Columbia was transferred to Pad B on October 8, 1990, to make room for Atlantis on Mission STS-38. Tropical storm Klaus forced another rollback to the VAB on October 9, 1990. The vehicle was transferred to Pad B again on October 14, 1990. Another mini-tanking test was conducted on October 30, 1990, using special sensors and video cameras and employing a see-through Plexiglas aft compartment door. No excessive hydrogen leakage was detected. With the problem resolved, the flight had only to wait for the completion of STS-38, imparting another four-week delay. A scheduled launch date of November 30, 1990, was moved by several days due to concerns that observations of astronomical targets would be adversely affected. Liftoff on December 2, 1990, was delayed by 21 minutes to allow the U.S. Air Force time to observe low-level clouds that might impede the tracking of the Shuttle's ascent. Liftoff finally occurred on December 2, 1990, 1:49:01 a.m. EST, the ninth night launch in shuttle history and the second for Columbia. A nominal ascent to orbit followed. This was one of the most delayed launches of the Space Shuttle program.

== Mission highlights ==
The primary payload of the mission STS-35 was ASTRO-1, the fifth flight of the Spacelab system and the second with the Igloo and two pallets train configuration. The primary objectives were round-the-clock observations of the celestial sphere in ultraviolet and X-ray spectral wavelengths with the ASTRO-1 observatory, consisting of four telescopes: Hopkins Ultraviolet Telescope (HUT); Wisconsin Ultraviolet Photo-Polarimeter Experiment (WUPPE); Ultraviolet Imaging Telescope (UIT), mounted on the Instrument Pointing System (IPS). The Instrument Pointing System consisted of a three-axis gimbal system mounted on a gimbal support structure connected to a Spacelab pallet at one end and the aft end of the payload at the other, a payload clamping system for support of the mounted experiment during launch and landing, and a control system based on the inertial reference of a three-axis gyro package and operated by a gimbal-mounted microcomputer. The Broad-Band X-Ray Telescope (BBXRT) and its Two-Axis Pointing System (TAPS) rounded out the instrument complement in the aft payload bay.

The crew split into shifts after reaching orbit, with Gardner, Parker, and Parise comprising the Red Team; the Blue Team consisted of Hoffman, Durrance, and Lounge. Commander Brand was unassigned to either team and helped coordinate mission activities. The telescopes were powered up and raised from their stowed position by the Red Team 11 hours into the flight. Observations began under the Blue Team 16 hours into the mission after the instruments were checked out. In a typical ASTRO-1 ultraviolet observation, the flight crew member on duty maneuvered the Shuttle to point the cargo bay in the general direction of the astronomical object to be observed. The mission specialist commanded the pointing system to aim at the telescopes toward the target. They also locked on to guide stars to help the pointing system remain stable despite orbiter thruster firings. The payload specialist set up each instrument for the upcoming observation, identified the celestial target on the guide television, and provided the necessary pointing corrections for placing the object precisely in the telescope's field of view. He then started the instrument observation sequences and monitored the data being recorded. Because the many observations created a heavy workload, the payload and mission specialists worked together to perform these complicated operations and evaluate the quality of observations. Each observation took between 10 minutes to a little over an hour.

Issues with the pointing precision of the IPS and the sequential overheating failures of both data display units (used for pointing telescopes and operating experiments) during the mission impacted crew-aiming procedures and forced ground teams at Marshall Space Flight Center (MSFC) to aim the telescopes with fine-tuning by the flight crew. BBXRT-01 was directed from the outset by ground-based operators at Goddard Space Flight Center (GSFC) and was not affected. The X-ray telescope required little attention from the crew. A crew member would turn on the BBXRT and the TAPS at the beginning of operations and then turn them off when the operations concluded. After the telescope was activated, researchers at Goddard could "talk" to the telescope via computer. Before science operations began, stored commands were loaded into the BBXRT computer system. Then, when the astronauts positioned the Shuttle in the general direction of the source, the TAPS automatically pointed the BBXRT at the object. Since the Shuttle could be oriented in only one direction at a time, X-ray observations had to be coordinated carefully with ultraviolet observations. Despite the pointing problems, the full suite of telescopes obtained 231 observations of 130 celestial objects over a combined span of 143 hours. Science teams at Marshall and Goddard estimated that 70% of the mission objectives were completed. ASTRO-1 was the first shuttle mission controlled in part from the Spacelab Mission Operations Control facility at MSFC in Huntsville, Alabama.

During the flight, the crew experienced trouble dumping waste water due to a blocked waste water line, but they managed to compensate using spare containers. Problems also affected one of the RCC thruster and an onboard text and graphics teleprinter which was used for receiving flight plan updates.

=== Extended Duration Orbiter demonstration ===
During STS-35, the crew of Columbia carried out Development Test Objective (DTO) 634, a Trash Compaction and Retention System demonstration conducted as part of the Extended Duration Orbiter (EDO) program. The demonstration evaluated a manually operated trash compactor installed in a middeck locker, intended to reduce the volume of wet and dry waste generated during longer-duration Space Shuttle missions. Astronaut operations associated with DTO-634 were performed on the orbiter’s middeck during the mission. [8][9]

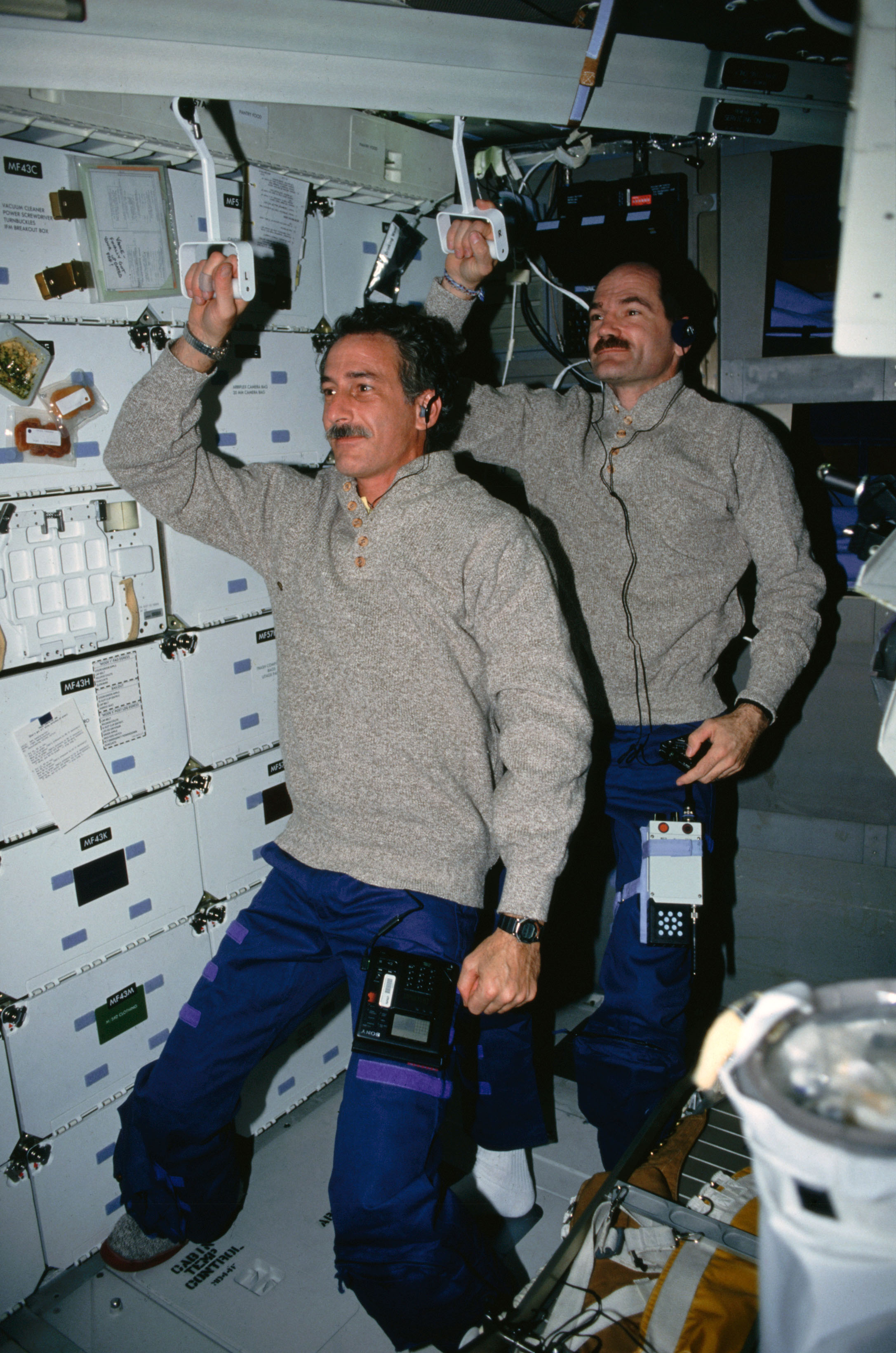
STS-35 Mission Specialist Jeffrey A. Hoffman and Pilot Guy S. Gardner holding Development Test Objective (DTO) 634 trash compactor handles while “commuting” on the middeck of Space Shuttle Columbia (OV-102). The DTO-634 Trash Compaction and Retention System is visible in locker MF43G.

== Additional payloads and experiments ==
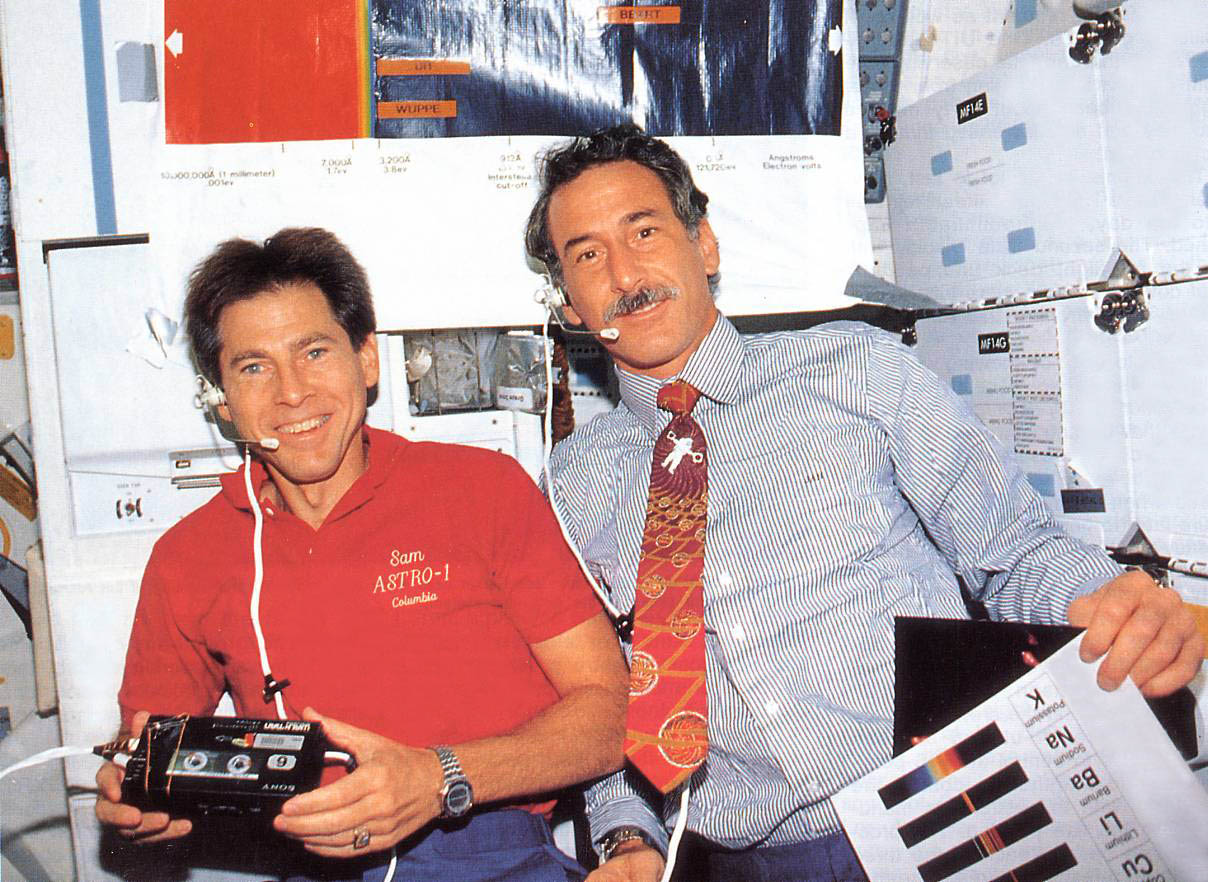
Sam Durrance and Jeffrey Hoffman during the first classroom lesson broadcast from space. Also the first necktie worn in space.

Conducting radio transmissions between ground-based amateur radio operators and a Shuttle-based amateur radio operator was the basis for the Shuttle Amateur Radio Experiment (SAREX-II). SAREX communicated with amateur stations in line-of-sight of the orbiter in one of four transmission modes: voice, Slow-scan television (SSTV), data or (uplink only) Fast scan television (FSTV). The voice mode was operated in the attended mode while SSTV, data or FSTV could be operated in either attended or unattended modes. During the mission, SAREX was operated by Payload Specialist Ron Parise, a licensed operator (WA4SIR), during periods when he was not scheduled for orbiter or other payload activities. A ground-based experiment to calibrate electro-optical sensors at Air Force Maui Optical Site (AMOS) in Hawaii was also conducted during the mission. The Space Classroom Program, Assignment: The Stars project was carried out to spark student interest in science, mathematics and technology. Mission Specialist Hoffman conducted the first classroom lesson taught from space on December 7, 1990, in support of this objective, covering material on the electromagnetic spectrum and the ASTRO-1 observatory. A supporting lesson was taught from the ASTRO-1 control center in Huntsville.

== Landing ==
The mission was cut short by one day due to impending bad weather at the primary landing site, Edwards Air Force Base, California. The Orbital Maneuvering System (OMS) engines were fired at 8:48 p.m. PST over the Indian Ocean to deorbit the spacecraft, which landed on Runway 22 at Edwards Air Force Base, California, at 9:54 p.m. PST, on December 10, 1990, after a mission duration of 8 days, 23 hours, 5 minutes, and 8 seconds. This was the fourth night landing of the shuttle program. Rollout distance: 3.184 km (1.978 mi)). Rollout time: 58 seconds. Columbia returned to KSC on December 20, 1990, on the Shuttle Carrier Aircraft (SCA). Landing weight: 102,208 kg (225,330 lb).

== Image gallery ==
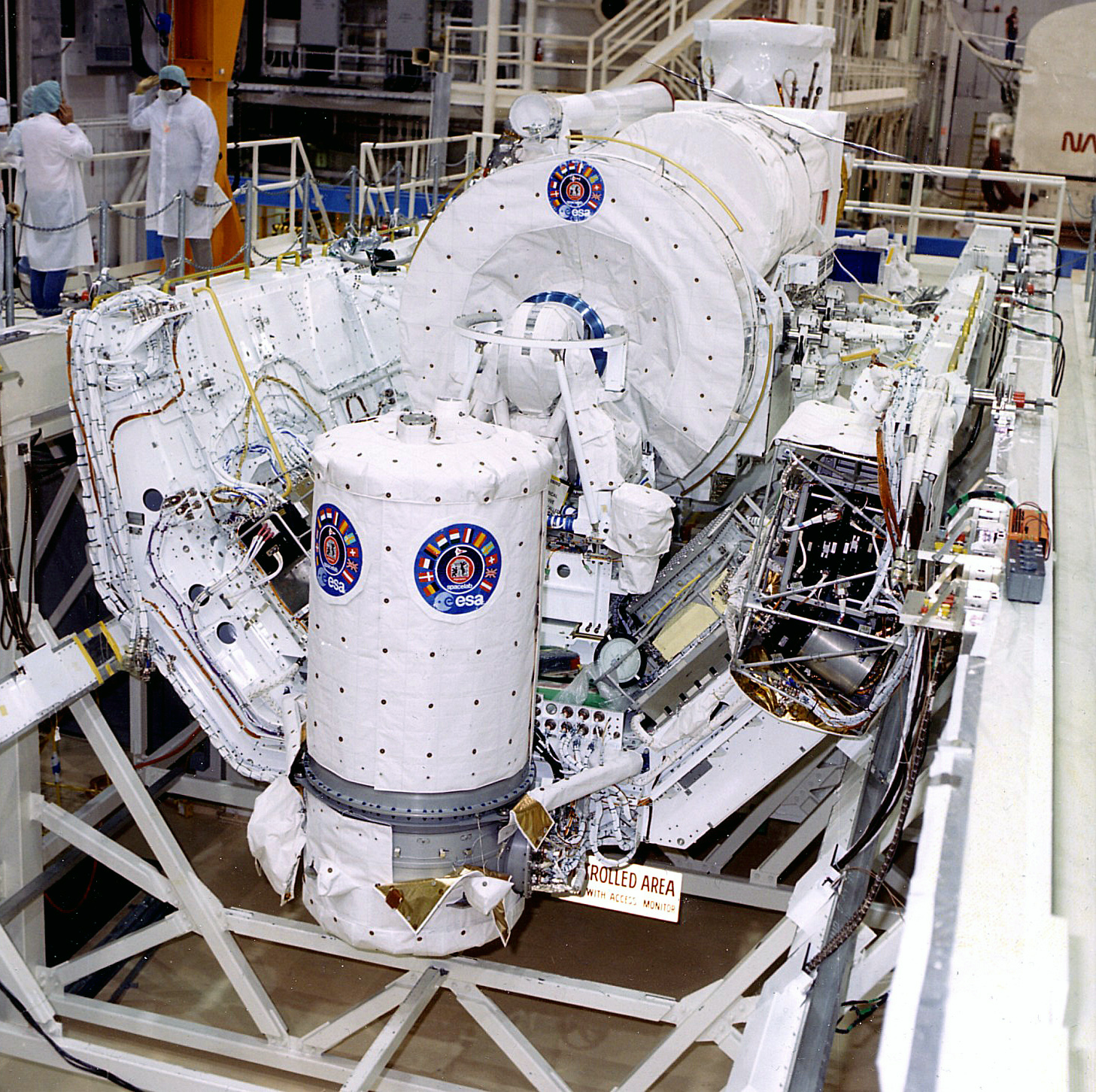
ASTRO-1 undergoes processing post-Challenger

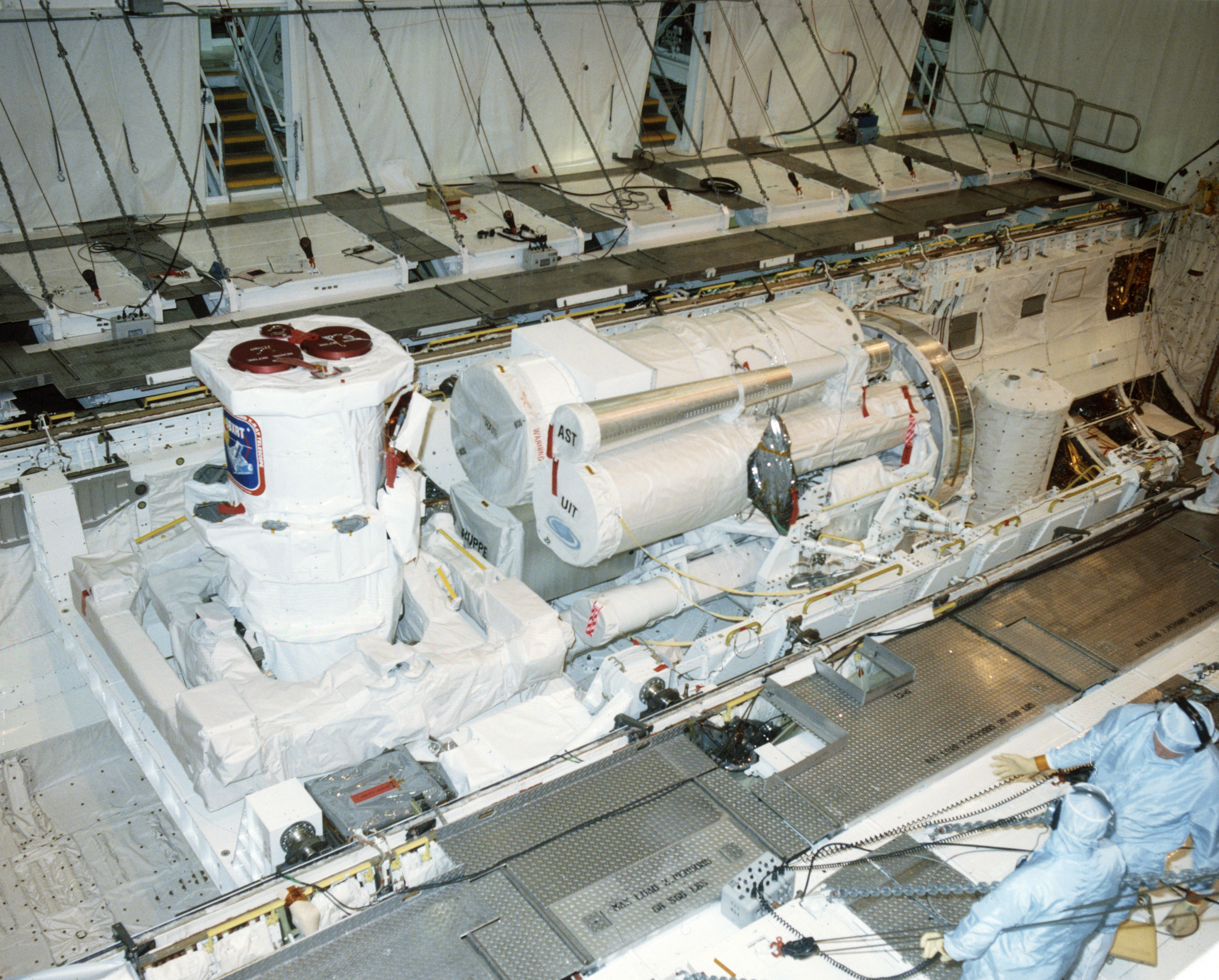
ASTRO-1 aboard Columbia in the Orbiter Processing Facility

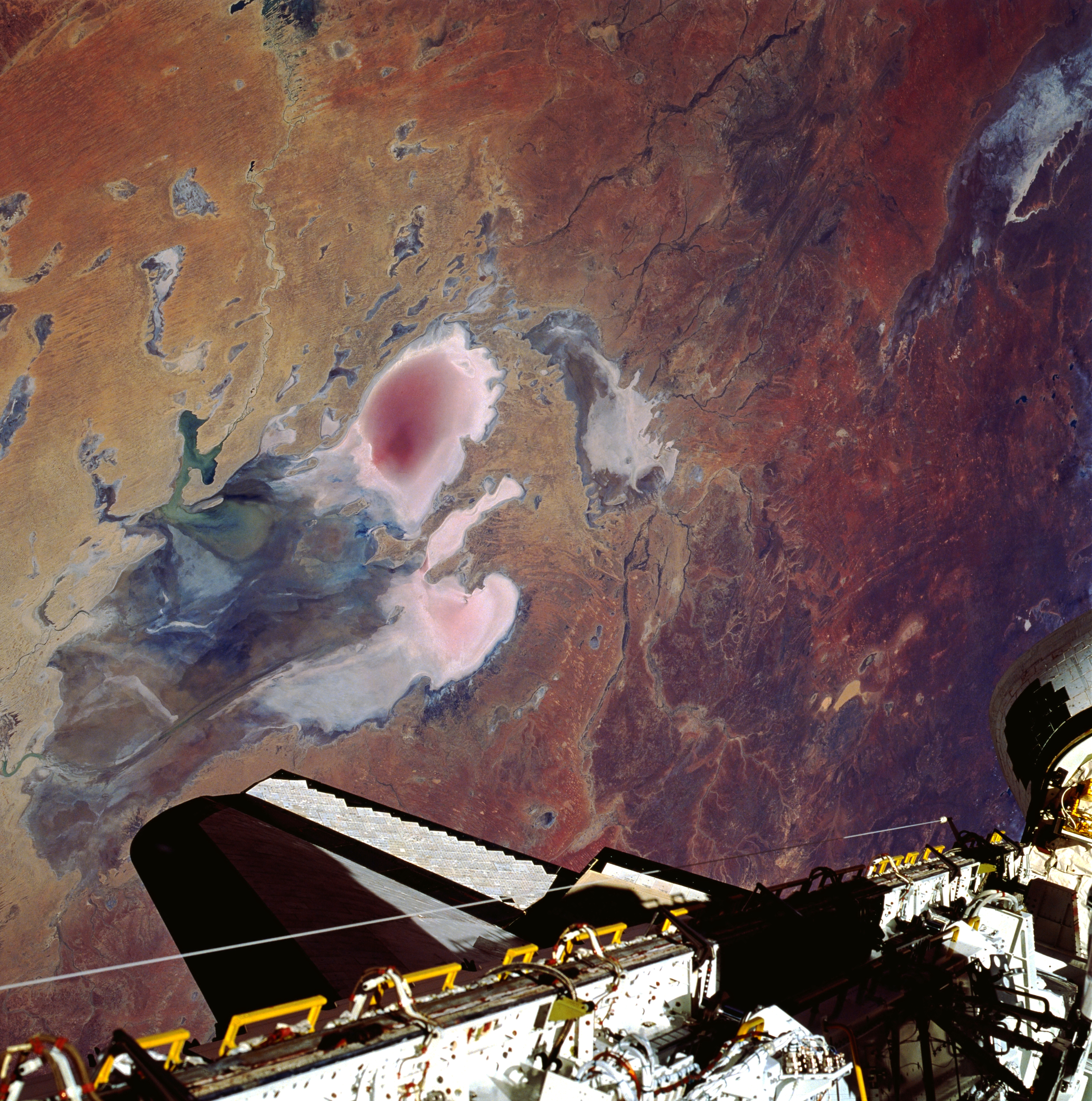
Lake Eyre, Australia from orbit

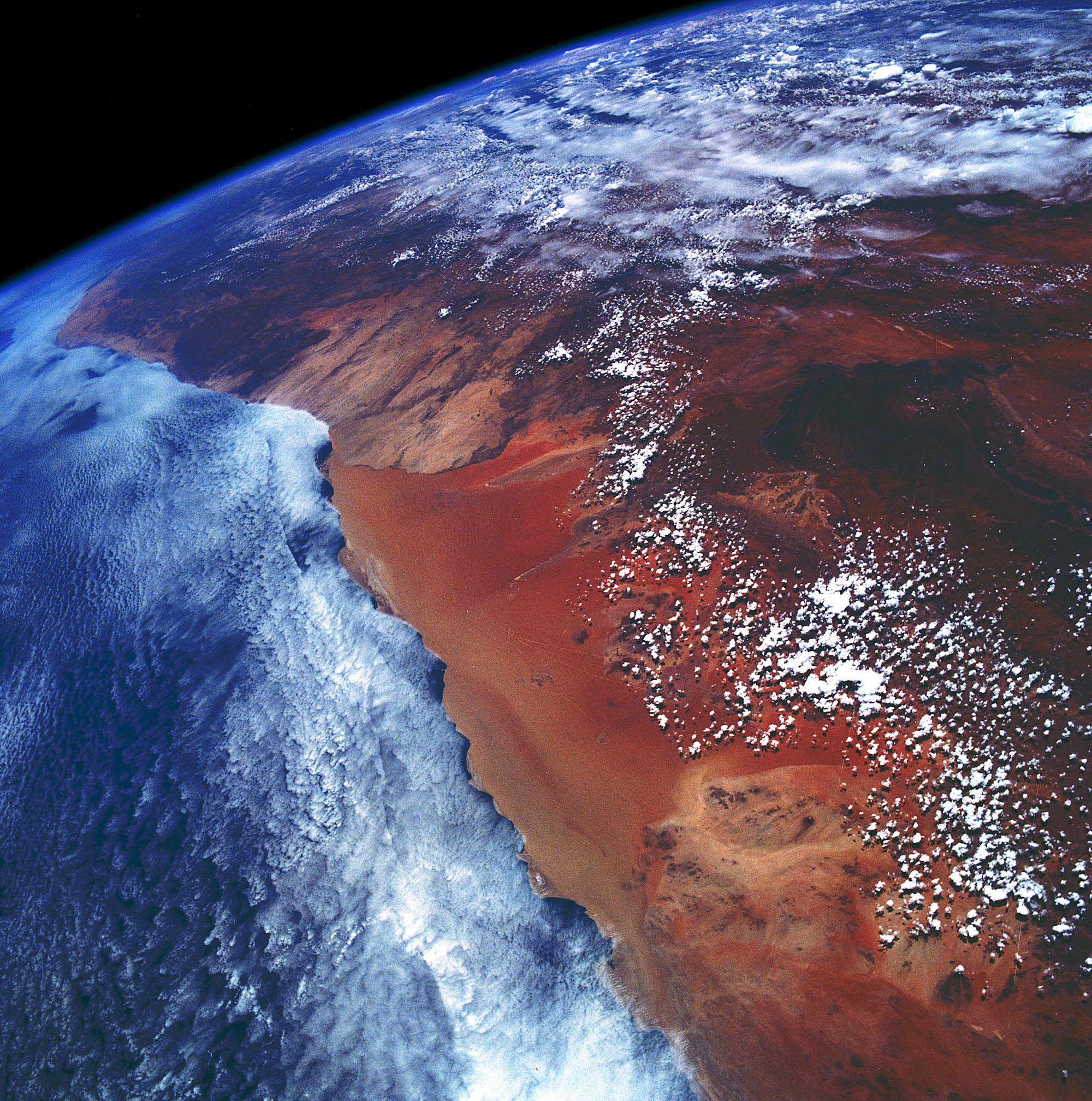
Namibia from orbit

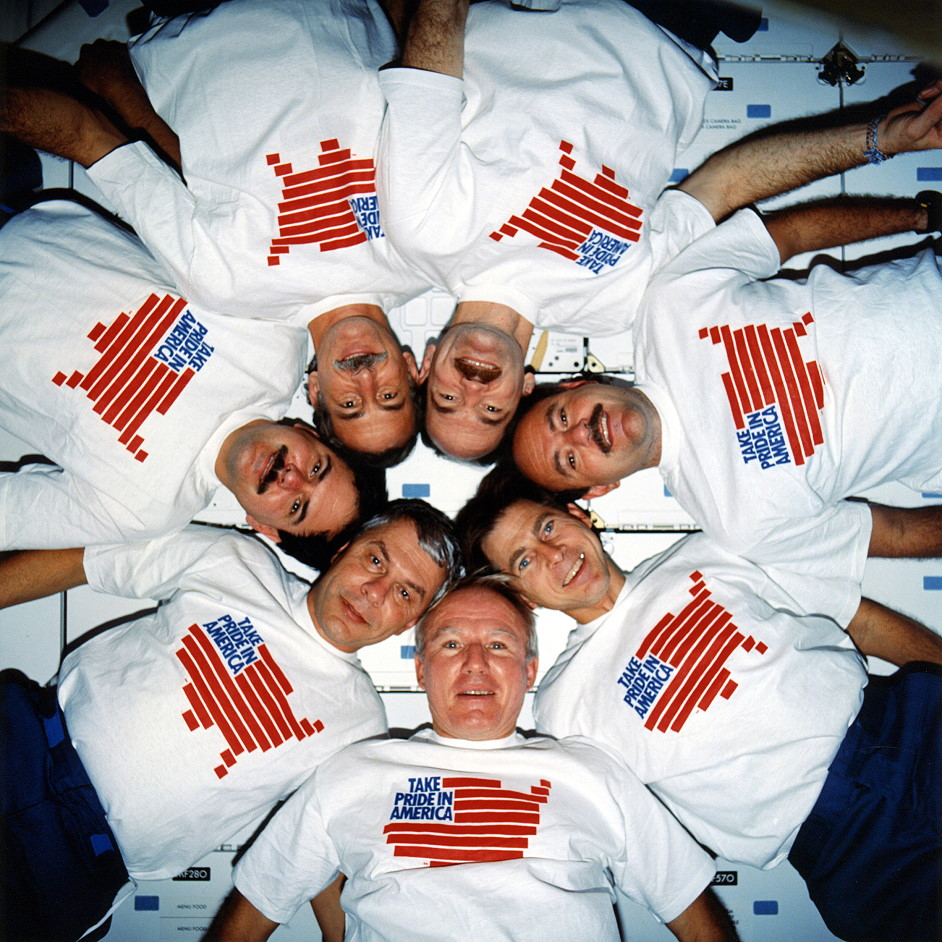
Traditional inflight portrait

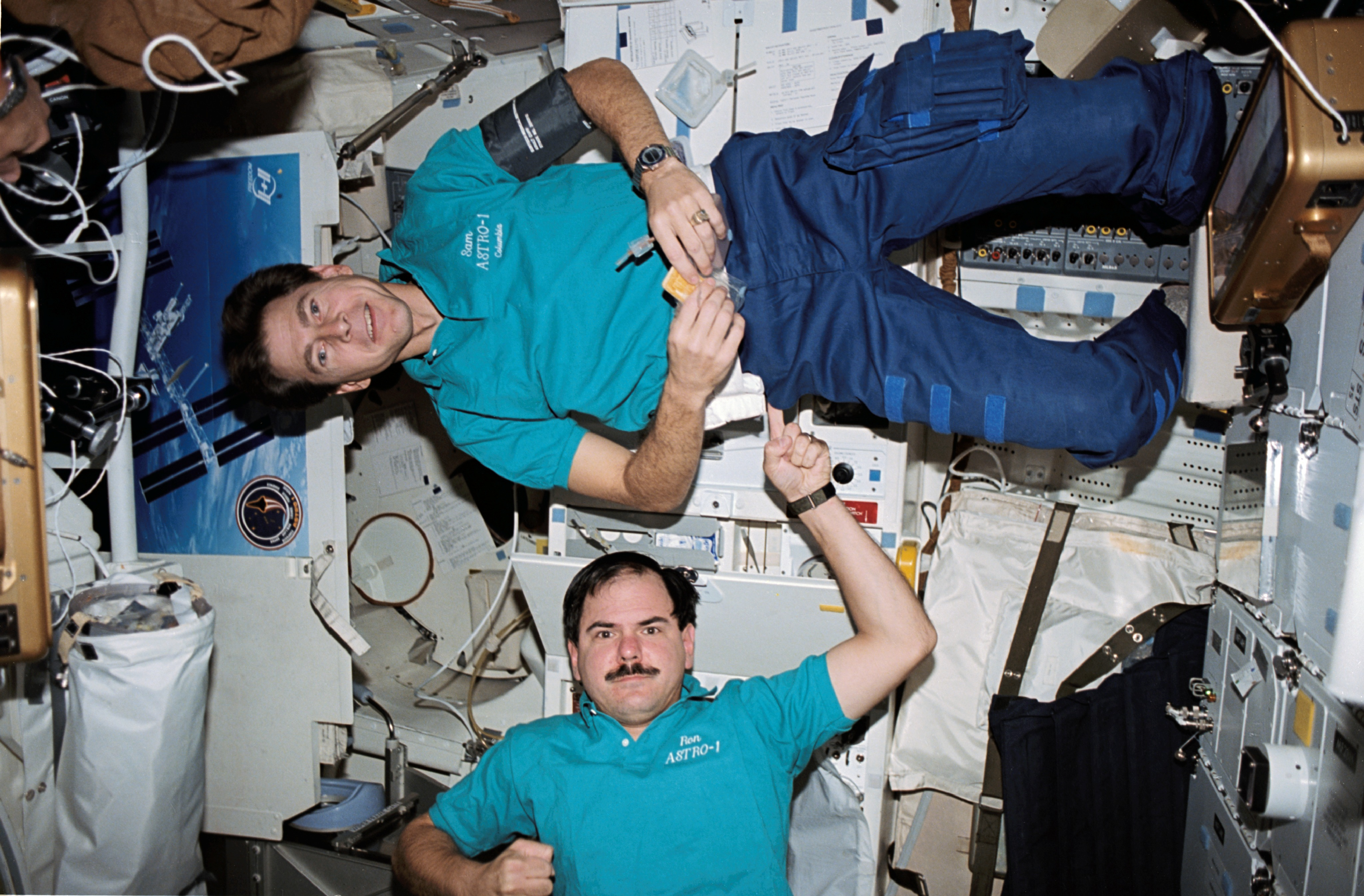
Payload Specialists Durrance and Parise work out

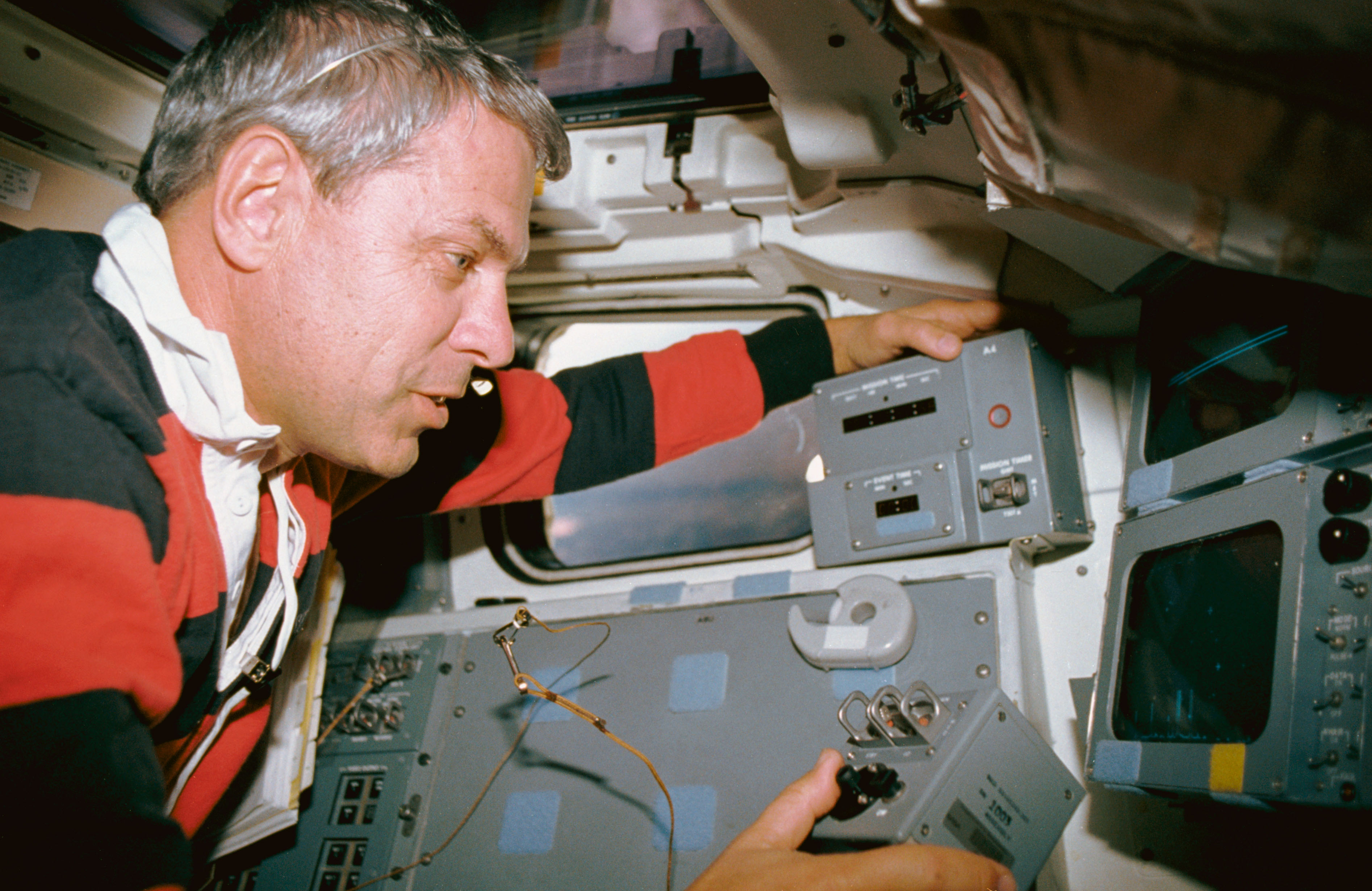
Mission Specialist Parker manually points ASTRO-1's instruments using a toggle on the aft flight deck.

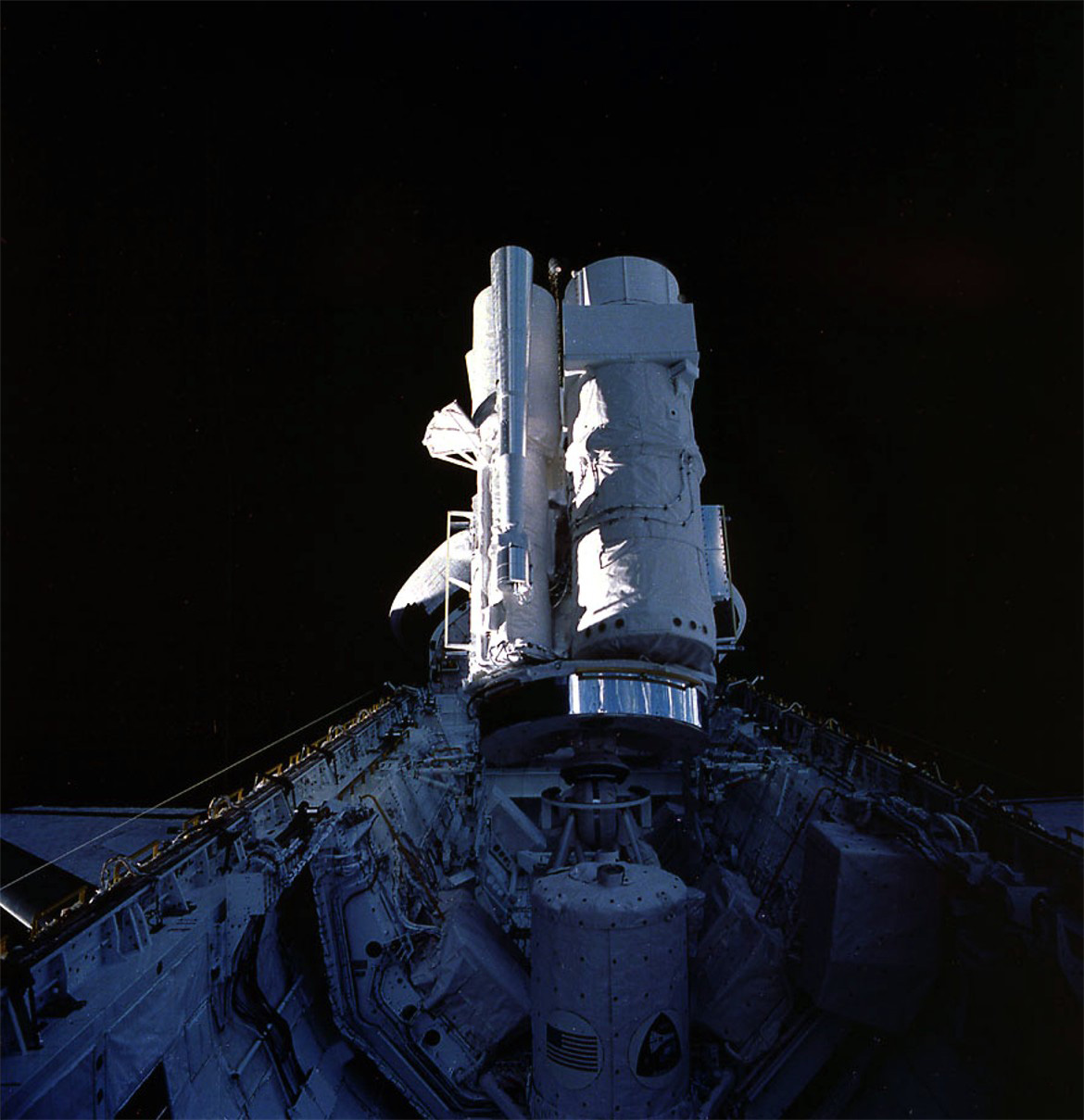
Another view of the observatory

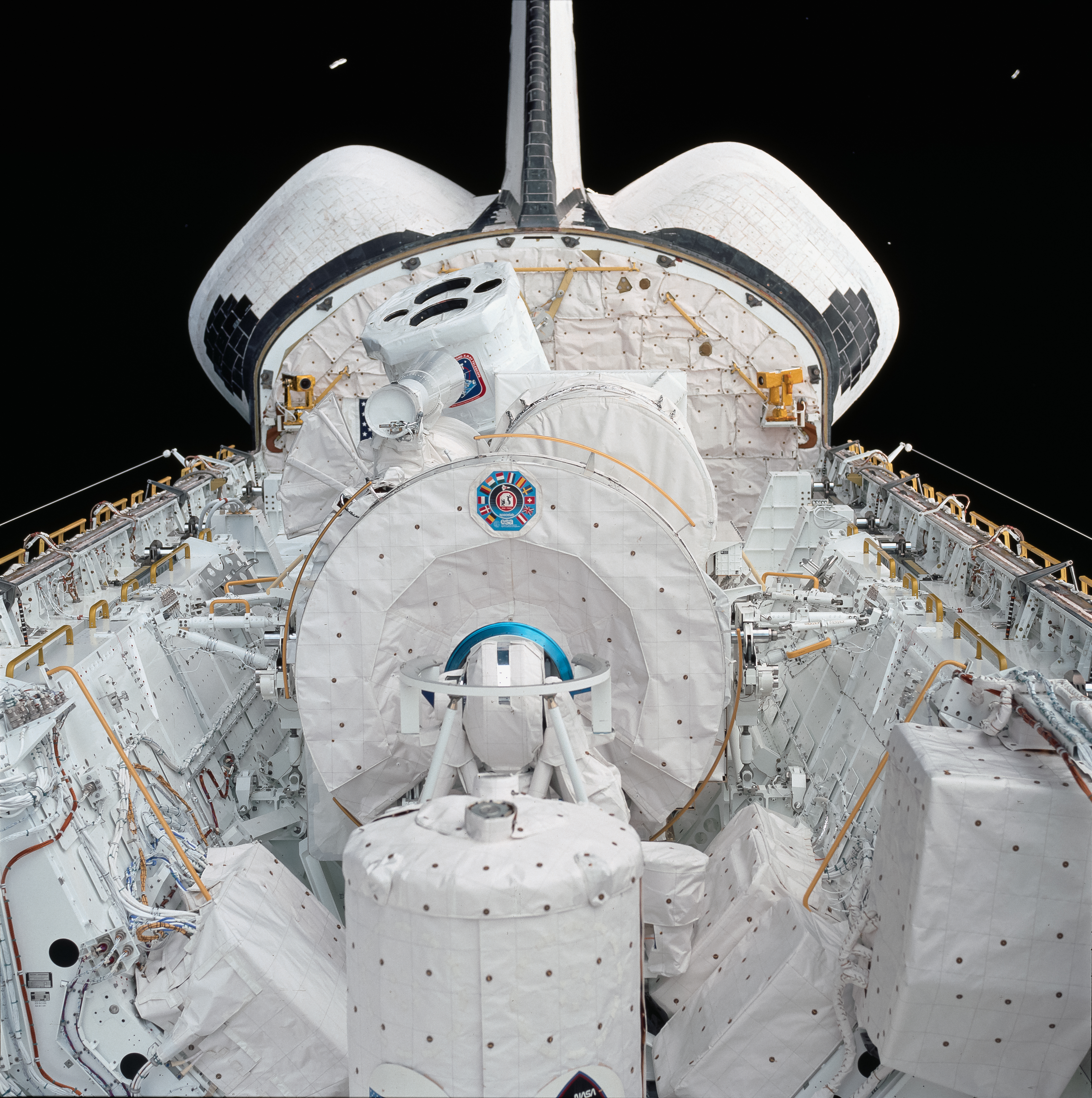
The payload in its stowed configuration

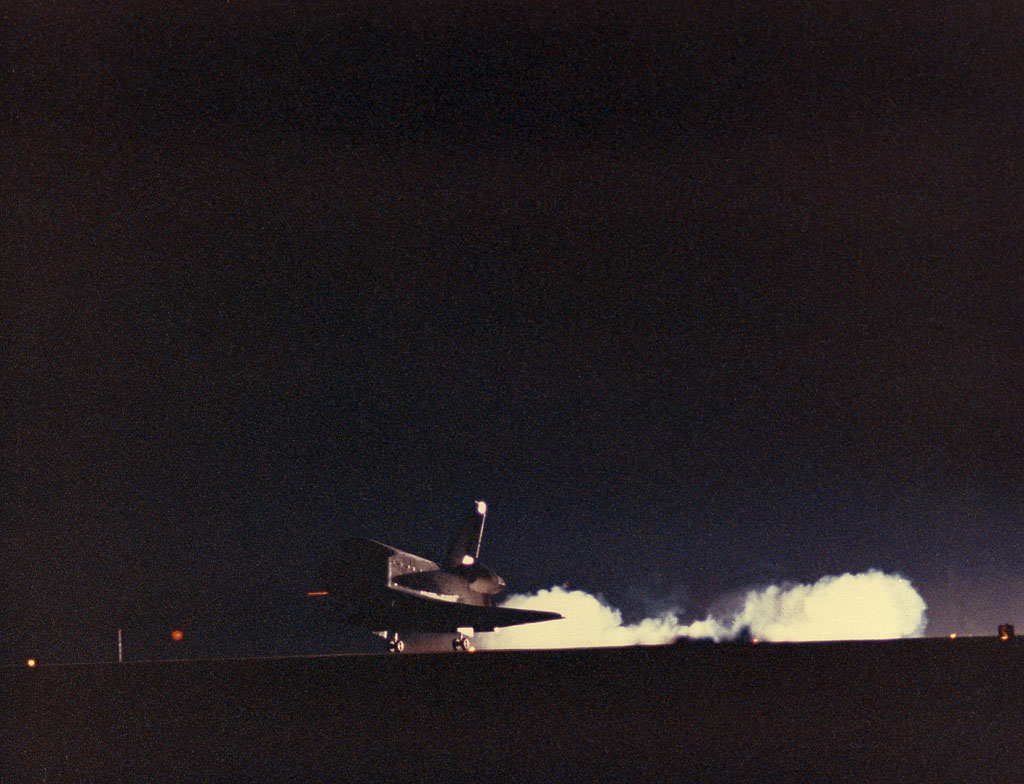
Columbia touches down at Edwards

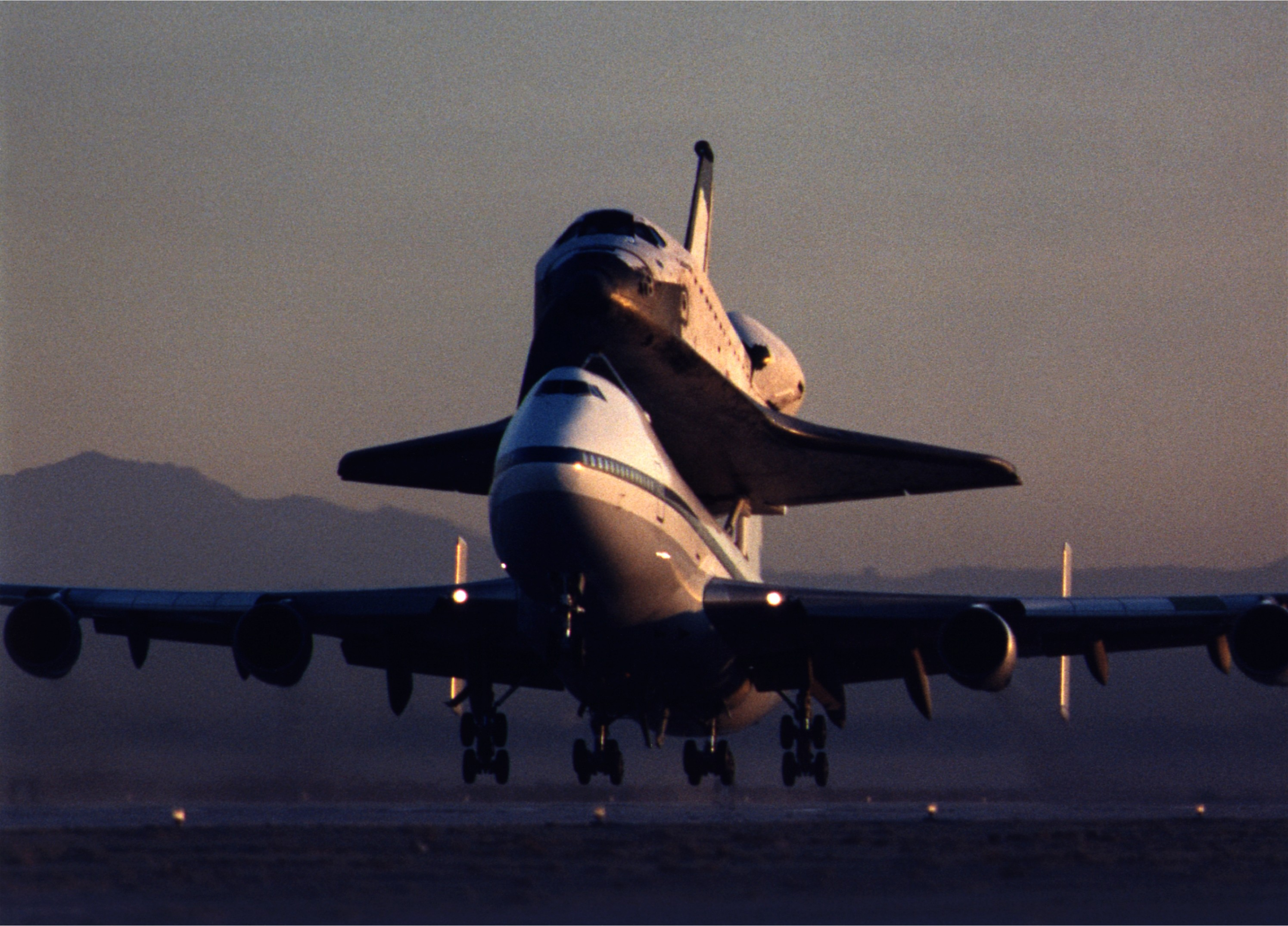
Columbia heads back to KSC

== See also ==
- List of human spaceflights
- List of Space Shuttle missions
- Outline of space science
- Space Shuttle
