= Central location test =

Central location tests, also known as hall tests, are a type of quantitative research technique. They are product, communication development or marketing tests conducted in controlled environments, in contrast to home-user tests, which take place where the products would actually be used.

Up until the early 1970's, marketing research was typically conducted door to door. Changing working patterns and safety concerns resulted in researchers beginning to rent space in malls and other public spaces, with these tests becoming known as hall or central location tests. Consumers would be recruited to participate in research (typically product based) at the mall and the research would be conducted and completed at that time.

Central location tests have evolved beyond malls and the term is now broadly applied to refer to any controlled environment, such as laboratories, company offices or research facilities. Because this research is conducted in controlled environments there are less variables which could impact responses and results.

Central location tests are mainly used to shortlist one or few from multiple options under consideration. They can be used for product tasting, advertising effectiveness or for packaging. Different formats of research conducted using central location tests include monadic, where participants are given one product to test and then complete a questionnaire about it, paired comparison, where the person is given two different products and then completes a comparison questionnaire and sequential monadic tests, where a product is trialled and a questionnaire completed, before repeating these steps with another product and finally doing comparison questionnaires.

Within the food industry, central location tests are more frequently used to research products than home-user tests (although this was impacted by COVID-19). Various research has compared the effectiveness of central location tests, against those completed in a persons home environment, with this often showing that products tested within a home environment are rated more highly by participants, compared to when conducted in a controlled environment, in a central location test.
