= Hoot Gibson (disambiguation) =

Hoot Gibson (1892–1962) was an American rodeo performer, actor, and film director.

Other persons with this nickname include:

- Bob Gibson (1935–2020), Major League Baseball pitcher
- Claude "Hoot" Gibson (1939–2026), American football player and coach
- Harvey "Hoot" Gibson (1934–2015), pilot of TWA Flight 841 (1979), a Boeing 727 involved in an in-flight incident in 1979
- Ralph Gibson (fighter pilot) (1924–2009), fighter pilot
- Robert L. Gibson (born 1946), NASA astronaut
- Ward Gibson (1921–1958), American professional basketball player
- Weldon B. Gibson (1917–2001), economics researcher at SRI International
- Robert Gibson (wrestler) (born 1958), American professional wrestler
