= Hoot, Texas =

- Unincorporated community
- Location within Texas Location within the United States
- Coordinates: 33°19′45″N 94°02′55″W
- Country: United States
- State: Texas
- County: Bowie
- Elevation: 292 ft (89 m)
- Time zone: UTC-6 (Central (CST))
  - Summer (DST): UTC-5 (CDT)
- Area codes: 430 & 903
- GNIS feature ID: 1379954

Hoot is an unincorporated community in Bowie County, Texas, United States. Hoot is 6.6 miles (10.6 km) south of Texarkana.
