= Hoot Sackett =

American basketball coach

"Hoot" Sackett
Coaching career (HC unless noted)
- 1920–21: Oklahoma A&M

Head coaching record
- Overall: 14–19 (.424)

Hoot Sackett was an American college baseball coach. He was the head coach at Oklahoma State University from 1920 to 1921.

In the 1921 season his Cowboy squad played a tough schedule, eight against Missouri Valley Conference schools, two with Southwest Conference teams, and several smaller state colleges. According to a Tulsa World article from 1921 the opposition was "as stiff as any encountered by A&M in recent years".

== Head coaching record ==
Record table
Season	Team	Overall	Conference	Standing	Postseason
Oklahoma State A&M Aggies (Southwest Conference) (1920–1921)
1920	Oklahoma A&M	9–7			
1921	Oklahoma A&M	5–12			
Oklahoma A&M:		14–19 (.424)			
Total:		14–19 (.424)			
