= Huth =

Huth may refer to:

== People ==
- Huth (surname), a list of people with that name

== Places ==
- Huth, Iran, a village in Kerman Province
- Huth, Yemen, a village in San'a Governorate
- Huth District, 'Amran Governorate, Yemen

== Other uses ==
- 3203 Huth, asteroid
- Frederick Huth & Co, former British bank
