= Home-user test =

Home use tests (HUT) are product marketing tests performed in the consumer's home, contrary to central location tests. Home test are done in consumers’ homes when products are consumed over a length of time or when an authentic consumption environment is required (for example, where people may modify the product by cooking methods, adding other ingredients or using the product in a personalised manner). Typically, cleaning products, household goods, small electrodomestics, petfood and products, beauty and cosmetic products may all be tested in the home over a longer or shorter period of time. Data is collected and processed in the lab.
