= Wisconsin Ultraviolet Photo-Polarimeter Experiment =

Space telescope

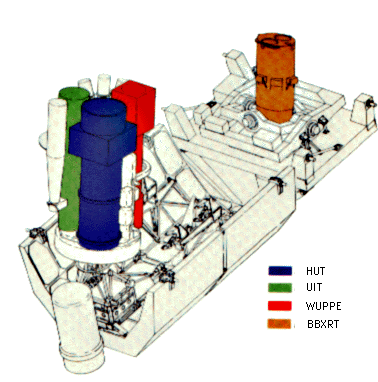
WUPPE (red) as part of the Astro-1 payload

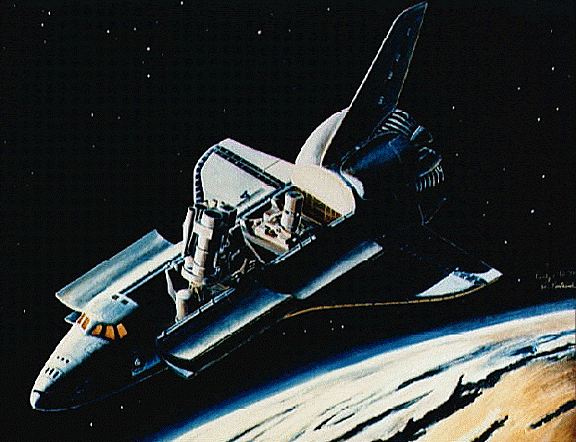
Astro-1 in the cargo bay of Space Shuttle

The Wisconsin Ultraviolet Photo-Polarimeter Experiment (WUPPE) was a space telescope with a 50cm diameter mirror for spectroscopy and polarimetry in the ultraviolet spectral range. It was used in conjunction with other telescopes on the shuttle missions STS-35 (ASTRO-1 in December 1990) and STS-67 (ASTRO-2 in March 1995).

WUPPE was developed at the University of Wisconsin and designed to record spectra in the wavelength range of 140 to 330 nm with a resolution of 0.6 nm while simultaneously measuring polarization degree and direction as a function of wavelength.

During the two shuttle missions, a total of 260 measurements of 186 heavenly objects (mainly stars) were captured. The measurements of WUPPE have, among other things, provided new insights into the properties of interstellar dust and the structure of active galactic nuclei.
