= Hopkins Ultraviolet Telescope =

Space telescope

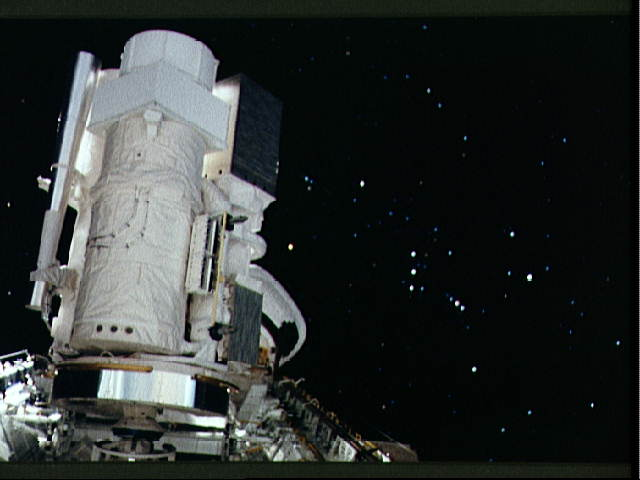
- HUT in orbit

Start of mission
- Launch date: 2 December 1990, 06:49:00 UTC
- Rocket: STS-35/STS-67
- Launch site: Kennedy Space Center
- Deployed from: Space Shuttle Columbia STS-35/Space Shuttle Endeavour STS-67

Main Ultraviolet Telescope
- Diameter: 90 cm (35 in)

The Hopkins Ultraviolet Telescope (HUT) was a space telescope designed to make spectroscopic observations in the far-ultraviolet region of the electromagnetic spectrum. It was flown into orbit on the Space Shuttle and operated from the Shuttle's payload bay on two occasions: in December 1990, as part of Shuttle mission STS-35, and in March 1995, as part of mission STS-67.

HUT was designed and built by a team based at Johns Hopkins University, led by Arthur Davidsen. The telescope consisted of a 90 cm main mirror used to focus ultraviolet light onto a spectrograph situated at the prime focus. This instrument had a spectroscopic range of 82.5 to 185 nms, and a spectral resolution of about 0.3 nm. It weighed 789 kilograms (1736 pounds).

HUT was used to observe a wide range of astrophysical sources, including supernova remnants, active galactic nuclei, cataclysmic variable stars, as well as various planets in the Solar System. During the 1990 flight, HUT was used to make 106 observations of 77 astronomical targets. During the 1995 flight, 385 observations were made of 265 targets.

HUT was co-mounted with WUPPE, Ultraviolet Imaging Telescope [UIT], and BBXRT on the Astro-1 mission (1990) and with just WUPPE and UIT on Astro-2 (in 1995).

As of January 2023, HUT is now in storage at the Smithsonian National Air and Space Museum in Washington, D.C. in the United States.
