= List of people from Colorado =

Coordinates: 38.9972°N 105.5478°W

State flag of Colorado

Location of Colorado in the United States

This is a list of some notable people who have lived in the U.S. state of Colorado. It includes people who were born, raised, or have significant relations with the state.

Coloradans have been prominent in many fields, including literature, entertainment, art, music, politics, and business. This list attempts to maintain biographical notability of significant Coloradans, and to organize historically important people hailing from Colorado.

== Actors ==
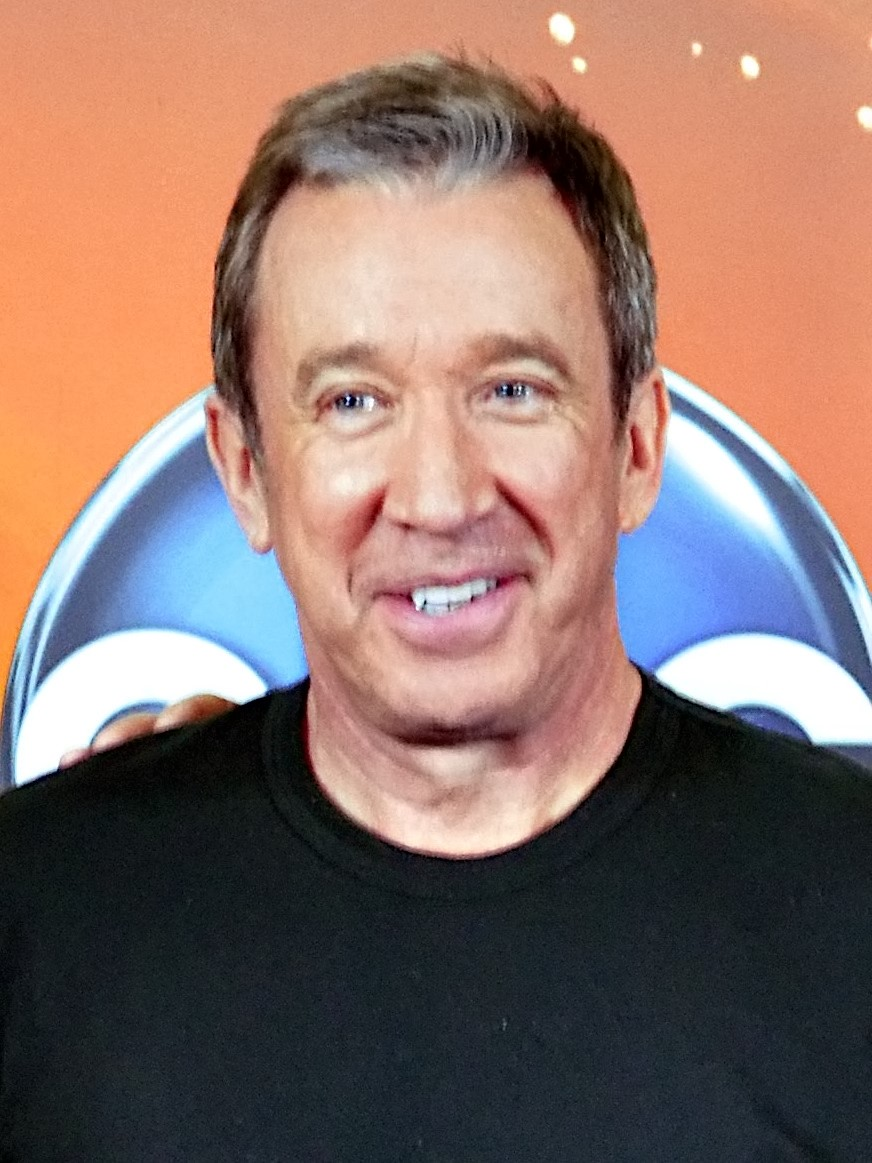
Tim Allen

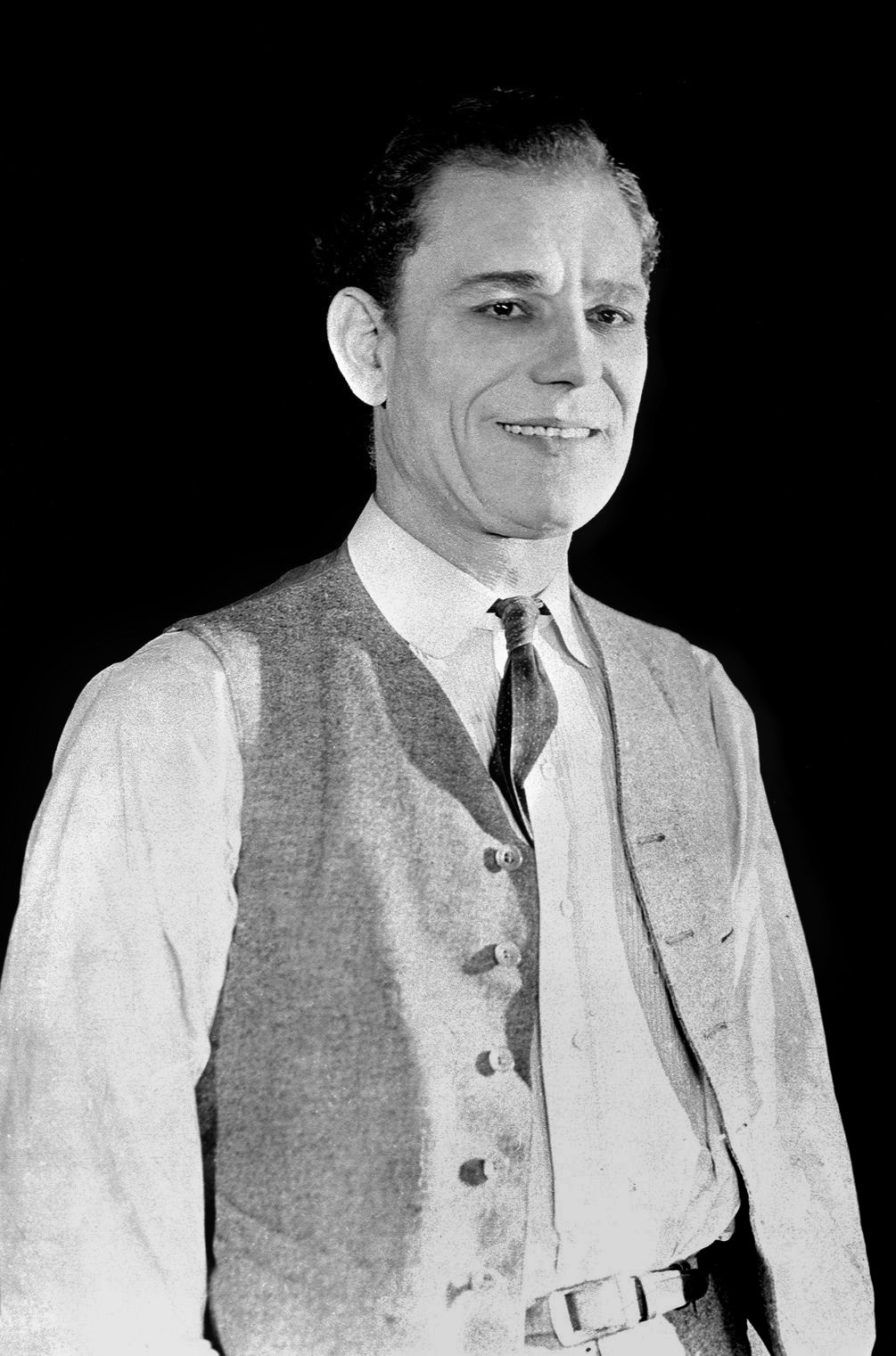
Lon Chaney

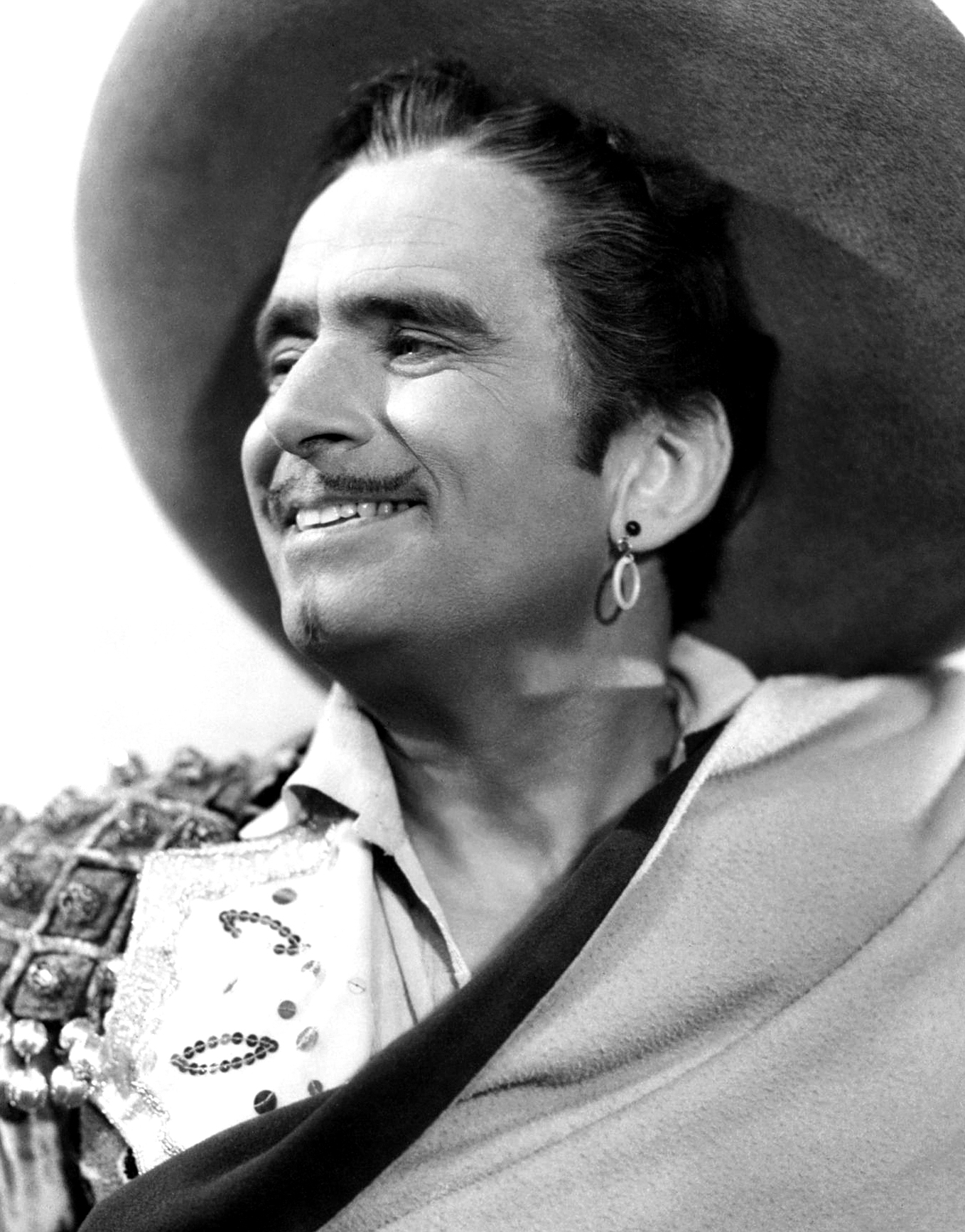
Douglas Fairbanks

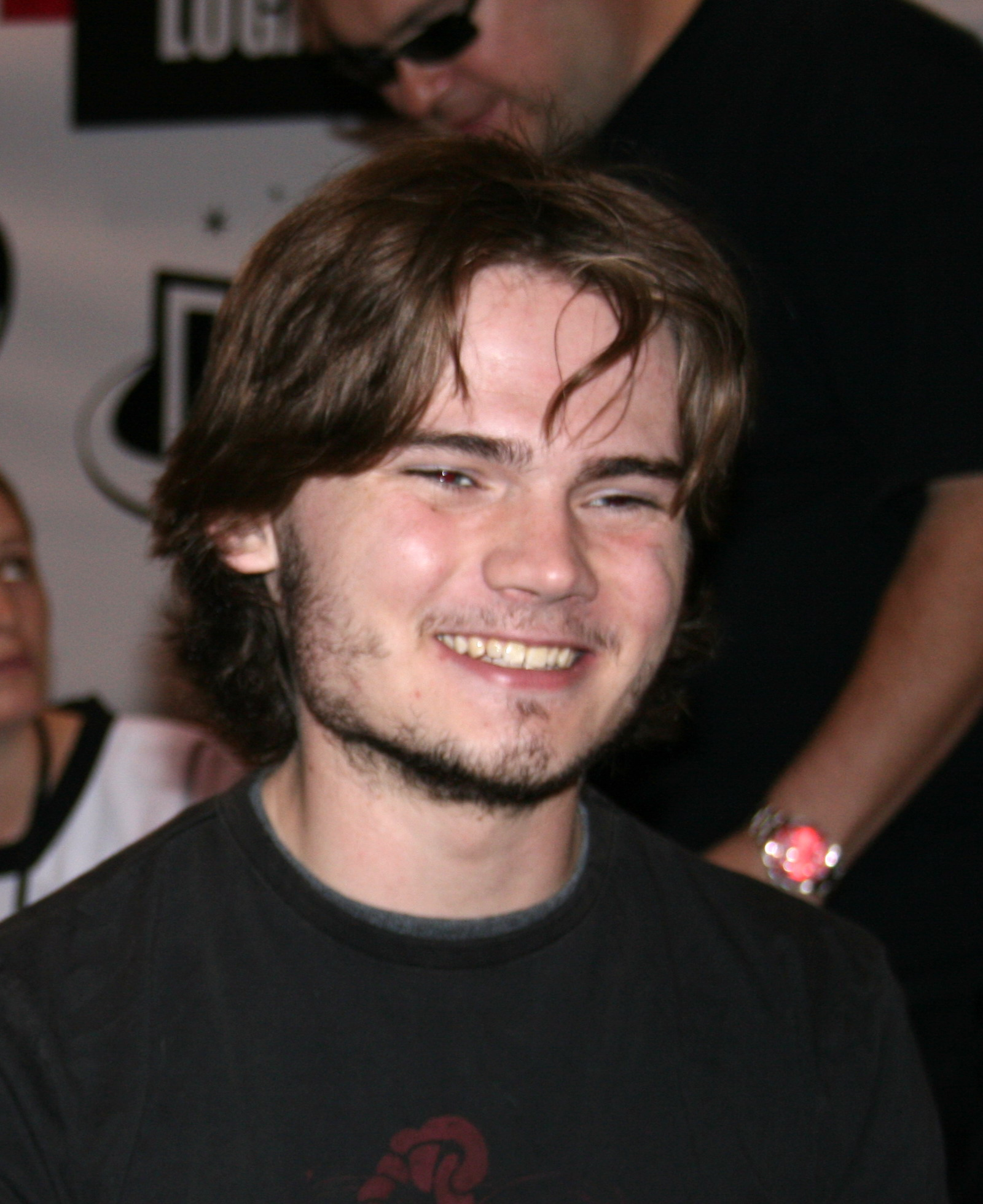
Jake Lloyd (a.k.a. young Anakin Skywalker)

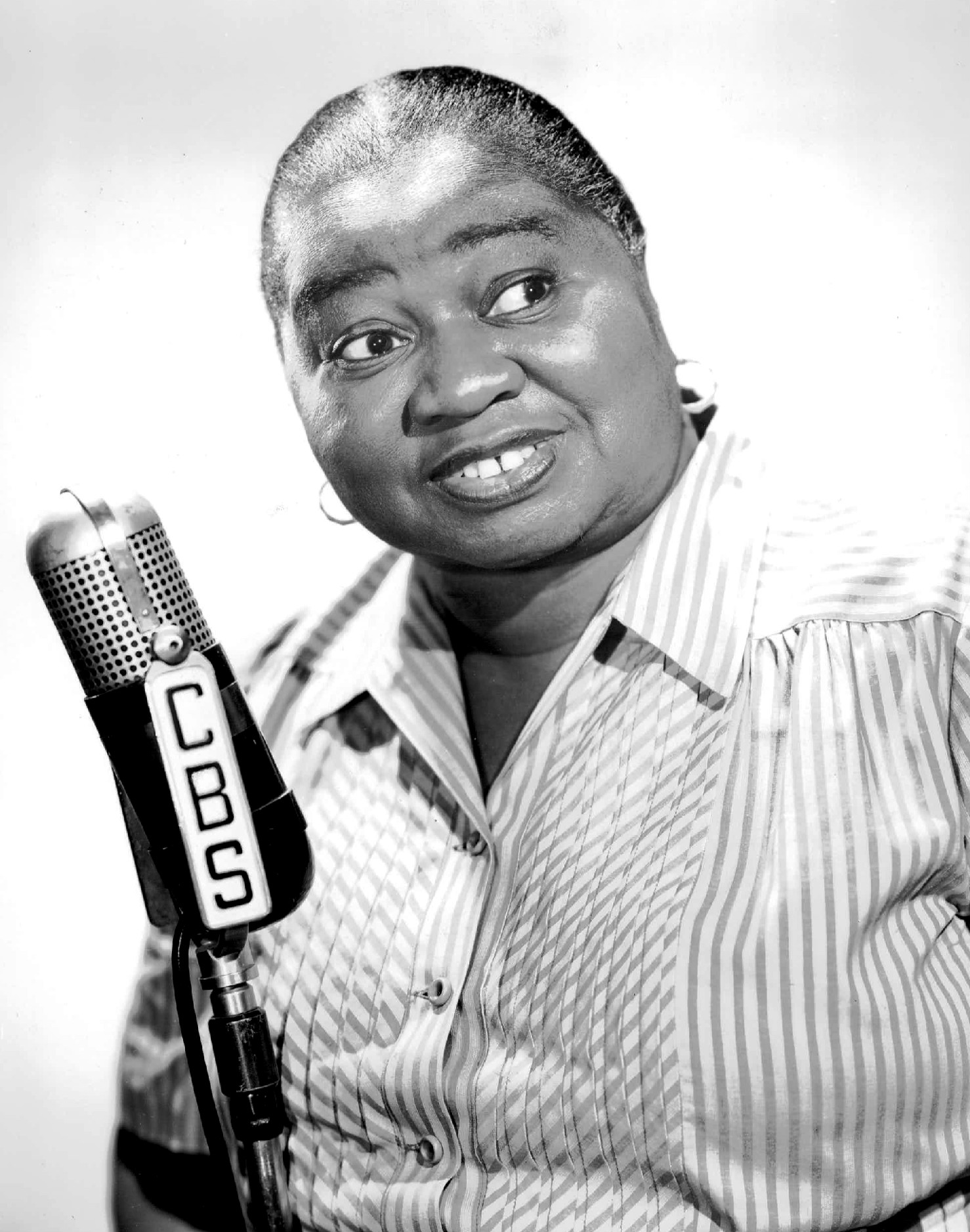
Hattie McDaniel

- Amy Adams (raised in Castle Rock, alumnus of Douglas County High School) – actress, nominated five times for an Oscar for performances in Junebug, Doubt, The Fighter, The Master and American Hustle
- Tim Allen (born in Denver) – film and television actor, comedian, winner of a Golden Globe Award (1993, nominated six times); star of The Santa Clause, Toy Story and the television series Home Improvement and Last Man Standing
- Baby Marie (real name Marie Osborne; born in Denver) – film actress and costumer, starred in numerous silent films as a child
- Roseanne Barr (lived in Denver) – film and television actress, comedian; Golden Globe Award winner, and a Primetime Emmy Award winner; starred in Roseanne and was host of The Roseanne Show
- Earl W. Bascom (cowboyed in Northwest Colorado) – film and television actor in Hollywood western The Lawless Rider and in television commercials with Roy Rogers
- Barbara Bates (born in Denver) – actress, featured in such films as All About Eve and The Caddy
- Melissa Benoist (born in Houston, Texas; raised in Littleton, Colorado – actress and singer, star of 2015 television series Supergirl
- Jessica Biel (born in MN and lived in Boulder) – film and television actress, starred in 7th Heaven and films including Easy Virtue, The Illusionist and Playing for Keeps
- Julie Bishop (born in Denver) – actress featured in many 1930s and 1940s films
- Kelly Bishop (born in Colorado Springs; raised in Denver) – film and television actress, played Emily Gilmore on Gilmore Girls
- Michael Boatman (born in Colorado Springs) – film and television actor, co-starred in such TV shows as Spin City, China Beach, Arliss
- Frank Bogert (born in Mesa, Colorado) – rodeo announcer, actor, author, mayor of Palm Springs California, Walk of Stars honoree
- Sierra Boggess (born in Denver) – actress and singer; Laurence Olivier Award and Drama Desk Award-nominated Broadway and West End soprano; originated parts of Christine Daae in Love Never Dies and Ariel in The Little Mermaid
- Tom Bower (born in Denver) – film and television actor, played Dr. Curtis Willard on The Waltons
- Jason Brooks (born in Colorado Springs) – film and television actor, played Sean Monroe on Baywatch Hawaii and Peter Blake on Days of Our Lives
- Zachery Ty Bryan (born in Aurora) – film and television actor, starred in Home Improvement
- Molly Burnett (born in Denver) – television actress, starred on Days of Our Lives
- Spring Byington (born in Colorado Springs) – actress, star of many films and television series; December Bride
- Mary Jo Catlett (born in Denver) – film and television actress, played Pearl Gallagher, the housekeeper, on Diff'rent Strokes and does the voice of Mrs. Puff on SpongeBob SquarePants
- Kristin Cavallari (born in Denver) – reality television personality and actress best known for appearing in MTV's Laguna Beach: The Real Orange County and The Hills
- Lon Chaney (born in Colorado Springs) – actor in films of 1910s and 1920s, subject of biographical film Man of a Thousand Faces
- "Baby" Lyssa Chapman (born 1987 Denver) – bounty hunter and television personality
- Beth Chapman (born in Denver) – bounty hunter and television personality
- Duane "Dog" Chapman (born 1953 in Denver) – bounty hunter and television personality
- Don Cheadle (alumnus of East High School) – actor, Oscar nominee and two-time Golden Globe Award winner, four-time Emmy Award nominee and Grammy winner; known for films Boogie Nights, Hotel Rwanda, Ocean's Eleven, The Rat Pack and Iron Man 2
- Ken Curtis (born in Las Animas; attended Colorado College in Colorado Springs) – actor, musician; starred in TV series Gunsmoke and in western films The Searchers and The Alamo
- Kristin Davis (born in Boulder) – actress, star of Sex and the City television series and films
- Brian Dietzen (lived in Boulder; attended University of Colorado Boulder) – actor, co-star of NCIS as the young Dr. Jimmy Palmer
- Thomas Doerr (lives in Boulder, Colorado) – architect, author, and educator at the University of Colorado Boulder
- Big Jack Earle (born in Denver) – silent film actor, sideshow performer and tall man
- Ralph Edwards (born in Merino) – television host and producer known for This Is Your Life and Truth or Consequences
- Chris Eigeman (born in Denver) – actor best known for Whit Stillman films Metropolitan, Barcelona, and The Last Days of Disco; starred in ABC's It's Like, You Know... and played Jason Stiles on Gilmore Girls
- Douglas Fairbanks (born in Denver, attended East High School and the Colorado School of Mines) – film actor, first president of the Academy of Motion Picture Arts and Sciences (1927–1929), posthumous winner of an honorary Academy Award (1940) and star of numerous films during the 1910s and 1920s
- David Fincher (born in Denver) – director of such films as Zodiac, Fight Club, Seven and Gone Girl
- Joel Geist (born in Denver) – film and television actor
- Jacque Georgia (lives in Aurora) – actress, author, Mrs. Colorado United States 2019
- Pam Grier (attended East High School in Denver) – actress, star of films including Foxy Brown and Jackie Brown
- Devon Gummersall (born in Durango) – film television actor, played Brian Kraków on ABC's teen drama My So-Called Life
- Jon Heder (born in Fort Collins) – actor, played title character in Napoleon Dynamite
- Michael "Ffish" Hemschoot (born in Parker) – director, animator and visual effects artist in films
- Kelo Henderson (born in Pueblo) – co-starred in 1957–1959 syndicated western television series 26 Men, based on case files of Arizona Rangers law-enforcement team
- Gregg Henry (born in Lakewood) – film and television actor, known for his roles in Guardians of the Galaxy, Payback, Body Double and Slither, as well as playing Hollis Doyle on Scandal
- Neil Hopkins (lived in Aurora; attended Regis Jesuit High School) – film and television actor
- Steve Howey (lived in Lakewood); attended Green Mountain High School – film and television actor, played Van on Reba television show and has been in various films, including Bride Wars
- Olin Howland (born in Denver) – film and television actor
- Matt Iseman (born in Denver) – comedian, actor, television host, and winner of The New Celebrity Apprentice
- Daniel Junge (lives in Denver) – Academy Award-winning documentary filmmaker
- Brandy Ledford (born in Denver) – actress, model, former Penthouse Pet of the Year; played Dawn Masterton on Baywatch and Doyle on Andromeda
- Sheryl Lee (grew up in Boulder, alumnus of Fairview High School) – film and television actress, played Laura Palmer and Maddy Ferguson on Twin Peaks and Dr. Sarah Church on L.A. Doctors
- Jake Lloyd (born in Fort Collins) – film actor, played young Anakin Skywalker on Star Wars: Episode I – The Phantom Menace
- Scott Lowell (born in Denver) – film and television actor, starred in Queer as Folk
- John Carroll Lynch (born in Boulder) – actor, starred in films including Zodiac and The Founder
- Ross Lynch – born in Littleton, Colorado: actor and singer, recurring character on TV series Chilling Adventures of Sabrina
- Ross Marquand – born in Fort Collins, Colorado; attended University of Colorado Boulder) – actor, recurring main character of TV series The Walking Dead
- Hattie McDaniel (lived in Fort Collins and Denver, attended East High School) – film and television actress, winner of an Academy Award (1940) for Gone with the Wind
- T. J. Miller (born in Denver) – actor and stand-up comedian, voice of Tuffnut in How to Train Your Dragon and Ranger Jones in Yogi Bear, played Hud in Cloverfield
- Bill Murray (attended Regis University in Denver) – film and television actor, comedian, starred in Saturday Night Live, Ghostbusters, Caddyshack, Rushmore, and Lost in Translation
- Tracey Needham (grew up in Denver) – film and television actress, appeared as Paige Thatcher on Life Goes On, Lt. Meg Austin on JAG, and as Inspector Candace "C. D." DeLorenzo on The Division
- Cyrus Nowrasteh (born in Boulder) – screenwriter and director for theatrical films, television films and shows; notable works include the miniseries The Path to 9/11, the drama The Stoning of Soraya M., and the television film The Day Reagan Was Shot
- Stephen Thomas Ochsner – actor, director, musician, artist, translator and producer
- Peter O'Fallon (born in Denver) – film and television director, created NBC sci-fi/drama series Mysterious Ways, directed such films as Suicide Kings and A Rumor of Angels
- Debra Paget (born in Denver) – actress, star of films including The Ten Commandments and Love Me Tender
- Trey Parker (born in Conifer, alumnus of Evergreen High School, attended University of Colorado Boulder) – actor, animator, director, producer, musician, screenwriter; nominated for an Academy Award (2000) and winner of two Emmy Awards (2005 and 2007, nominated seven times); co-creator of South Park
- Antoinette Perry (born in Denver) – stage actress and director, co-founder of the American Theatre Wing, posthumous namesake of the Antoinette Perry Awards for Excellence in Theatre, better known as the Tony Awards
- Amanda Peterson (born in 1971 in Greeley) – film and television actress, starred in Can't Buy Me Love
- Cassandra Peterson (also known as Elvira; lived in Colorado Springs, alumnus of Palmer High School) – film and television actress, starred in Elvira, Mistress of the Dark
- Joseph C. Phillips (born in Denver) – actor, played Lt. Martin Kendall on The Cosby Show
- Denver Pyle (born in Bethune) – actor featured in films including Bonnie and Clyde and on television; played Uncle Jesse in The Dukes of Hazzard
- Brandon Quinn (born in Aurora) – actor, starred as Tommy Dawkins in Big Wolf on Campus
- Kelly Reno (born in Pueblo) – actor, starred in film The Black Stallion and its sequel
- Kristen Renton (born in Denver) – actress, played Morgan Hollingsworth on Days of Our Lives
- AnnaSophia Robb (born in Denver) – film and television actress, starred in Charlie and the Chocolate Factory and Bridge to Terabithia
- Mark Roberts (born in Denver) – actor who appeared in over 100 films
- Karly Rothenberg (born in Denver) – film and television actress
- Barbara Rush (born in Denver) – actress, star of films including The Young Philadelphians, The Young Lions, Bigger Than Life, Robin and the 7 Hoods and Hombre
- Kristen Schaal (born in Longmont) – actress and comedian, played Mel on Flight of the Conchords and Louise on Bob's Burgers
- Charity Shea (born in Denver) – actress, starred as Samantha Best on teen drama The Best Years
- Matt Stone (lived in Denver and Littleton, alumnus of Heritage High School and the University of Colorado Boulder) – actor, musician, producer, writer; winner of two Emmy Awards (2005 and 2007, nominated seven times); co-creator of South Park
- Sherry Stringfield (born in Colorado Springs) – actress, starred in TV series ER
- Tom Tully (born in Durango) – film and television actor, nominated for an Academy Award in 1955 for The Caine Mutiny, starred in CBS's police drama, The Lineup and co-starred in ABC's western TV series Shane in 1966
- Jan-Michael Vincent (born in Denver) – film and television actor, played helicopter pilot Stringfellow Hawke on 1980s series Airwolf (1984–1986)
- Frank Welker (born in Denver) – voice actor, played Fred in Scooby-Doo and Nibbler in Futurama
- David White (born in Denver) – film and television actor, featured in TV series Bewitched
- Sheree J. Wilson (lived in Boulder) – actress, played Alex Cahill in TV series Walker, Texas Ranger

== Artists, photographers ==
- Robert Adams (lived in Colorado) – photographer of the western landscape; received two Guggenheim Fellowships, a MacArthur Fellowship; works are in the permanent collection of the Museum of Modern Art in New York
- Earl W. Bascom (lived in Colorado) – artist, sculptor, cousin of western artist Frederic Remington, lived and worked in Northwest Colorado during the late 1920s
- John Fabian Carlson (lived in Colorado Springs) – painter, director and an instructor at the Broadmoor Academy, a precursor to the current Colorado Springs Fine Arts Center and founder of the John F. Carlson School of Landscape Painting
- Tomory Dodge (born in Denver; alumnus of South High School – artist, paintings in public collections including the Whitney Museum of American Art and the Smithsonian American Art Museum
- Jess E. DuBois (born in Denver) – artist, advocate of Indian art
- John Fielder – landscape photographer and nature writer
- William Henry Jackson (lived in Denver) – photographer for the United States Geological Survey and Union Pacific Railroad, created one of the largest and most expansive western photographic collections in the world
- Frank Tenney Johnson – western artist related to artists Frederic Remington and Earl Bascom, lived and cowboyed near Hayden
- Barry Kooser (born in Wheat Ridge; alumnus of Arvada West High School) – Disney artist, fine art painter and CCO of Worker Studio
- David Burroughs Mattingly (born in Fort Collins) – illustrator and painter known for book covers of science fiction and fantasy literature
- Amanda Marie Ploegsma – known as Amanda Marie (born in the Netherlands, lives in Colorado) – artist, alumna of Rocky Mountain College of Art and Design, stencilist of storybook imagery in contemporary murals and paintings
- Robert Reid (lived in Colorado Springs) – painter, instructor at the School of the Museum of Fine Arts, Boston, the Cooper Union, and the Broadmoor Academy
- Wendi Schneider (lives in Denver) – Denver-based photographer of nature and wildlife; often prints on paper vellum with hand-applied layers of gold leaf

== Astronauts ==
- Loren Acton (born 1936) – mission specialist on STS-51-F
- Jeffrey Ashby (born 1954) – pilot of STS-93 and STS-100; commander of STS-112
- Patrick Baudry (born 1946) – payload specialist on STS-51-G
- John E. Blaha (born 1942) – pilot of STS-29 and STS-33; commander of STS-43 and STS-58; Mission Specialist on STS-79, STS-81, and Mir space station
- Michael J. Bloomfield (born 1959) – pilot of STS-86 and STS-97; commander of STS-110
- Karol J. Bobko (born 1935) – pilot of STS-6; commander of STS-51-D and STS-51-J
- Eric A. Boe (born 1964) – pilot of STS-126
- Vance D. Brand (born 1931) – Mercury astronaut; Apollo docking module pilot on the Apollo–Soyuz Test Project; commander of STS-5, STS-41-B, and STS-35
- Roy D. Bridges Jr. (born 1943) – pilot of STS-51-F; director of the Kennedy Space Center (1997–2003); director of Langley Research Center (2003–2005)
- Curtis Brown (born 1956) – pilot of STS-47, STS-66, and STS-77; commander of STS-85, STS-95, and STS-103
- Scott Carpenter (1925–2013) – pilot of Mercury-Atlas 7 (Aurora 7); fourth human to orbit the Earth (1962)
- Gerald P. Carr (1932–2020) – commander of Skylab 4 (1973–1974)
- John Casper (born 1943) – pilot of STS-36; commander of STS-54, STS-62, and STS-77
- Kalpana Chawla (1961–2003) – mission specialist on STS-87 and STS-107; killed on February 1, 2003, on the reentry of the Space Shuttle Columbia
- Kevin P. Chilton (born 1954) – pilot of STS-49 and STS-59; commander of STS-76
- Mary L. Cleave (born 1947) – mission specialist on STS-61-B and STS-30
- Gordon Cooper (1927–2004) – pilot of Mercury-Atlas 9 (Faith 7); command pilot of Gemini V
- Richard O. Covey (born 1946) – pilot of STS-51-I and STS-26; commander of STS-38 and STS-61
- Takao Doi (born 1954) – mission specialist on STS-87
- B. Alvin Drew (born 1962) – mission specialist on STS-118
- Brian Duffy (born 1953) – pilot of STS-45 and STS-57; commander of STS-72 and STS-92
- Samuel T. Durrance (born 1943) – payload specialist on STS-35 and STS-67
- James Dutton (born 1968) – pilot of STS-131
- Martin J. Fettman (born 1956) – payload specialist on STS-58
- Dale Gardner (1948–2014) – mission specialist on STS-8 and STS-51-A
- Guy Gardner (born 1948) – pilot of STS-27 and STS-35
- Ronald J. Grabe (born 1945) – pilot of STS-51-J and STS-30; commander of STS-42 and STS-57
- Frederick D. Gregory (born 1941) – pilot of STS-51-B; commander of STS-33 and STS-44
- William G. Gregory (born 1957) – pilot of STS-67
- Sidney M. Gutierrez (born 1951) – pilot of STS-40; commander of STS-59
- James D. Halsell (born 1956) – pilot of STS-65 and STS-74; commander of STS-83, STS-94, and STS-101
- L. Blaine Hammond (born 1952) – pilot of STS-39 and STS-64
- Susan J. Helms (born 1958) – mission specialist on STS-54, STS-64, STS-78, STS-101, STS-102, and STS-105; flight engineer of International Space Station Expedition 2 (2001)
- Terence T. Henricks (born 1952) – pilot of STS-44 and STS-55; commander of STS-70 and STS-78
- John Herrington (born 1958) – mission specialist on STS-113
- Richard Hieb (born 1955) – mission specialist on STS-39, STS-49, and STS-65
- James Irwin (1930–1991) – lunar module pilot on Apollo 15; eighth human to walk on the Moon (1971)
- Marsha Ivins (born 1951) – mission specialist on STS-32, STS-46, STS-62, STS-81, and STS-98
- Gregory H. Johnson (born 1962) – pilot of STS-123 and STS-134
- Thomas D. Jones (born 1955) – mission specialist on STS-59, STS-80, and STS-98; payload commander on STS-68
- James M. Kelly (born 1964) – pilot of STS-102 and STS-114
- Kevin R. Kregel (born 1956) – pilot of STS-70 and STS-78; commander of STS-87 and STS-99
- Mark C. Lee (born 1952) – mission specialist on STS-30, STS-64, and STS-82; payload commander of STS-47
- Kjell N. Lindgren (born 1973) – flight engineer and mission specialist on International Space Station Expedition 44 and Expedition 45
- Steven W. Lindsey (born 1960) – pilot of STS-87 and STS-95; commander of STS-104 and STS-121
- John M. Lounge (1946–2011) – mission specialist on STS-51-I, STS-26, and STS-35
- Bruce McCandless II (1937–2017)
- Donald R. McMonagle (born 1952) – mission specialist on STS-39; pilot of STS-54; commander of STS-66
- Dorothy Metcalf-Lindenburger (born 1975) – mission specialist on STS-131
- George Nelson (born 1950) – mission specialist on STS-41-C, STS-61-C, and STS-26
- Ellison Onizuka (1946–1986) – mission specialist on STS-51-C and STS-51-L; killed on January 28, 1986, on the ascent of the Space Shuttle Challenger
- William A. Pailes (born 1952) – payload specialist on STS-51-J
- Scott E. Parazynski (born 1961) – payload specialist on STS-66; mission specialist on STS-86, STS-95, STS-100, and STS-120
- Charles J. Precourt (born 1955) – mission specialist on STS-55; pilot of STS-71; commander of STS-84 and STS-91
- Kent Rominger (born 1956) – pilot of STS-73, STS-80, and STS-85; commander of STS-96 and STS-100
- Stuart Roosa (1933–1994) – command module pilot on Apollo 14; eleventh human to orbit the Moon (1971)
- Richard A. Searfoss (1956–2018) – pilot of STS-58 and STS-76; commander of STS-90
- Ronald M. Sega (born 1952) – mission specialist on STS-60 and STS-76
- Loren Shriver (born 1944) – pilot of STS-41-B; commander of STS-31 and STS-46
- Robert L. Stewart (born 1942) – mission specialist on STS-41-C and STS-51-J
- Steven Swanson (born 1960) – mission specialist on STS-117 and STS-119, International Space Station expeditions 39 and 40
- Jack Swigert (1931–1982) – command module pilot on Apollo 13 mission; orbited the Moon; elected to the United States Congress, but died before taking office
- Joseph R. Tanner (born 1950) – mission specialist on STS-66, STS-82, STS-97, and STS-115
- James van Hoften (born 1944) – mission specialist on STS-41-C and STS-51-I
- Charles L. Veach (1944–1995) – mission specialist on STS-39 and STS-52
- Terry W. Virts (born 1967) – pilot of STS-130
- James Voss (born 1949) – mission specialist on STS-44, STS-53, STS-69, STS-101, STS-102, and STS-105; flight engineer of International Space Station Expedition 2 (2001)

== Athletes ==
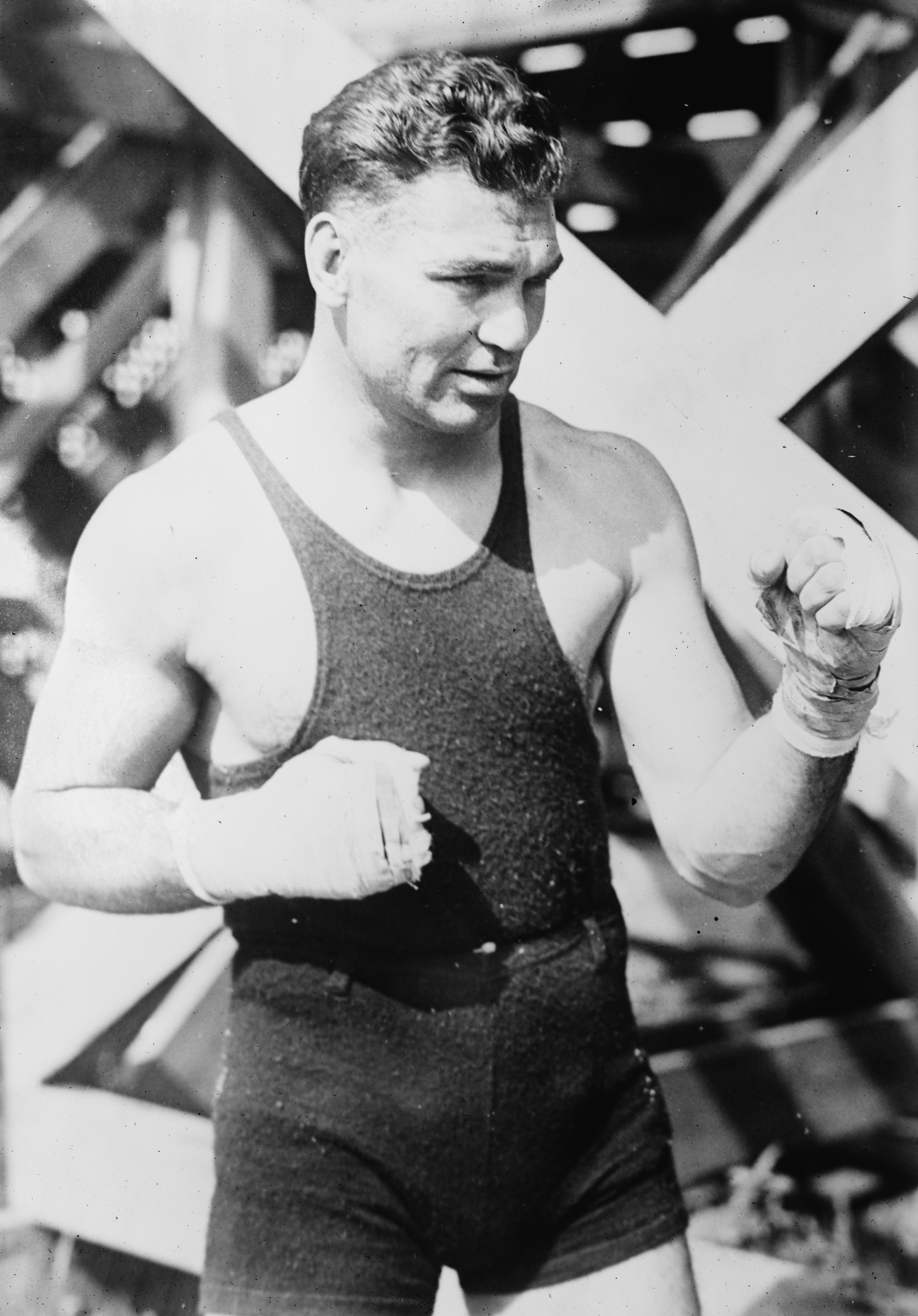
Jack Dempsey

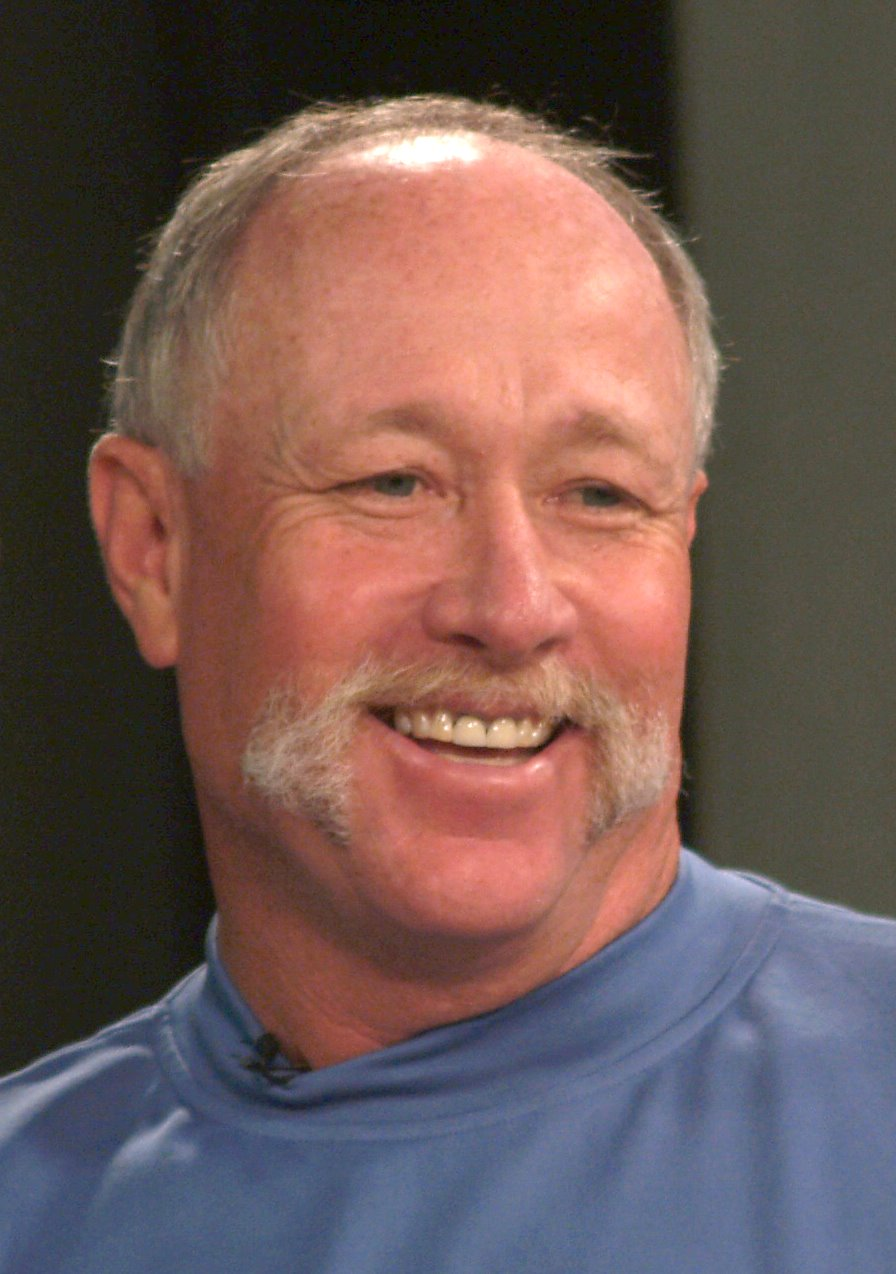
Goose Gossage

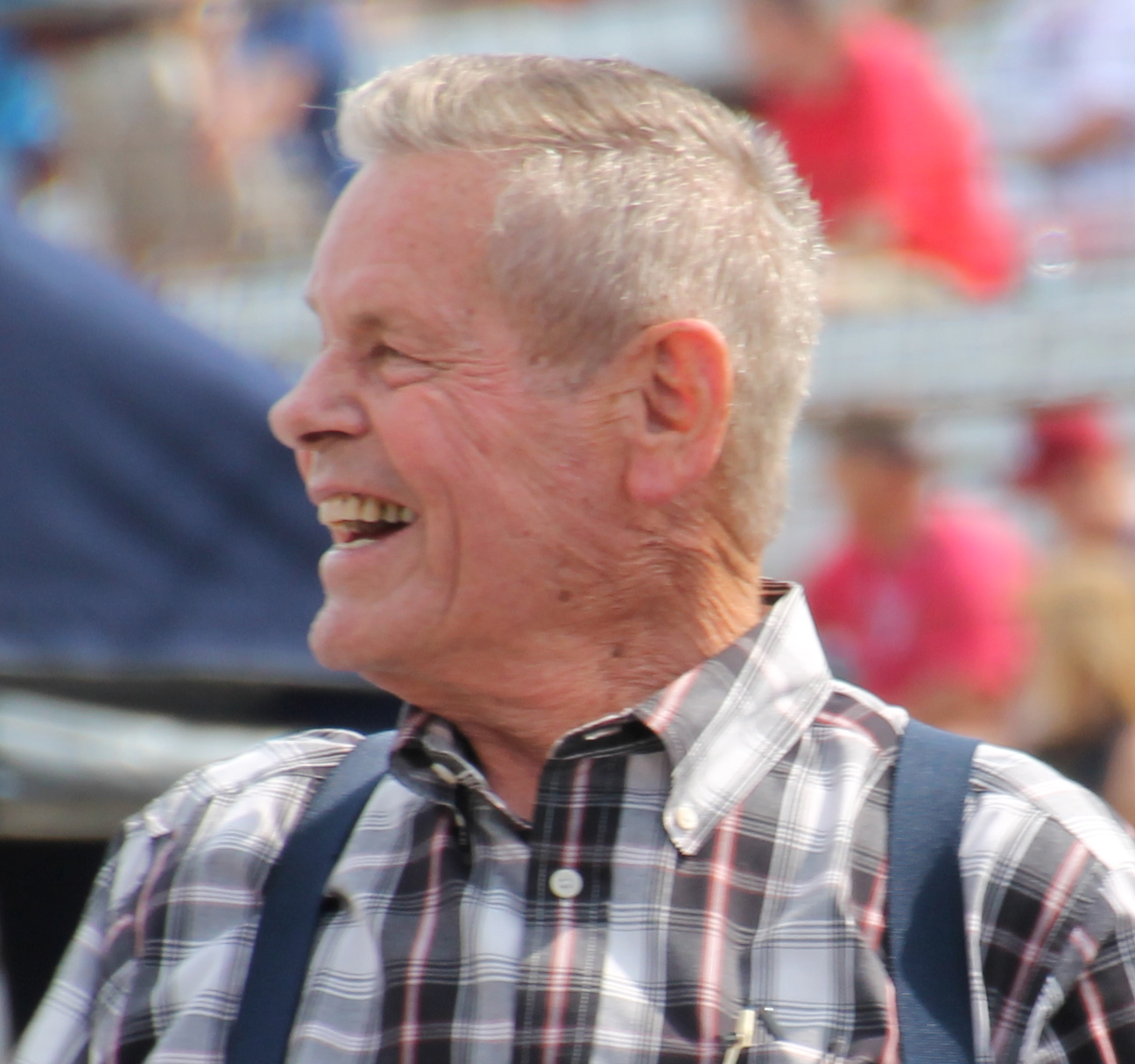
Bobby Unser

- David Aardsma (lived in Greenwood Village; alumnus of Cherry Creek High School) – Major League Baseball pitcher
- Max Aaron (born in Arizona, lives in Colorado Springs) – 2013 U.S. national champion figure skater
- Louis Amundson (raised in Boulder, alumnus of Monarch High School) – pro basketball player
- Heather Armbrust (lives in Wheat Ridge) – IFBB professional bodybuilder
- Tom Ashworth (born in Denver, alumnus of Cherry Creek High School and University of Colorado Boulder) – NFL player, member of three NFL Super Bowl champion teams (Super Bowls XXXVI, XXXVIII and XXXIX) with New England Patriots
- Buddy Baer (born in Denver) – boxer and actor, brother of Max Baer
- Kalen Ballage (born in Peyton) – running back for the Miami Dolphins
- Josh Bard (born in Ithaca, New York, moved to Greenwood Village; alumnus of Cherry Creek High School) – MLB catcher and coach
- Earl W. Bascom (lived in Colorado) – rodeo champion and Hall of Famer, invented rodeo's first hornless bronc saddle and fone-hand bareback rigging, called "father of modern rodeo", lived on White Bear Ranch in Northwest Colorado, married cousin of Jack Dempsey
- Chauncey Billups (born and raised in Denver, alumnus of George Washington High School and University of Colorado Boulder) – NBA player for Denver Nuggets, Los Angeles Clippers and champion Detroit Pistons team (2004); selected as MVP of NBA Finals (2004), three-time NBA All-Star
- Greg Bird (raised in Aurora; alumnus of Grandview High School) – first baseman for New York Yankees
- Ben Bishop (born in Denver) – National Hockey League goaltender
- Jeremy Bloom (born in Loveland; alumnus of Loveland High School and University of Colorado Boulder) – Olympic and world champion freestyle moguls skier, played football for University of Colorado and in NFL
- Tony Boselli (raised in Boulder; alumnus of Fairview High School in Boulder) – offensive lineman for USC, second selection of 1995 NFL draft; All Pro for Jacksonville Jaguars
- Ronnie Bradford (lived in Commerce City; alumnus of Adams City High School and University of Colorado at Boulder) – NFL player (1993–2002) for four teams; former special teams coach of Denver Broncos
- William Glenn Brundige (from Holyoke) – former NFL defensive end
- Calais Campbell (born and raised in Denver, alumnus of South High School in Denver, Colorado) – NFL defensive end
- Joe Barry Carroll (raised in Denver, alumnus of East High School in Denver) – basketball player for Purdue, first selection of 1980 NBA draft, center and NBA All Star
- Donald "Cowboy" Cerrone (born and raised in Denver) – mixed martial artist, UFC Hall of Famer and actor
- Tom Chambers (alumnus of Fairview High School in Boulder) – basketball player, 4-time NBA All Star
- Alysha Clark (born 1987) – American-Israeli basketball player for the Dallas Wings of the Women's National Basketball Association (WNBA)
- E.H. "Dutch" Clark (born in Fowler); alumnus of Pueblo Central High School and Colorado College) – Colorado's first All-American football player; player and coach for Detroit Lions in 1930s; charter member of Pro Football Hall of Fame
- Jon Cooper (born in Fort Collins; alumnus of Fort Collins High School) – center for Minnesota Vikings
- John Coughlin (1985–2019) – figure skater
- Jesse Crain (lived in Boulder; alumnus of Fairview High School) – MLB relief pitcher
- Mason Crosby (alumni of University of Colorado) – former NFL kicker
- Hayden Dalton (born 1996) – basketball player for Russian club Uralmash Yekaterinburg
- Drew Davis (born in Denver) – wide receiver for Atlanta Falcons
- Pat Day (born in Brush) – Hall of Fame jockey, Kentucky Derby winner
- Joe DeCamillis (born in Arvada) – former special teams coach for Denver Broncos, currently with Las Vegas Raiders
- Jack Dempsey (born in Manassa) – professional boxer, nicknamed "the Manassa Mauler", regarded as boxing's World Heavyweight Champion 1919–1926 Inducted into the International Boxing Hall of Fame (1990); author of two books relating to hand-to-hand combat
- Reed Doughty (born in Greeley; alumnus of Theodore Roosevelt High School in Johnstown, Colorado) – safety for Washington Redskins
- Joel Dreessen (lived in Fort Morgan; alumnus of Fort Morgan High School) – NFL tight end
- Justin Drescher (born in Colorado Springs) – long snapper for New Orleans Saints
- John Elway (lives in Englewood) – NFL quarterback (1984–1999) for Denver Broncos, member of two Super Bowl champion teams (Super Bowls XXXII and XXXIII), selected as NFL MVP (1987), MVP of Super Bowl XXXIII, twice as UPI AFC Offensive Player of the Year (1987 and 1993), five times for AP NFL All-Pro team, nine-time Pro Bowl selection; Denver Broncos Ring of Fame (1999), College Football Hall of Fame (2000), and Pro Football Hall of Fame (2004), vice president and general manager of Broncos
- Alex English (lived in Denver) – NBA player (1976–1991) with Milwaukee Bucks, Indiana Pacers, Denver Nuggets and Dallas Mavericks, assistant coach with Toronto Raptors, seven-time NBA All-Star, inducted into Basketball Hall of Fame (1997)
- Brian Fisher (born in Denver, lives in Aurora) – Major League Baseball pitcher with New York Yankees and Pittsburgh Pirates
- Ingals Fisher (1909–1942, born in Lyons) – sport shooter
- Peter Foley (born 1965 or 1966) – former snowboarding coach; suspended for 10 years for sexual misconduct
- Missy Franklin (resides in Centennial) – five-time Olympic gold medalist in swimming, attended Regis Jesuit High School, and swam collegiality at UCLA
- Ben Garland (born in Grand Junction; alumnus of Central High School) – offensive guard for the Atlanta Falcons
- Kevin Gausman (born in Centennial; alumnus of Grandview High School in Aurora) – Major League Baseball pitcher for the Atlanta Braves
- Brian Ginsberg (born 1966, lived in Denver) – gymnast, two-time US junior national gymnastics champion
- Arielle Gold (born and lives in Steamboat Springs) – snowboarder; Olympic bronze medalist, Junior World Champion, and World Champion
- Taylor Gold (born and lives in Steamboat Springs) – Olympic snowboarder
- Richard "Goose" Gossage (born in Colorado Springs, lives in Highlands Ranch) – Major League Baseball pitcher (1972–1994) for nine teams; member of 1978 World Series champion New York Yankees, 12-time All-Star, inducted into National Baseball Hall of Fame (2008)
- Daniel Graham (raised in Denver; attended Thomas Jefferson High School) – NFL tight end
- Robert Griswold (born 1996) – swimmer
- Roy Halladay (born in Denver, raised in Arvada) – MLB starting pitcher, won AL Cy Young Award in 2003, NL Cy Young Award in 2010; eight-time All-Star
- Matt Hasselbeck (born in Boulder) – quarterback for four NFL teams, selected three times to Pro Bowl, commentator
- Chase Headley (born in Fountain; alumnus of Fountain-Fort Carson High School) – third baseman for the New York Yankees
- Lindsey Heaps (born in Golden) – soccer player, midfielder for the Denver Summit, captain of the USWNT, World Cup winner, Olympic gold medalist
- Phil Heath (lives in Arvada) – bodybuilder, twice Mr. Olympia
- Taryn Hemmings (born in Greeley) – professional soccer player for Chicago Red Stars and Boston Breakers, played in Japan for Tepco Mareeze and in Australia for Canberra United, all-time leading Division 1 scorer for University of Denver
- Jordan Hicks (born in Colorado Springs) – linebacker for Philadelphia Eagles
- Sarah Hirshland (born 1975) – chief executive officer of the United States Olympic Committee
- Luke Hochevar (born in Denver) – relief pitcher for Kansas City Royals
- Noah Hoffman (born 1989) – Olympic skier
- Lamarr Houston (raised in Colorado Springs; attended Thomas B. Doherty High School) – defensive end for Oakland Raiders
- Danny Jackson (lived in Aurora; graduated from Aurora Central High School) – baseball player, pitcher for KC Royals, Cincinnati Reds, Chicago Cubs
- Reggie Jackson (lived in Colorado Springs; attended Palmer High School) – basketball player for NBA's Oklahoma City Thunder
- Vincent Jackson (born and raised in Colorado Springs; attended Widefield High School and University of Northern Colorado) – wide receiver for San Diego Chargers and Tampa Bay Buccaneers
- Ryan Jensen (born in Rangely and reared in Fort Morgan; attended Fort Morgan High School and Colorado State University Pueblo) – offensive lineman for Baltimore Ravens, sixth-round pick of the 2013 NFL draft
- Dirk Johnson (raised in Montrose, graduate of Montrose High School and University of Northern Colorado) – NFL punter
- Seth Jones (born in Arlington, Texas, but lived in Denver) – plays defense in NHL currently with Columbus Blue Jackets
- Jonathan Kaye (born in Denver) – professional golfer on PGA Tour
- Ronald Kiefel (lives in Wheat Ridge, born in Boulder) – bronze medal Olympic winner for road cycling, raced in Tour de France 7 times
- Dalton Knecht (raised in Thornton, attended the University of Northern Colorado) – NBA small forward for the Los Angeles Lakers and New York Knicks
- Mark Knudson (born in Denver, alumnus of Colorado State University) – Major League Baseball pitcher, first Colorado native to play for the Colorado Rockies
- Kevin Kouzmanoff (lived in Evergreen, alumnus of Evergreen High School) – Major League Baseball player for Colorado Rockies
- Oliver Larraz (born in Denver) – soccer player
- Buddy Lazier (born in Vail) – auto racing driver, winner of Indy Racing League championship (2000) and Indianapolis 500 (1996) – awarded Indianapolis Motor Speedway's Scott Brayton Trophy (2003)
- Brad Lidge (attended Cherry Creek High School in Greenwood Village and lives in Englewood) – relief pitcher for Philadelphia Phillies, Houston Astros
- Phillip Lindsay – (raised in Aurora, Colorado, Denver South High School alumnus, and former University of Colorado Boulder running back) current National Football League running back
- Jacob Lissek (born 1992) – soccer player
- Phil Loadholt (lived in Fountain; alumnus of Fountain-Fort Carson High School) – offensive tackle for the Minnesota Vikings
- Dave Logan (attended Wheat Ridge High School and University of Colorado) – drafted to three professional sports (football, basketball and baseball); wide receiver for Cleveland Browns and Denver Broncos; radio personality on KOA; coached high school football teams for Arvada West High School, Chatfield Senior High School, Mullen High School, Cherry Creek High School to state championships
- Brian Matusz (born in Grand Junction) – relief pitcher for Baltimore Orioles
- Christian McCaffrey (born in Castle Rock, alumnus of Valor Christian High School in Highlands Ranch, Colorado) – NFL running back for the San Francisco 49ers
- Brandon McCarthy (lived in Colorado Springs, attended Cheyenne Mountain High School) – MLB pitcher for Atlanta Braves
- Darnell McDonald (born in Fort Collins) – attended Cherry Creek High School) – outfielder for Boston Red Sox
- Mark Melancon (born in Wheat Ridge, attended Golden High School) – closer for Atlanta Braves
- Bill Musgrave (raised in Grand Junction) – graduate of Grand Junction High School, football player for Dallas Cowboys, San Francisco 49ers and Denver Broncos, offensive coordinator for Minnesota Vikings
- Jesse Nading (born in Highlands Ranch; alumnus of ThunderRidge High School) – defensive end for Houston Texans
- David Pauley (born in Longmont) – relief pitcher for Detroit Tigers, Boston Red Sox
- Erik Pears (alumnus of John F. Kennedy High School in Denver) – offensive tackle for San Francisco 49ers
- Jake Pemberton (born 1996) – American-Israeli basketball player in the Israeli National League
- Tyler Polumbus (born in Denver) – offensive tackle for Denver Broncos
- Alina Popa (lives in Lakewood) – IFBB professional bodybuilder
- Mike Purcell (born in Highlands Ranch; alumnus of Highlands Ranch High School) – defensive end for San Francisco 49ers
- Sam Raben – soccer player
- Micheal Ray Richardson (raised in Denver, alumnus of Manual High School in Denver) – NBA All Star point guard
- Ryan Max Riley (raised in Winter Park and Steamboat Springs, alumnus of Lowell Whiteman School in Steamboat Springs) – national champion mogul skier on US Ski Team
- Dalton Risner (born in Wiggins, Colorado) – current National Football League guard for the Cincinnati Bengals
- Taylor Rogers (born in Littleton) – closer for the Minnesota Twins
- Kevin Russo (born in West Babylon, New York, moved to Boulder; attended Fairview High School) – baseball player for New York Yankees
- Jeff Salzenstein (born 1973; lived in Englewood) – tennis player
- Bob Sapp (born in Colorado Springs) – kickboxer, attended Mitchell High School
- Bo Scaife (born and raised in Denver, alumnus of J.K. Mullen High School) – NFL tight end
- Daniel Schlereth (born in Anchorage, Alaska, moved to Highlands Ranch; alumnus of Highlands Ranch High School) – relief pitcher for Detroit Tigers
- Brian Schottenheimer (born in Denver) – offensive coordinator for Indianapolis Colts
- Brian Shaw (born in Fort Lupton) – four-time World's Strongest Man champion; three-time Arnold Strongman Classic champion
- Nick Shore (born in Denver, attended University of Denver) – former center in NHL
- Jaccob Slavin (born in Erie, attended Colorado College) – plays defense in NHL currently with Carolina Hurricanes
- Aaron Smith (born and raised in Colorado Springs; attended Sierra High School and University of Northern Colorado) – defensive end for Pittsburgh Steelers, won two Super Bowls (2005, 2008); selected to NFL Pro Bowl (2004); named to Sports Illustrated's All-Decade Team (2000s)
- Alex Smith (born in The Bahamas, moved to Denver; attended J. K. Mullen High School) – tight end for Cleveland Browns, New England Patriots and Tampa Bay Buccaneers
- Jason Smith (born in Kersey) – basketball player, first-round pick in 2007 NBA draft, power forward for Washington Wizards
- Nate Solder (born in Denver) – offensive tackle for New York Giants, first-round pick in 2011 NFL draft
- Janine Sonis (born in Highlands Ranch) – soccer player, fullback for the Denver Summit, gold medalist with Canada’s women’s national soccer team
- Kory Sperry (born in Pueblo) – tight end for San Diego Chargers
- Mallory Swanson (born in Littleton) – soccer player, forward for the Chicago Red Stars and USWNT, World Cup winner, scored the game winning goal in the gold medal match at the 2024 Summer Olympics
- Maor Tiyouri (born 1990 and lives in Boulder) – Israeli Olympic marathon runner
- Eve Torres (born in Denver) – WWE Divas champion
- Bobby Unser (born in Colorado Springs) – auto racing driver; two-time winner of USAC/CART Indy Car championship (1968 and 1974), three-time winner of Indianapolis 500 (1968, 1975 and 1981); 13-time winner of Open-Wheel Class at Pikes Peak International Hill Climb; inducted in International Motorsports Hall of Fame (1990), Motorsports Hall of Fame of America (1994), and National Sprint Car Hall of Fame (1997)
- Jerry Unser (born in Colorado Springs) – auto racing driver, winner of USAC Stock Car championship (1957)
- Pat Valenzuela (born in Montrose – jockey, winner of Kentucky Derby, Preakness and Breeders' Cup
- Amy Van Dyken (born in Denver, alumnus of Cherry Creek High School) – swimmer, winner of six Olympic gold medals (four in 1996, two in 2000), three FINA World Championship gold medals (1998) and three Pan American Games gold medals (1995)
- Charles Washington (born in Colorado) – NFL player
- LenDale White (born and raised in Denver, alumnus of South High School and Chatfield Senior High School) – All-American running back for USC, running back for three NFL teams
- Sophia Wilson (born in Windsor) – soccer player, forward for Portland Thorns FC and the USWNT, Olympic gold medalist
- Joanna Zeiger – Olympic and world champion triathlete, and author
- Cat Zingano (born in Winona, Minnesota but attended high school in Boulder) – UFC mixed martial artist

== Business and community leaders ==
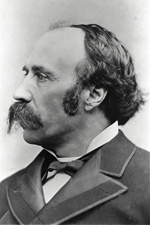
Horace Tabor

- William Bent (lived near present-day La Junta) – with his brothers, Bent established Bent's Fort trading post; became a peace negotiator between settlers and Native Americans
- Norman E. Brinker (born in Denver; died in Colorado Springs) – restaurateur responsible for new business concepts in the restaurant field, such as the salad bar
- Margaret Brown (lived in Colorado) – socialite, philanthropist, and activist who became famous in the 1912 sinking of the RMS Titanic, "The Unsinkable Molly Brown"
- James C. Collins (born in Boulder) – business consultant, author, and lecturer on the subject of company sustainability and growth
- Adolph Coors (lived in Golden) – based in Golden, established what is now the nation's third largest brewing company; his family has been active in Colorado politics and philanthropy
- Charles Gates Jr. (born in Denver) – longtime president of the Gates Corporation, the world's largest maker of automotive belts and hoses
- Elliot Handler (raised in Denver) – co-founder of Mattel; helped develop some of the biggest-selling toys in American history, including Barbie dolls, Chatty Cathy, Creepy Crawlers and Hot Wheels
- Ruth Handler (born in Denver) – businesswoman and inventor; served as the president of the toy manufacturer Mattel and is remembered for her role in designing and marketing the Barbie doll
- Margaret Isely (1921–1997) – peace activist and co-founder of WCPA and Natural Grocers by Vitamin Cottage
- Philip Isely (1915–2012) – peace activist, writer and co-founder of WCPA-GREN and Natural Grocers by Vitamin Cottage
- Daniel M. Lewin (born in Denver) – mathematician and entrepreneur, known for co-founding the internet company, Akamai Technologies; one of the murdered passengers on American Airlines Flight 11
- J. George Leyner (1860–1920) – Mining engineer who invented mining equipment with improved safety and efficiency
- James Smith McDonnell (1899–1980) (born in Denver) – aviation pioneer and founder of McDonnell Aircraft Corporation
- Otto Mears (born in Russia, lived in Silverton) – entrepreneur, financier, and railroad builder; founder of the Rio Grande Southern and the Silverton railroads
- David Halliday Moffat (1839–1911) – banker, financier, industrialist, and inspiration for the Moffat Tunnel, the world's-longest railway tunnel upon its completion
- Texas Jack Omohundro (lived and died in Leadville) – frontier scout, actor, and cowboy
- General William Jackson Palmer (lived in Colorado Springs) – founder of Colorado Springs, developed the first narrow gauge railroad system, the Denver and Rio Grande, owned the Colorado Fuel and Iron Company in Pueblo
- Winfield Scott Stratton (lived in Victor and Colorado Springs) – prospector, businessman and philanthropist; became a millionaire after he discovered and developed the Independence Mine; when he died he left all of his wealth for the construction of the Myron Stratton Home, for homeless and poor people
- Horace Tabor (lived in Leadville) – prospector, businessman, and politician
- Gertrude Vaile (1878–1954) – social worker
- Stanley M. Wagner (1932–2013) – academic and longtime congregational rabbi of Beth HaMedrosh Hagodol-Beth Joseph

== Literary figures ==
- Robert Baer (raised in Aspen) – author and a former CIA case officer assigned to the Middle East; wrote the books See No Evil and Sleeping with the Devil
- Matthew Berry (born in Denver) – creator of the Man's League inductee in the Fantasy Sports Trade Association Hall of Fame, and author (Fantasy Life)
- Eleanor Brown (lives in Highlands Ranch) – author of New York Times bestselling novel The Weird Sisters and The Light of Paris
- Neal Cassady (born in Salt Lake City, Utah, raised in Denver) – figure from the Beat Generation, known for being characterized as Dean Moriarty in Jack Kerouac's novel On the Road
- Clive Cussler (lived in Arvada and Golden) – novelist, Raise the Titanic, Deep Six
- Eugene Field (lived in Denver) – poet and journalist known for his work in children's literature, wrote such poems as "Little Boy Blue" and "Wynken, Blynken, and Nod"
- Allen Ginsberg (lived in Boulder) – Beat Generation poet, author of "Howl" and "Kaddish", co-founder of the Naropa Institute's Jack Kerouac School of Disembodied Poetics in Boulder
- Shelby Holliday (grew up in Denver) – journalist for The Wall Street Journal
- Helen Hunt Jackson (lived in Colorado Springs) – wrote about the relationship between Coloradans and the Native Indian Tribes, and is often remembered for her brave stance in books such as A Century of Dishonor and Ramona
- Ken Kesey (born in La Junta) – author of One Flew Over the Cuckoo's Nest
- Benjamin Kunkel (born 1972) – novelist and political economist
- James A. Michener (attended college in Greeley) – worked as a professor at the University of Northern Colorado in Greeley where his archives are held; his novel Centennial is about Colorado history
- Nellie Burget Miller (lived in Colorado Springs) – Poet Laureate of Colorado; president, Colorado State Federation of Women's Clubs
- Jack Murphy (born in Denver) – sportswriter, football stadium in San Diego was named for him
- Sayyid Qutb – author, poet, educator, and Islamic political theorist who described his stay in Greeley in the censorious article The America that I Have Seen that aroused Anti-American Sentiment among many Muslims; executed by Egypt
- Marguerite Roberts (born in Greeley) – screenwriter, films include Ivanhoe, True Grit, 5 Card Stud
- Harold Ross (born in Aspen) – journalist, founder of The New Yorker
- Lowell Thomas (born in Woodington, Ohio, but raised in Victor) – writer, journalist, broadcaster and traveler best known as the man who made Lawrence of Arabia famous
- Hunter S. Thompson (lived in Woody Creek) – author; creator of Gonzo journalism
- Dalton Trumbo (born in Montrose; lived in Grand Junction; attended the University of Colorado Boulder) – author of Johnny Got His Gun and Oscar-winning screenwriter for his work in The Brave One; wrote the scripts for Spartacus, Exodus, Hawaii, and Papillon; was blacklisted during the 1950s as one of the Hollywood 10
- Connie Willis (lives in Greeley) – science fiction writer

== Military figures ==
- Erwin J. Boydston (enlisted in Colorado) – recipient of the United States Navy Medal of Honor for his service during the Boxer Rebellion
- Arleigh Burke (born in Boulder) – admiral of the United States Navy during World War II along with the Korean War; later the Chief of Naval Operations during the Eisenhower administration
- Louis H. Carpenter – recipient of the United States Army Medal of Honor for meritorious service in Colorado during the Indian Wars
- Christopher Houston "Kit" Carson (1809–1868) – frontiersman, commander of Fort Garland (1866–1867), and negotiator of the 1867 peace treaty between the United States and the Ute tribe
- Francis S. Dodge – recipient of the United States Army Medal of Honor for his service in Colorado during the Indian Wars
- Dwight David Eisenhower (married in Denver) – 34th president of the United States; organized the temporary location of Lowry Air Force Base, Denver, for a new service academy, the United States Air Force Academy; in 1954, Colorado Springs won the location for the new United States Air Force Academy site; as president, his official airplanes, Lockheed Constellation, were The Columbine, Colorado's state flower; was treated for cardiac events several times at Fitzsimmons Army Hospital
- William R. Grove (enlisted in Colorado) – recipient of the United States Army Medal of Honor for his service during the Philippine–American War
- William P. Hall – recipient of the United States Army Medal of Honor for his service in Colorado during the Indian Wars
- Henry Johnson – recipient of the United States Army Medal of Honor for his service as a "Buffalo Soldier" in Colorado during the Indian Wars
- Marc Alan Lee – first Navy SEAL to die in Operation Iraqi Freedom; posthumously awarded the Silver Star, the Bronze Star Medal with Valor and the Purple Heart
- John Merrill – recipient of the United States Army Medal of Honor for gallant service in Colorado during the Indian Wars
- Wilhelm O. Philipsen – recipient of the United States Army Medal of Honor for his service in Colorado during the Indian Wars
- George W. Wallace (enlisted in Colorado) – recipient of the United States Army Medal of Honor for his service during the Philippine–American War

== Musicians ==
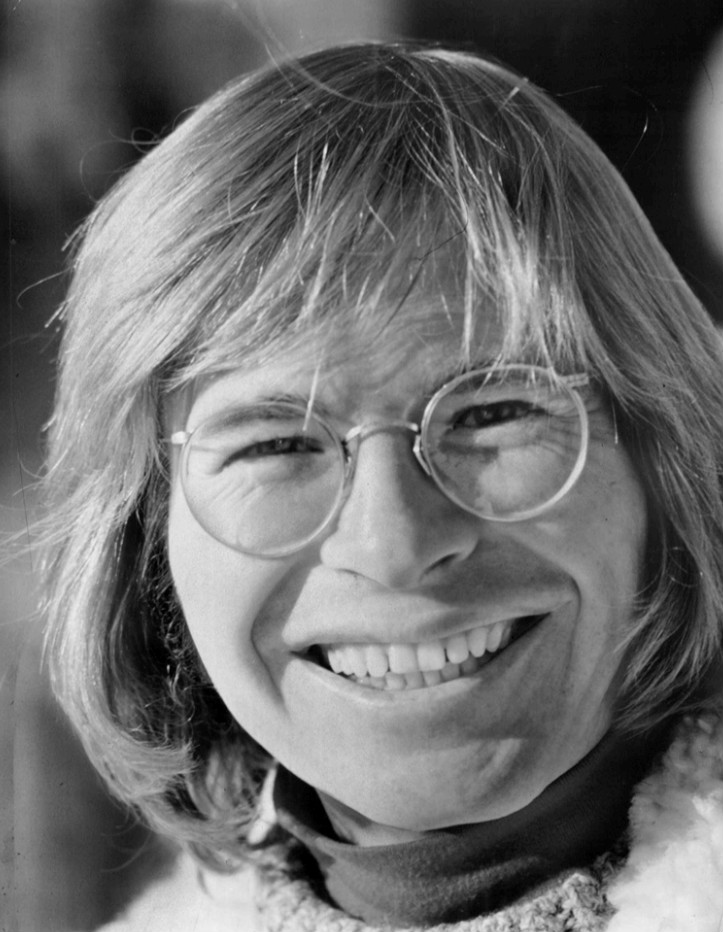
John Denver

- 3OH!3 (formed in Boulder) – electronica group; song "Don't Trust Me" from the album Want certified platinum by the RIAA
- Laurie Anderson (lived in Boulder) – avant garde performer and musician, communications expert, writer
- The Astronauts (formed in Boulder) – surf rock; first album along with the song "Baja" was number sixty-one in May 1963 on the Billboard 200 album chart
- Philip Bailey (attended East High School in Denver) – singer/musician, Earth, Wind and Fire
- Ginger Baker (lived in Parker during the 1990s – English drummer, member of Cream
- Jello Biafra (real name Eric Boucher; born in Boulder; lived in Denver) – singer, songwriter, owner of Alternative Tentacles record label, member of the punk band Dead Kennedys
- Big Head Todd and the Monsters (formed at the University of Colorado Boulder) – rock band; two of the band's albums have reached Billboard's Top 40 Album charts (1993, 1994), with one (Sister Sweetly) certified platinum by the RIAA
- Tommy Bolin (lived in Boulder) – guitarist of Zephyr, James Gang, and Deep Purple
- Breathe Carolina (born and raised in Denver) – electronica/screamo group; band consists of David Schmitt, Tommy Coops, Luis Bonet, Eric Armenta
- Antonia Brico (lived in Denver) – conductor and pianist; was conductor of the Brico Symphony Orchestra and the Denver Symphony Orchestra
- Chris Broderick (lived in Lakewood; attended University of Denver) – lead guitarist for thrash metal band Megadeth
- Jesse Carmichael (born in Boulder) – keyboardist for the rock group Maroon 5
- John Denver (real name Henry Deutschendorf Jr.; lived in Aspen) – singer, guitarist, songwriter; winner of a Grammy Award (1997) and a posthumous Grammy Hall of Fame Award (1998); inducted into the Songwriters Hall of Fame (1996); named the official Poet Laureate of the State of Colorado (1977), with his song "Rocky Mountain High", which was named as one of the state's official songs
- DeVotchKa (formed in Denver) – rock band, nominated for a Grammy Award (2006), assisted in composing and performing the score for the film Little Miss Sunshine
- Larry Dunn (attended East High School in Denver) – musician/keyboards, Earth, Wind and Fire
- Bryan Erickson (lives in Westminster) – singer, producer; member of the bands Velvet Acid Christ and Toxic Coma
- R5
- Flobots (formed in Denver) – Hip hop band known for the song "Handlebars" from their album Fight with Tools; board members on the non-profit organization Flobots.org, a community organization; Flobots.org was founded before the band attained any fame
- The Fluid (formed in Denver) – grunge band
- Dan Fogelberg – folk/soft rock/pop singer, songwriter, multi-instrumentalist; recorded material for some albums at Nederland, Colorado; built a recording studio, Mountain Bird Studio, in the Pagosa Springs area
- Josephine Foster (from Fort Collins) – singer-songwriter
- The Fray (formed in Denver) – rock band; nominated for two Grammy Awards (2007); album How to Save a Life has been certified double platinum by the RIAA; members Dave Welsh and Ben Wysocki attended Ralston Valley High School in Arvada
- Bill Frisell (attended East High School in Denver) – jazz musician/guitarist
- Don Grusin (born 1941 in Denver, lives in Boulder) – songwriter, producer and keyboardist
- India.Arie (born as India Arie Simpson in Denver) – singer, multi-instrumentalist, songwriter, producer; winner of two Grammy Awards (2003, nominated sixteen times); three released albums have all hit Billboard's Top 40 Albums chart and have been certified by the RIAA as either platinum or multi-platinum sellers
- Itchy-O (formed in Denver) – electronica experimental group; approximately 40 band members performing in the audience, with marching-band drums, taiko drums, electronics, dancers, and a Chinese lion; all while masked, covered in LED lights, often with fireworks and other props such as giant puppets and flame throwers
- Ronnie Lane (lived and died in Trinidad) – singer, songwriter, bass guitarist; member of the bands Small Faces and Faces, and founder of his own backing band Slim Chance
- Lecrae (lived in Denver) – Christian hip hop recording artist, songwriter, record producer, and actor; president, co-owner and co-founder of the independent record label Reach Records
- The Lumineers (based in Denver) – folk rock band
- C.W. McCall (lived in Ouray) – country singer known for the song "Convoy" in 1975; served six years as mayor of Ouray in 1986
- Ron Miles (attended East High School in Denver) – musician/trumpet, jazz
- Glenn Miller (full name Alton Glenn Miller; lived in Fort Morgan and Boulder; alumnus of Fort Morgan High School and the University of Colorado Boulder) – trombonist, band leader, leader of the Glenn Miller Orchestra and the United States Army Air Force Band; at the time of his death, one fifth of all music played on jukeboxes was a Glenn Miller creation
- Ronnie Montrose (born in Denver) – rock guitarist who led a number of his own bands as well as performing with a variety of musicians
- Jaye P. Morgan (born in Mancos) – singer and television personality
- OneRepublic (formed in Colorado Springs) – rock band; album Dreaming Out Loud has been certified platinum by the RIAA
- Günther Johannes Paetsch (born in Germany, lived in Colorado Springs) – cellist and co-founder of the Paetsch Family Chamber Music Ensemble in Colorado Springs
- Pretty Lights (from Fort Collins)
- Nathaniel Rateliff (based in Denver) – singer and songwriter
- The Samples (formed in Boulder) – reggae-influenced rock/pop group
- Sugarloaf (formed in Denver) – scored two Top 10 hits, with the singles "Green-Eyed Lady" and "Don't Call Us, We'll Call You"
- Tickle Me Pink (formed in Fort Collins) – signed to Wind-Up Records; debut album Madeline
- Townes Van Zandt (lived in Boulder; briefly attended the University of Colorado) – country singer and songwriter
- Velvet Acid Christ (based in Denver) – electro-industrial band
- Chuck E. Weiss (grew up in Denver) – musician and subject of the 1979 Rickie Lee Jones song "Chuck E.'s in Love"
- Paul Whiteman (born in Denver) – considered by some the "King of Jazz"; after selling two million records with the song "The Japanese Sandman", Whiteman added to his fame by being one of the first nationally broadcast jazz musicians; remembered for his ability to fuse jazz and classical in hits like Rhapsody in Blue and "Whispering"
- Kip Winger (born in Denver) – singer and bassist for the 1980s hair metal band Winger, which had hit songs such as "Seventeen" and "Headed for a Heartbreak"; since band's breakup in 1994, Winger has continued as a solo artist
- Andrew Woolfolk (attended East High School in Denver) – musician/alto saxophone, Earth, Wind and Fire
- Yonder Mountain String Band (based in Nederland) – bluegrass jam band whose fan base has been fueled primarily through live performances since their inception in 1998; self-titled 2006 studio album was the band's first release with a major label
- Ace Young (born and raised in Denver) – American Idol finalist

== Politicians ==
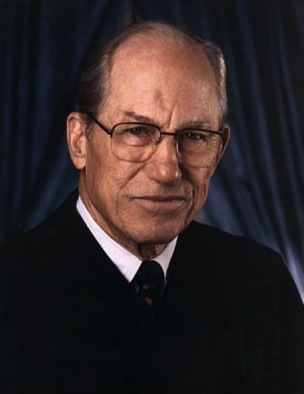
Byron White

- Madeleine Albright (spent her teen years in Denver; graduated from the Kent Denver School in Cherry Hills Village) – U.S. secretary of state during the presidency of Bill Clinton
- Frank Bogert (born in Mesa, Colorado) – rodeo announcer, actor, author, mayor of Palm Springs California, Walk of Stars honoree
- William B. Ebbert (lived in Rocky Ford, Pueblo and Cortez) – served in Colorado General Assembly, 1889–1890 (Republican); 1907–1908 (Democrat); 1911–1912 (Democrat); rancher, farmer, poet and American Civil War veteran
- Gerald Ford (lived in Vail) – 38th president of the United States
- Trent Franks (born in Uravan) – U.S. representative for Arizona's 2nd congressional district
- John Kerry (born in Aurora) – U.S. secretary of state since 2013; longtime U.S. senator from Massachusetts, 1985–2013; ran as the Democratic nominee for U.S. president in 2004
- Golda Meir (spent part of her adolescence in Denver) – fourth prime minister of Israel
- Chief Ouray (lived in Colorado) – Native American leader of the Uncompahgre band of the Ute tribe of southwestern Colorado
- Dana Perino (grew up in Denver, graduate of Colorado State University Pueblo) – White House Press Secretary during the presidency of George W. Bush from September 14, 2007, to January 20, 2009
- Condoleezza Rice (attended St. Mary's Academy in Cherry Hills Village) – U.S. Secretary of State during the presidency of George W. Bush
- Karl Rove (born in Denver) – deputy chief of staff during the presidency of George W. Bush
- Kenneth R. Rutherford – co-founder of the Landmine Survivors Network
- Mohamed Sabry Soliman (born 1979) – Egyptian suspect in the 2025 Boulder fire attack
- Scott Walker (born in Colorado Springs) – governor of Wisconsin
- Byron R. White (born in Fort Collins; raised in Wellington); graduate of the University of Colorado Boulder) – appointed by U.S. President John F. Kennedy as a Justice of the U.S. Supreme Court; served from 1962 until retiring to senior status in 1993; also notable as a football player, both in college at the University of Colorado Boulder (with the Colorado Buffaloes) and professionally in the National Football League (with the Pittsburgh Pirates and Detroit Lions)
- Chris Wright – U.S. Secretary of Energy during the second presidency of Donald Trump

== Science, technology, engineering, and mathematics ==
- Maurice L. Albertson (1918–2009) – civil engineer and educator
- Sidney Altman (1939–2022) – molecular biologist; 1989 Nobel laureate in Chemistry for the discovery of catalytic properties of ribonucleic acid (RNA)
- Albert Allen Bartlett (1923–2013) – physicist; opponent of the concept of sustainable growth
- Arden L. Bement Jr. (born 1932) – metallurgical engineer, scientist; director of the National Institute of Standards and Technology
- Lewis M. Branscomb (born 1926) – physicist; director of the National Bureau of Standards, founder of the Joint Institute for Laboratory Astrophysics (now known as JILA)
- Mary Babnik Brown (1907–1991) – her hair was used for the Norden bombsight crosshairs
- Louis George Carpenter – founder of the first Bachelor of Science degree in Irrigation Engineering in the Americas
- Thomas Robert Čech (born 1947) – biochemist; 1989 Nobel laureate in Chemistry for the discovery of catalytic properties of ribonucleic acid (RNA)
- Edward Uhler Condon (1902–1974) – nuclear physicist; director of the National Bureau of Standards; president of the American Physical Society
- Eric Allin Cornell (born 1961) – physicist; 2001 Nobel laureate in Physics for creating the first Bose–Einstein condensate in 1995
- Mary Ellen Cusack (1833–1900) – Australian-born botanist and entomologist who lived and collected in Westcliffe, Custer County
- T. Neil Davis (1932–2016) – professor emeritus of geophysics from the University of Alaska Fairbanks; author of several books
- George Gamow (born Georgiy Antonovich Gamov (Георгий Антонович Гамов)) (1904–1968) – theoretical physicist, cosmologist, and author
- John Lewis "Jan" Hall (born 1934) – physicist; 2005 Nobel laureate in Physics for precision spectroscopy and the optical frequency comb technique
- Deborah S. Jin (born 1968) – physicist; created the first fermionic condensate in 2003
- Herbert Kroemer (1928–2024) – physicist and electrical engineer; 2000 Nobel laureate in Physics for developing semiconductor heterostructures used in high-speed- and opto-electronics
- Matthew Meselson (born 1930) – geneticist and molecular biologist
- Margaret Mary Murnane (born 1959) – physicist and creator of ultra-high-speed lasers
- Frank Friedman Oppenheimer (1912–1985) – nuclear physicist and educator
- Tim Samaras (1957–2013) – engineer and storm chaser; starred on the Discovery Channel's documentary reality television series Storm Chasers; he died in Oklahoma City's EF3 wedge tornado on May 31, 2013, with his twenty-four-year-old son, Paul, and forty-five-year-old TWISTEX colleague Carl Young of South Lake Tahoe, California
- Nikola Tesla (Никола Тесла) (1856–1943) – inventor and engineer; ran a laboratory in Colorado Springs between 1899 and 1900 to conduct high-voltage, high-frequency experiments
- Carl Edwin Wieman (born 1951) – physicist; 2001 Nobel laureate in Physics for creating the first Bose–Einstein condensate in 1995

== Other notable people ==
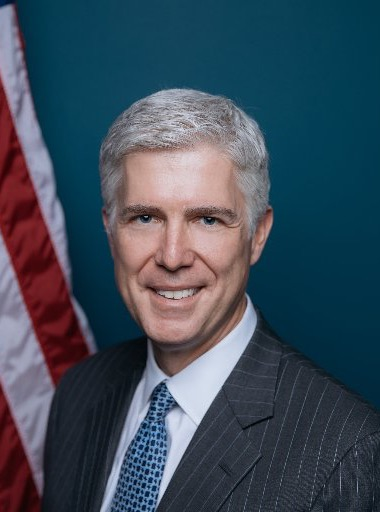
Justice Neil Gorsuch

- Gavin Arthur (1901–1972) – astrologer, sexologist, grandson of President Chester A. Arthur
- Cassie Bernall (1981-1999) - murder victim, she was shot by two perpetrators while attending colombine high school
- Emily Gibson Braerton (1884–1966) (lived in Denver) – historian; vice president general of the Daughters of the American Revolution (1950–1953)
- John Brown (1817–1889) – mountain man and trader in and around Pueblo 1841–1849
- Katherine M. Cook (1876–1962) – Colorado state superintendent of public instruction
- Colorow
- Mamie Geneva Doud Eisenhower (lived in Denver) – married West Point graduate and future U.S. President Dwight David Eisenhower in 1916 in her Lafayette Street home; was a military wife before becoming the First Lady of the United States (1953–1961)
- Austin Eubanks (1981-2019) - motivational speaker
- Neil Gorsuch (born 1967) – associate justice of the Supreme Court of the United States
- Lars Grimsrud (born 1956) – aerospace engineer and performance automobile enthusiast
- Samuel Hartsel (1834–1918) – pioneer rancher in Park County; founder and namesake of Hartsel
- Marvin Heemeyer (1951–2004) – automobile muffler-repair shop owner killed in his rampage in Granby
- Anne Marie Hochhalter (1981-2025) - Anti-gun violence activist
- Sheldon Jackson (1834–1909) – Presbyterian missionary in Denver and Fairplay and later Alaska
- Dylan Klebold (1981–1999) – one of the Columbine High School Massacre perpetrators
- Chief Niwot – Arapho leader
- Ouray – Native American leader
- Talcott Parsons (1902–1979) – sociologist who founded the concept of action theory
- Grace Espy Patton (1896–1904) – Colorado state superintendent of schools
- Elizabeth Prann (born 1985) – reporter, anchor (Fox News)
- Renee Rabinowitz (1934–2020) – psychologist and lawyer
- Joy-Ann Reid (born 1970) – national correspondent (MSNBC)
- Rick Reilly (born 1958) – sportswriter, author, screenwriter (Leatherheads) and commentator (ESPN)
- Teresita Sandoval (1811–1894) – one of the earliest residents of the settlement which became the city of Pueblo
- Jon Scott (born 1958) – news anchor (Fox News)
- Rachel Scott (1981-1999) - murder victim, she was shot and killed on columbine high school campus by two perpetrators
- John Stone (1949-2022) – Sheriff of Jefferson County at the time of the Columbine High School massacre
- James Q. Wilson (1931–2012) – academic, political scientist, and an authority on public administration
- Jessie Young (1900–1987) – radio commentator, author, magazine publisher

== United States Penitentiary, Administrative Maximum Facility ==
- See Notable current inmates of ADX Florence and Notable former inmates of ADX Florence

== See also ==
- Bibliography of Colorado
- Geography of Colorado
- History of Colorado
- Index of Colorado-related articles
- List of Colorado suffragists
- List of Colorado-related lists
- Outline of Colorado
