= Colorado Man =

Colorado Man may refer to:

- The Man from Colorado, 1948 American Western film
- List of people from Colorado
