= Jacque Georgia =

American writer, actress, model and motivational speaker (born 1978)

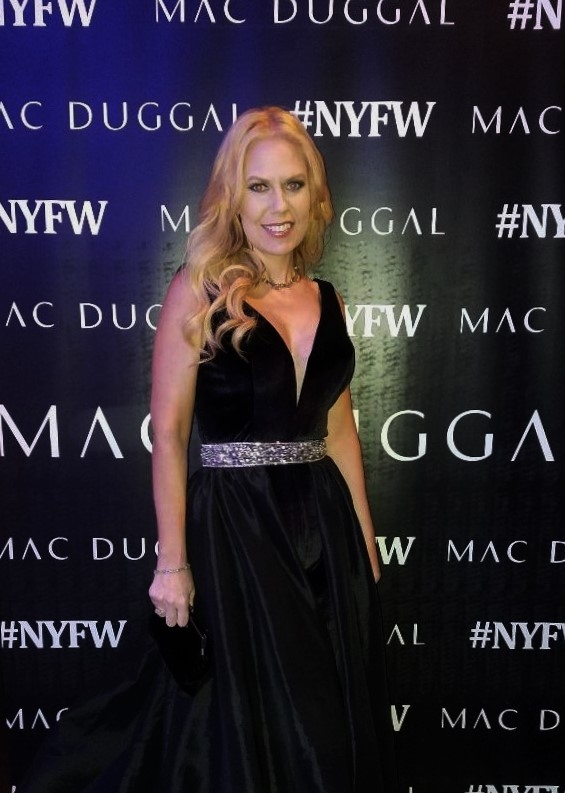
- Georgia in 2018
- Born: Jacqueline Jo Wanek; May 31, 1978 (age 48); Wisconsin, US
- Occupations: Writer, actress, model, and motivational speaker

Jacque Georgia (born Jacqueline Jo Wanek; May 31, 1978) is an American writer, actress, model, and motivational speaker.

== Early life ==
Georgia was born on May 31, 1978, to JoAnn and Larry Wanek, was raised in Brown County, Wisconsin.

== Career ==
Prior to her stroke at the end of 2014, she owned and operated multiple businesses, including Pioneer Credit Union, where she started her finance career as a branch manager. (Pioneer later merged with Capital Credit Union.)

She continued her career in finance, including becoming a partner in her own mortgage company in 2006 during the housing crisis. She was a columnist for general business topics for a division of the USA Today Network from 2006 to 2011. Her focus was on real estate and lending during the Great Recession. She later started her consulting business, TITANIUM Business Development, Inc. and public speaking career.

Georgia travelled the world, working with professionals about their unconscious minds, building self-confidence, and reducing anxiety. She was for a short while a member of Platinum Partners with Tony Robbins, the international business coach known for having his seminar attendees walk across fire.

When interviewed about her stroke, Georgia credited her own lessons about how to utilize the strength of the unconscious mind to the unprecedented swift progress she made during the first 24 hours in the hospital.

Georgia's daughter, Brittany, grew up learning about civic service and philanthropy from her mom, carrying that belief into her own career of pageantry with her mother behind the scenes until 2011, when Brittany encouraged her mother to give it a try.

Jacque Georgia entered the State pageant for the Mrs. International pageant system and won her state's representation. She went on to the international pageant in the summer of 2011, where she spoke about her platform and life belief of "volunteerism". Georgia continued to discuss in interviews that her philosophies were the same for both her personal and professional life: to inspire others and to help others by making a difference in the world.

After her stroke at the end of 2014, Georgia decided to go on a joint venture with her daughter to compete in the Miss United States pageant. In their interview after both winning the state pageant in their respective age divisions, they discussed their obstacles, including Georgia wanting to compete again despite her ongoing medical issues for her own self-confidence.

Their State Director for the Miss United States Organization shared the organization's excitement about having a mother-daughter duo for the first time in over 50 years to be competing for their national titles at the same time: Jacque as Ms. Wisconsin United States 2015 and Brittany as Miss Wisconsin Jr Teen United States 2015.

Georgia returned to the United States Pageant Organization to continue to promote her philanthropy work as a public figure as Mrs. Colorado United States 2019. The national competition was held in Las Vegas, Nevada during the summer of 2019.

After her stroke at the end of 2014, Georgia decided to collect hundreds of inspirational quotes she had written over the years and publish them in her first book: Live. Breathe. Do. - Inspiration Starts Here, which aims to help others lead their lives in a positive and inspirational way. She is currently writing a new book based on her former consulting work, called CONFIDENCE. ACTIONS. RESULTS. - Building Self-Confidence with the Synergistic Power of Color, Language, and Physiology. It was expected to be released in 2019.

Georgia has modeled in print and on the runway for international gown designers and is currently working to grow her acting portfolio.

Growing up in Green Bay, Wisconsin, she played herself in her first film cameo, in which she talked about her love of her home football team. The 2017 movie, The 60 Yard Line, is a romantic sports comedy.

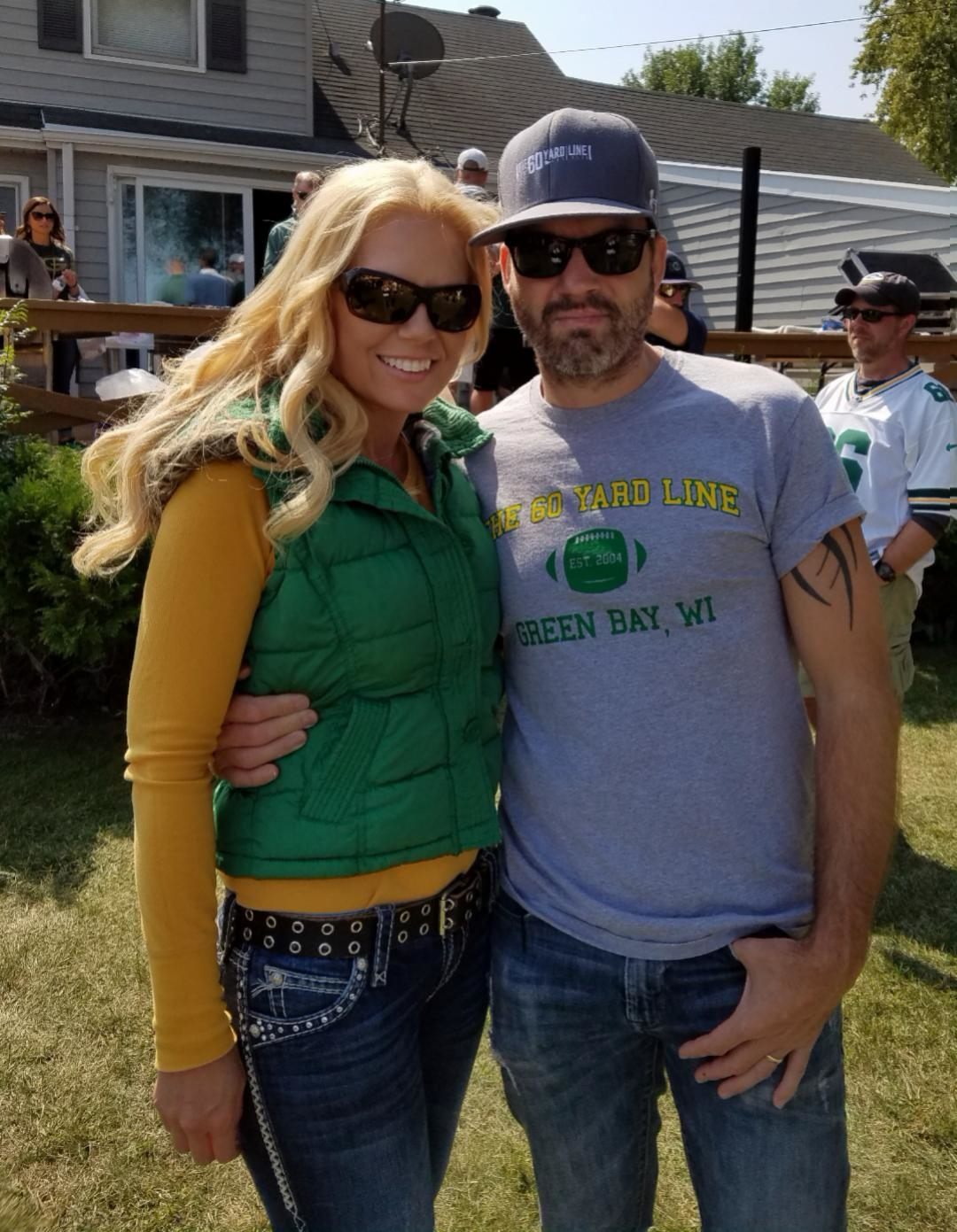
Georgia with actor and director Leif Gantvoort at the Green Bay premiere of the movie The 60 Yard Line

== Personal life ==
Despite the continual medical challenges from Georgia's stroke, she has been able to keep the connections she has had for many years.

Georgia now resides in Colorado with her husband, Brad Georgia. They have one daughter and two sons.

Georgia continues her advocacy and philanthropy.
