= The Quin =

Hotel in Manhattan, New York

The Quin Hotel
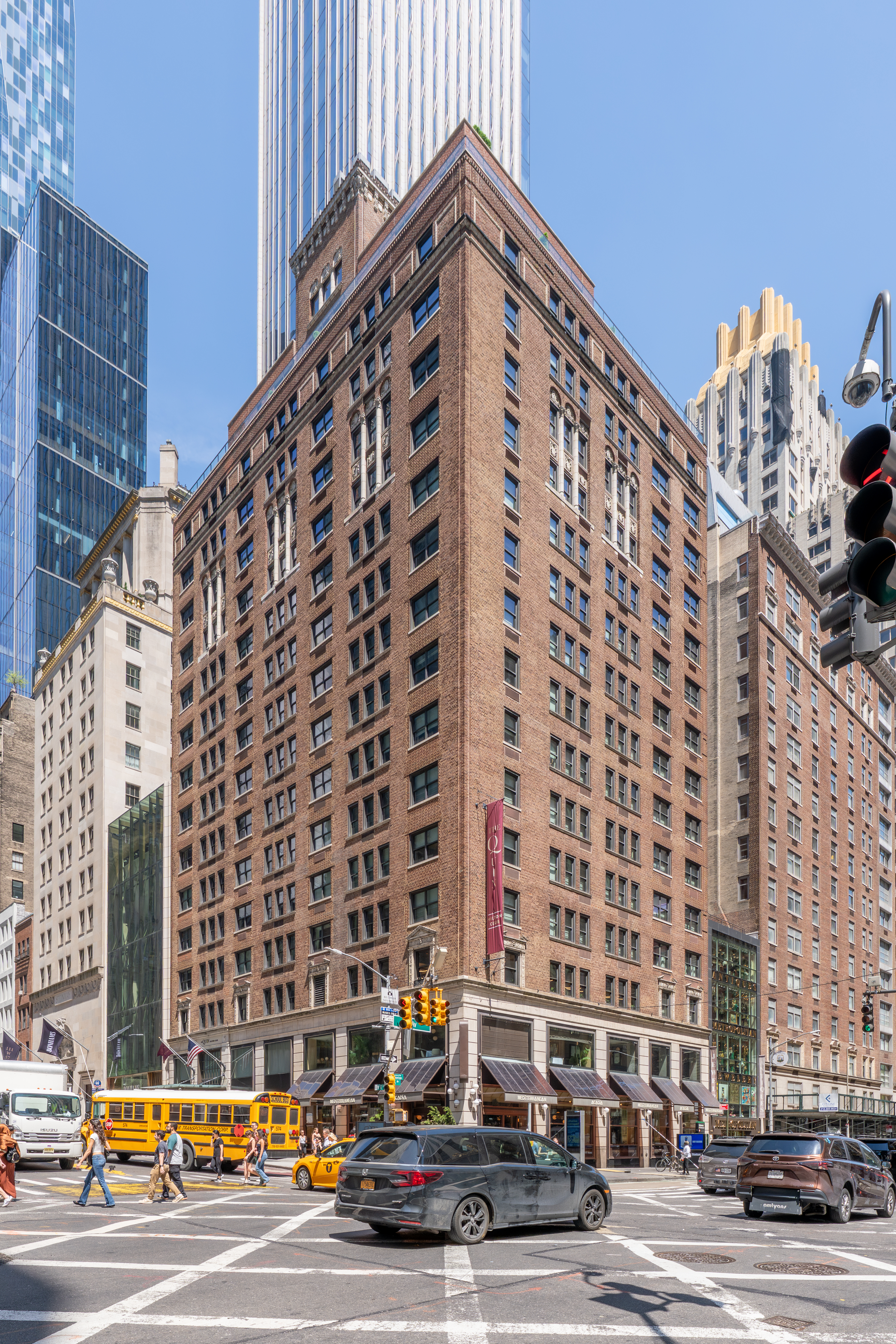
- Exterior of the Quin (2026)

General information
- Location: 101 West 57th Street, Manhattan, New York, United States
- Coordinates: 40.7644°N 73.9777°W
- Opening: November 11, 2013
- Affiliation: Small Luxury Hotels of the World

Technical details
- Floor count: 17

Design and construction
- Architect: Emery Roth

Renovating team
- Architect: Perkins Eastman

Other information
- Number of rooms: 208
- Number of suites: 28
- Number of restaurants: 1

Website
- thequinhotel.com

The Quin is a luxury hotel in New York City. It is located on 57th Street and Sixth Avenue in Midtown Manhattan, two blocks south of Central Park.

The Quin was originally the Buckingham Hotel, a Beaux-Arts style building designed by American architect Emery Roth, which opened in 1929. The Quin reopened on November 11, 2013, following a redesign by New York City based firm Perkins Eastman. It has 208 guestrooms including 28 suites.

== Notable residents ==
Former guests include Georgia O'Keeffe, Ignacy Jan Paderewski, and Marc Chagall.

== Quin Arts ==
The Quin Arts program presents events, exhibitions, salons, lectures, film premieres, book debuts, musical performances and artist receptions.

=== Artist-in-residence program ===
The Quin Arts Program also features a contemporary artist-in-residence program under the direction of curator DK Johnston. Under the program, artists stay and work at the hotel, enabling guests to interact with them and gain insight that goes beyond what a visit to museum or gallery can impart. The program has mostly included street artists who have drawn and painted on hotel doors, stairwells, and other areas, in addition to exhibiting work in the lobby. Blek le Rat, who was in residence in 2014, was mistakenly nearly arrested after police saw him stenciling on a hotel door. The summer 2016 artist in residence was Berlin-based street artist Tavar Zawacki aka Above (artist). In September 2016, the Quin commissioned Chaz Barrisson, half of the street art duo London Police, to paint two of his signature grinning characters on the wall by the service doors of the hotel. The London Police residency included a gallery show of their graphic, black-and-white work, done on canvas and paper. Johnston reports that guests have started to plan trips around artists' residencies.

=== Recognition and awards ===
In June 2014, the Quin hotel was shortlisted for the "Most Creative Collaboration" Award at LE Miami travel trade show for its arts program.

=== Group exhibitions and collaborations ===
In November 2016, the Quin commissioned 14 acclaimed artists to create custom pieces for a group salon in partnership with D'Angelico Guitars. Artists included Above (Tavar Zawacki), Alex Yanes, ASVP, Blek le Rat, Eric Zener, Joanne CORNO, Amanda Marie, Mindy Linkous, Nick Walker, Pure Evil, Robert Malmberg, SP38, The London Police, and Wulf Treu.

=== Featured solo exhibitions ===
Robert Malmberg contributed to the program again in February 2017 with a second solo Quin Arts exhibition entitled, Light Waves. Light Waves highlights two diverse expressions of Malmberg's work and features a color saturated Neon Landscapes series, along with a black and white presentation of oversized contact sheets exploring Manhattan. Malmberg is a photographer and filmmaker from Louisville, Kentucky. A pioneer in the revival of wet collodion photography, Malmberg capitalizes on wet-plate, slow exposure techniques to produce ultra-detailed and hauntingly nostalgic images. The meticulous process riffs off the imperfection and beauty of 19th century portrait photography. In August 2014, Malmberg was commissioned by the New York Historical Society Museum & Library to reimagine Antebellum era photography with "Camp History: Civil War Photography," a workshop for NYC youth. His inaugural exhibition at the Quin, INcognito, debuted March 5, 2015.

Dutch photographer Anne Barlinckhoff's solo exhibition Strength Africa debuted at the Quin in the spring of 2017 and featured works captured during her travels through West Africa. Barlinckhoff's inspiration was driven "by love, life and loss and all those moments in between." Portraits embodied the strength and vulnerability of her female subjects amid Africa's vibrant landscape.

In June 2017, American photojournalist Hilary Swift presented her first solo exhibition Time In-Between—a collection of intimate and surprising portraits documenting everyday life in New York City. Swift covers politics, social issues, and breaking news, and is a frequent contributor to The New York Times.

The Quin then showcased two exhibitions by Danish photographer Søren Solkær. SURFACE—the first collection of its kind to be exhibited within a luxury suite—captured some of the world's most famous street artists at work over a three-year journey around the globe and was installed in the Quin Penthouse. These portraits were taken from his fine art photography book of the same name, first published in 2015. A reissue featuring new photography is slated for early 2018. HEART BEAT CITY consisted of select photographs from SURFACE and new New York-centric images commissioned for the Quin. It debuted in the hotel's lobby August 17, 2017.

In October 2017, the Quin showcased works from photographer Andy Freeberg's published series: Sentry, Guardians, and Art Fare. In this collection, Freeberg, who is perhaps best known for his portraits, captures life inside a museum. Freeberg turns his lens to the dealers, artists, art enthusiasts, and museum guards in galleries to explore their interplay with the works of art themselves. The prolific artist has been featured in public and private museum collections, international solo shows from California to Russia to Mexico City, and publications including Rolling Stone, Le Monde, The Guardian, and The New Yorker.

The Quin's year-long photography series culminated with photographer Bo Bridges's exhibition Fear the Life Unlived in November 2017. This adrenaline-boosting collection captured Bridges's intrepid spirit, showcasing his adventures chasing the surf and the highest altitudes in Tahiti, Hawaii, Mexico's Guadalupe Islands, the Grand Tetons, and Southern California. As an acclaimed commercial and versatile fine arts photographer, his portfolio includes portraits of celebrities and athletes, film and television campaigns, as well as nature, sports, and travel photography. Through stunning imagery, Fear the Life Unlived demonstrated what "the pursuit of the rush" looks like.

On April 12, 2018, DK Johnston and Getty Image Gallery celebrated late photographer Slim Aarons. Over 20 works from the Getty Image archive were on display at Quin's triplex Penthouse Suite and selected public spaces through the close of 2018. A decorated soldier turned high-flying photographer, Aarons left US Army's Yank Magazine to shoot for Life in Rome. He traded war for the "sun-dazed glamour and frivolity" of jet-setters and celebrities and photographed the "stunning palazzos, private villas and wealthy estates" of the dolce vita lifestyle. In his time, he worked for a myriad of fashion and leisure publications including Holiday, Town and Country, Vanity Fair, Vogue, Harper's Bazaar, Travel & Leisure and Life. Aarons captured the "cult of the celebrity" with a roster of star subjects, including Truman Capote, Marilyn Monroe, Louis Armstrong, and President Kennedy. Aarons "lived by a simple mantra: concentrate on photographing attractive people doing attractive things in attractive places."

=== Thematic exhibitions ===
The Quin featured an exhibition from seven New York Academy of Art alumni, co-curated by Heidi Elbers and DK Johnston in spring 2018. Selections from esteemed graduates Tamalin Baumgarten, Shauna Finn, Alexis Hilliard, Gianna Putrino, James Razko, Nicolas V. Sanchez, and Gabriel Zea were on view in the Quin lobby. From printmaking to complex collages, the breadth of the exhibition displayed the artists' collection of distinct styles and influences that parallel the multiplicity of New York City. Together, these artists brought an "impressive range of techniques, viewpoints, and experiences" that allowed the alumni to not only to interact with visitors and the local community, but to showcase the talents of the Academy. The Quin and the New York Academy of Art have an extended history of collaboration, most notably, "Blek le Rat: Escaping Paris." This series included 25 unique monotypes with lithography created by Blek le Rat at the Academy and was presented at the Quin in 2014.

On May 10, 2018, the Quin debuted a vibrant collection of floral-themed pieces to celebrate spring in the city. Co-curated by DK Johnston and New York-based curator Lori Zimmer, In BLOOM highlighted the signature styles of 29 participating artists. Artists included Alexis Hilliard, Annika Connor, ASVP, Beau Stanton, C215, CRASH (John Matos), Elizabeth Winnel, Ellannah Sadkin, Erik Foss, Galo, Icy & Sot, Jamie Martinez, Jeremy John Kaplan, Joanne Leah, Jon Burgerman, Kathryn Rose, Keya Tama, Logan Hicks, Mando Marie, Michael DeFeo, Mindy Linkous, Nick Walker, Pure Evil (Charley Uzzell Edwards), Robert Malmberg, Ron English, Sean Augustine March, Vahge, and Wulf Von Treu. The lobby's 15 foot video wall showcased Brooklyn-based artist Ashley G. Garner's Synaesthesia series, which featured six films on loop and six separate hues influenced by color psychology. The six-part video series was paired with audio compositions by musician ALURIA.

The Quin's latest exhibition, And Suddenly the Picture was Distorted launched July 12, 2018. Inspired by a lyric from "The Hall of Mirrors" by legendary German electronic group Kraftwerk, this exciting exhibit explored the themes of image, obsession, and perception through a variety of mediums and techniques. Co-curated by DK Johnston and Angelo Madgridale in partnership with Doyle, selections included private collections and new work from Swoon, ROA, WK Interact, Nick Walker, John Fekner, Michael De Feo, and Blek le Rat. A special installation on the 15-foot video wall featured the photography of Soren Solkaer. The exhibition also included site-specific work created at the Quin itself, such as a steel door tagged as "Andy Warhol" by renowned graffiti artist and former Artist in Residence Blek le Rat. As the Quin Arts Program approached its 5th anniversary, And Suddenly the Picture was Distorted celebrated its run of thought-provoking and visually compelling exhibitions, ranging from international graffiti art, to photography, photo-realism, and collage.
