= Eric Zener =

American photorealist artist (born 1966)

- Born: 1966 (age 59–60); Astoria, Oregon, U.S.
- Education: University of California, Santa Barbara
- Known for: Painting
- Movement: Photorealism

Eric Zener (born 1966, Astoria, Oregon) is an American photorealist artist best known for figure paintings of lone subjects, often in or about swimming pools.

== Biography ==
Zener was born in 1966 in Astoria, Oregon, to a psychologist father and a violinist mother who played for the San Francisco Symphony. He grew up in the seaside community of Encinitas, California. In 1991 he settled in San Francisco, where he was still living as of 2004.

Zener has three children, the first born in approximately 1998, the second in approximately 2002, and the 3rd in 2009. He paints mostly out of a studio in Sausalito.

== Career ==
Zener's works have been exhibited and sold throughout the United States, and internationally, and are part of a number of prominent private and corporate art collections.

In April 2014, Zener became the second artist-in-residence of the Quin Arts Program at the Quin Hotel in New York City. His collection at the Quin included a large format oil painting and 11 resins of his most iconic pieces as well as new work from his annual solo show at Gallery Henoch in Chelsea for the Quin's video art wall.

== Painting style and influences ==
Zener is a self-taught artist. As of 2004 he had created more than 600 works. His paintings, mostly in oil, are in a photorealist or "super-realist" style Zener describes as "Contemporary Renaissance".

=== Water paintings ===
In 2003, while living in the Costa Brava region of Spain, Zener became interested in watching bathers, and began a series of paintings of water, and of people interacting with water. Many paintings from this period depict women swimming underwater amidst air bubbles, or diving into the water, and have been described as reminiscent of Hudson River School and Barbizon School painters.

For a second, more "experimental" series of water images, Zener painted over photographic transparencies that had been mounted on a wooden box covered with silver leaf, then covered with resin. Other subjects for Zener have included beach scenes, and businessmen in various unexpected settings, such as by swimming pools or on tightropes.
