= Vitamin Cottage Natural Grocers =

Colorado-based natural foods grocery chain

Natural Grocers by Vitamin Cottage

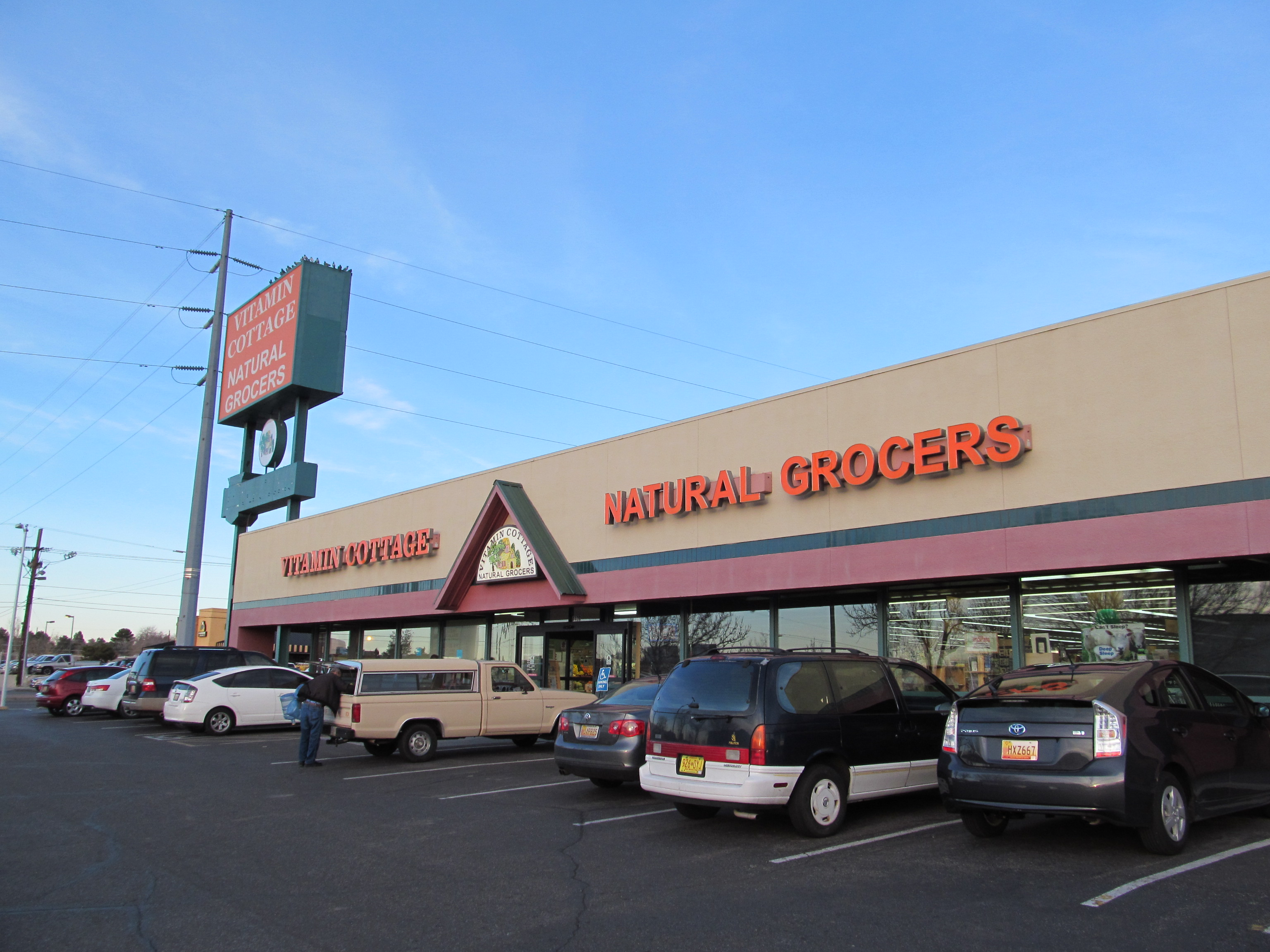
- Vitamin Cottage on Wyoming Blvd in Albuquerque, New Mexico
- Formerly: Vitamin Cottage Natural Grocers
- Type: Public
- Traded as: NYSE: NGVC; Russell 2000 Index component
- Industry: Grocery store; Health food store
- Founded: 1955; 71 years ago
- Founders: Margaret Isely; Philip Isely
- Headquarters: Lakewood, Colorado, U.S.
- Areas served: United States
- Revenue: ▲US$1.33 billion (2025)
- Net income: ▲US$46.4 million (2025)
- Website: naturalgrocers.com

Natural Grocers by Vitamin Cottage, Inc. (formally called Vitamin Cottage Natural Food Markets and commonly referred to as Vitamin Cottage or Natural Grocers) is a Colorado-based health food chain.

The business was founded in 1955 as a door-to-door sales operation by Margaret and Philip Isely. They opened the first Vitamin Cottage store in Lakewood, Colorado, in 1963. After Margaret Isely's death in 1997, the Iselys' children took over the business the following year. Beginning in 2008, the company name was phased to Natural Grocers by Vitamin Cottage to emphasize that groceries, rather than nutritional supplements, formed a majority of its sales. The company made its initial public offering on the New York Stock Exchange in July 2012, raising $107 million.

The store's products include vitamins, dietary supplements, natural and organic food, organic produce and natural body care products. The company has a manifesto entitled "What We Won't Sell and Why"; among the listed items are artificial colors and flavors, artificial preservatives, irradiated food, and meat raised using artificial hormones and antibiotics.

In 2018, the company operated around 162 retail grocery stores in around 20 states, mainly west of the Mississippi River (except California), and had approximately 3,000 employees.

== History ==
In 1955, Margaret and Philip Isely founded a door-to-door sales operation called the Builder's Foundation. The first store opened in 1958 in Denver, Colorado. The inspiration for the business came after the birth of their second child. Margaret became ill and found "conventional medicine" to be unhelpful to her. She treated herself using principles in Adelle Davis's controversial book Let's Get Well.

In the 1960s, the Iselys converted a cottage-style house into a store, inspiring the name Vitamin Cottage. The store opened in Lakewood, Colorado, in 1963. In 1974, the second Vitamin Cottage location opened in Denver.

Natural Grocers founded a cycling team in 1987.

In 1995, the company name was briefly changed to Vitamin Cottage Natural Food Emporium.

Margaret Isely died in 1997, and the Iselys' children took over the business the following year.

In the 2010s, Natural Grocers stopped selling what they call "confinement dairy products", which includes milk from cows that aren't allowed to graze.

In 2026, the company opened its first location in Wisconsin.
