= Steamboat Mountain School =

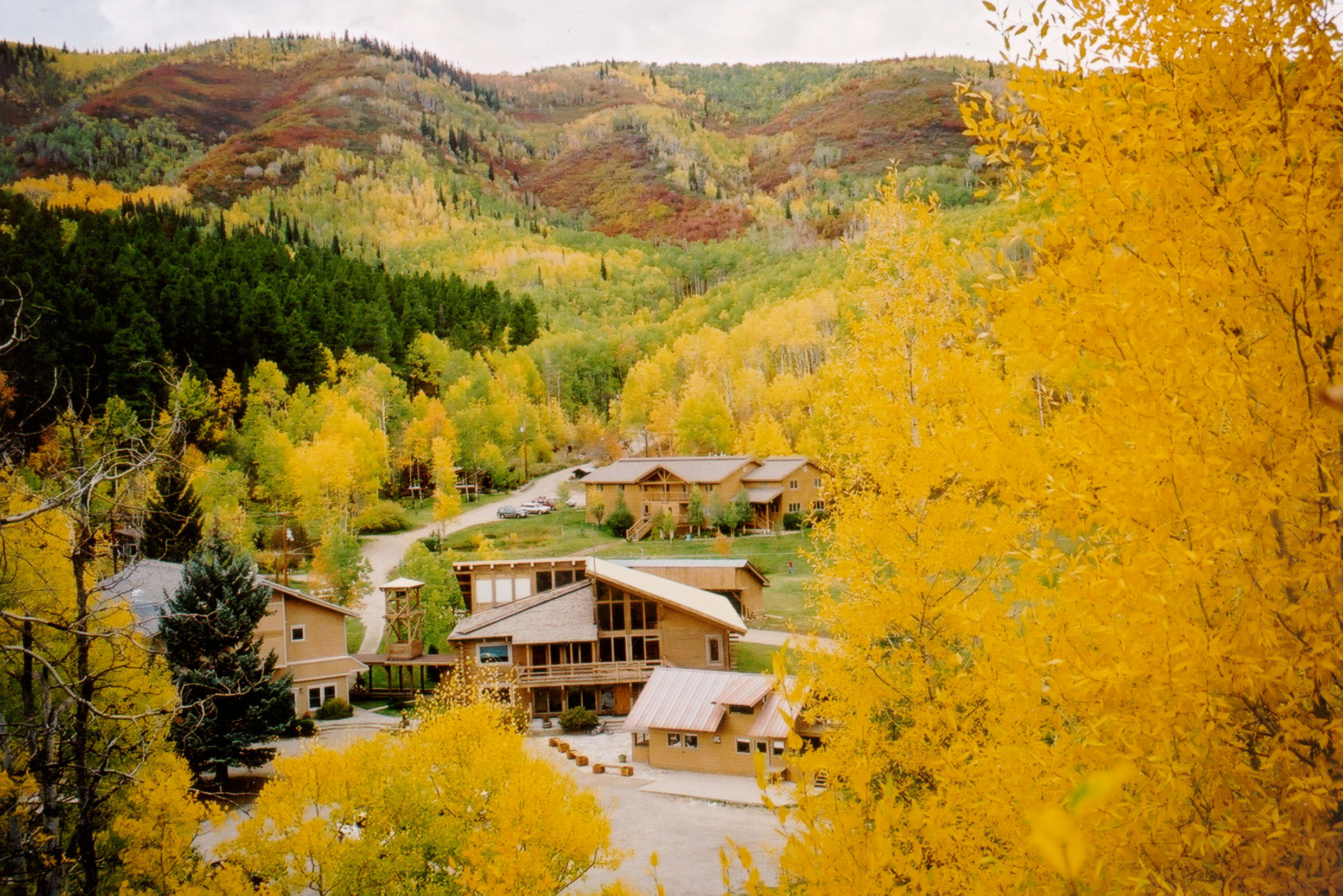
- Campus in the autumn

Location
- 42605 County Road 36; Steamboat Springs, Colorado 80487; United States
- Coordinates: 40°32′13″N 106°49′30″W

Information
- Type: Private, co-ed
- Established: 1957 (69 years ago)
- CEEB code: 061312
- Head of school: Samantha Coyne Donnel
- Faculty: ~50
- Grades: K–12
- Average class size: 16 students
- Student to teacher ratio: 46% boarding to 54% day
- Campus size: 150 acres (0.61 km^{2})
- Colors: orange, navy
- Athletics: Skiing/Snowboarding/Outdoor
- Mascot: Penguin
- Accreditation: ACIS (Association of Colorado Independent Schools)
- Affiliation: NAIS (National Association of Independent Schools) TABS (The Association for Boarding Schools)
- Website: www.steamboatmountainschool.org

Steamboat Mountain School, formerly The Lowell Whiteman School, is a small, college preparatory school in Steamboat Springs, Colorado, focused on experiential education, for students in grades K–12.

The school is a coeducational boarding and day school educating roughly 157 students in grades K through 12. It was founded in 1957 and the curriculum emphasizes college preparatory academics, educational experience in the wilderness, global travel, and both recreational and competitive skiing/snowboarding programs.

== History ==
Steamboat Mountain School was founded in 1957 as a boarding and day high school. It was originally named Lowell Whiteman School after its founder, a local entrepreneur and adventurer, but was renamed in 2014 to emphasize its mountain ethic.

Lowell Whiteman Primary School, with the same namesake, was founded in 1993, and was renamed Emerald Mountain School in 2014. The primary school was modeled after Lowell Whiteman School but was a separate entity. The two schools announced a merger in 2020. The merger took place on 1 January 2021; however, the school continues to operate the two campuses.

== Notable alumni ==
- Caroline Lalive (born 1979), alpine skier and two-time Olympian
- Travis Mayer (born 1982), freestyle skier (moguls) and Olympic silver medalist
- Ryan Max Riley (born 1979), freestyle skier and humorist
- Dylan Roberts, attorney and member of the Colorado House of Representatives
- Johnny Spillane (born 1980), Nordic combined skier, three-time Olympic silver medalist and a World champion
- Bill Browder (born 1964), British financier. CEO and co-founder of Hermitage Capital Management
- John Milius (born 1944) screenwriter, director, and producer
- Hig Roberts, two giant slalom national titles competing on the U.S. Ski Team.
