= Ryan Max Riley =

American freeskier and humor writer (born 1979)

Personal information
- Full name: Ryan Max Riley
- Born: May 15, 1979 (age 47)
- Education: Harvard University, University of Oxford, Yale University
- Occupation: athlete

Sport
- Country: United States
- Sport: Freestyle Skiing
Medal record
Men's Freestyle Skiing
Representing the United States
World Cup
Silver medal – second place	2002 Madarao Japan	Dual Moguls
Goodwill Games
Silver medal – second place	2000 Lake Placid New York	Dual Moguls
Bronze medal – third place	2000 Lake Placid New York	Moguls
US Championships
Silver medal – second place	2004 Heavenly Mountain Resort California	Moguls
Gold medal – first place	2001 Waterville Valley New Hampshire	Moguls
Bronze medal – third place	2000 Sunday River Maine	Moguls
Gold medal – first place	1999 Deer Valley Utah	Dual Moguls
Junior World Championships
Silver medal – second place	1999 Jyvaskyla Finland	Moguls

Ryan Max Riley (born May 15, 1979) is an American athlete who was a two-time US National Champion on the U.S. Ski Team in the freestyle skiing events of moguls and dual moguls.

== United States Ski Team ==
External videos
- Ryan Max Riley winning bronze at Goodwill Games in freestyle skiing moguls in 2000

Riley earned a spot on the U.S. Ski Team in 1998, when he won the overall Nor-Am Cup in Moguls. On March 14, 1998, he competed in his first World Cup, in Altenmarkt-Zauchensee, Austria, and placed 14th. He got his first top-5 result on the World Cup the next season, finishing fifth in Dual Moguls in Madarao, Japan, on February 21, 1999 (he placed sixth the day before in Moguls). A week later, he won the silver medal at the Junior World Championships in Jyvaskyla, Finland.

Riley placed second in a World Cup in 2002 in Madarao, Japan, and won silver and bronze medals at the Goodwill Games in 2000.

He is a 2-time U.S. National Champion in moguls. He won his second U.S. National Championship with one of the highest scores in the history of the sport (a 28.55) in Moguls in 2001 in Waterville Valley, New Hampshire.

In 2000, he was featured in the Warren Miller film Ride.

== Biography ==
Riley grew up in Colorado, graduating in 1997 from the Lowell Whiteman School in Steamboat Springs and training on the freestyle teams at Winter Park Resort and the Steamboat Springs Winter Sports Club.

External videos
- Ryan Max Riley's winning run at US Champs in freestyle skiing moguls in 2001

Riley earned a bachelor's degree from Harvard University, where he wrote for The Harvard Lampoon. He later earned masters' degrees from Oxford University and Yale University.

Since 2015, Riley has owned The Distillery at Greylock WORKS, a cocktail bar and distillery in North Adams, Massachusetts.
