= Amanda Marie =

American painter

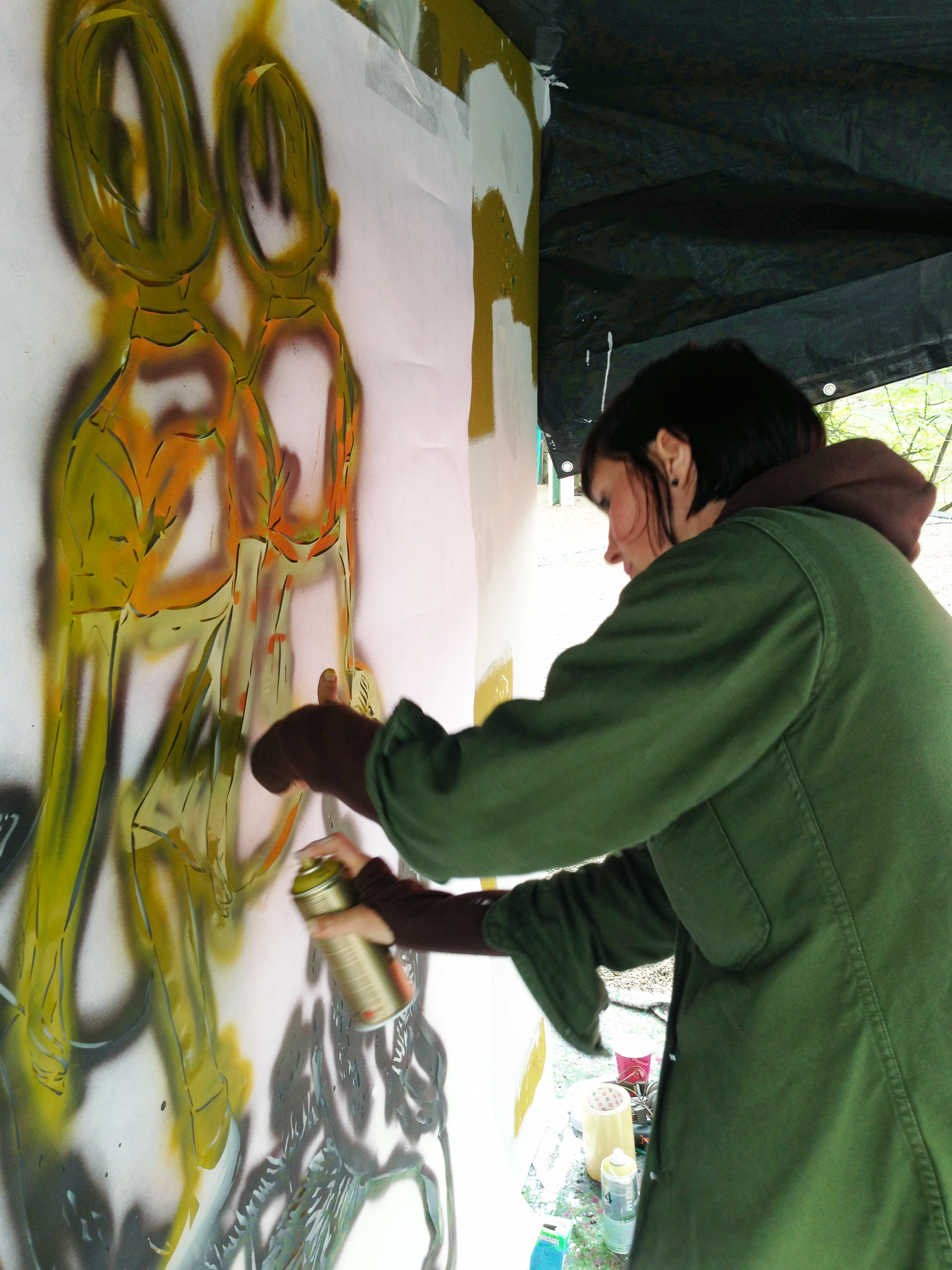
Amanda Marie painting in Munich, 2013

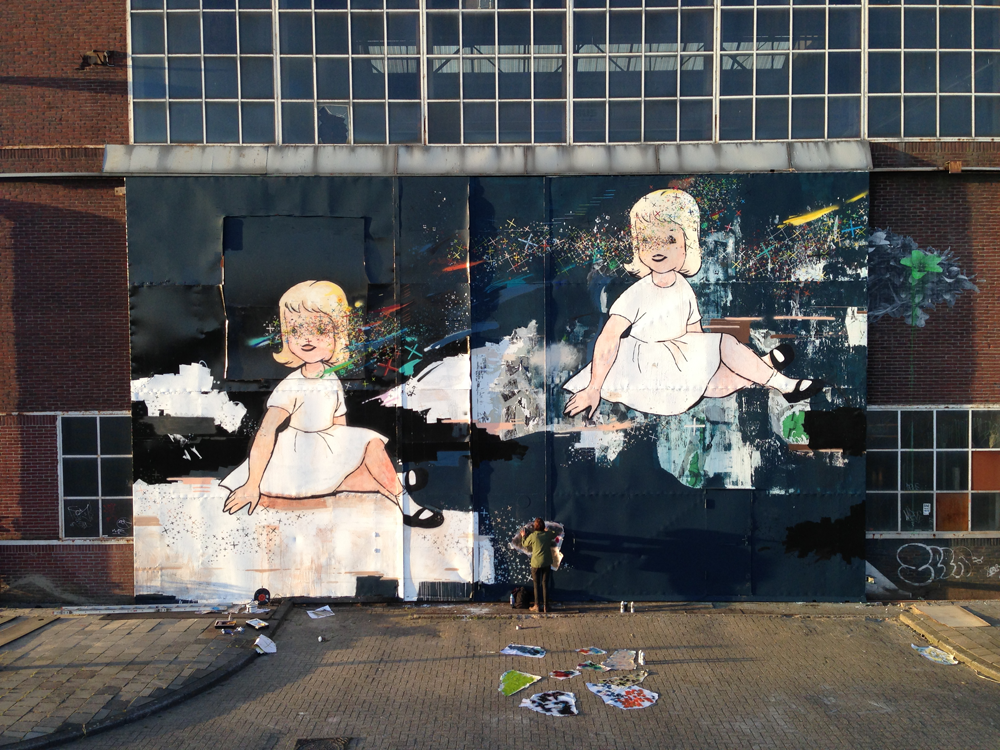
Installation of Imaginary Girls mural in Amsterdam, June 2013

Amanda Marie (full name Amanda Marie Ploegsma), also known by her artist moniker 'Mando Marie', born 1981, is an American painter formerly based in Colorado, currently based in Amsterdam, Netherlands, and exhibits in both the United States and Europe. She trained at Rocky Mountain College of Art and Design and is best known for her work as a stencilist, including large scale street art designs.

== Imagery and media ==
Amanda Marie uses graphic stencils and images redolent of 'Golden Age' storybook imagery. In an article for Frame Publishers' online magazine frameweb.com, Carmel McNamara said these images: "straddle a line between comforting and spooky". She frequently features the signature characters of a young boy and girl. In 2012, Boulder Museum of Contemporary Art held a solo exhibition of her work and noted that these stylised figures: "seem to have been lifted from the pages of a mid-twentieth century children’s book and have traded the protective home of childhood nostalgia for a slightly more adventurous and unsettling world, somewhere between dream and reality".

Alongside recurring graphic themes of children and animals, she favors twin, repeated or mirrored imagery, developed with multiple uses of the same stencil on the artwork. Her street art and outdoor paintings and murals incorporate the same primary technique of stencil painting on a large scale. In gallery, museum or other indoor exhibitions, she typically creates artworks using aerosol paint, acrylic and sewing pattern paper, on watercolor paper, canvas, or wood. She also uses screen printing technique and gel transfers. For outdoor work, the dominant materials are aerosol and acrylic.

In June 2015, Amanda Marie marked the façade of the Quin Hotel in New York City with a signature stencil as part of "Good Story", a solo exhibition curated by Hyland Mather and DK Johnston. Painted during her tenure as the hotel's artist in residence, the stencil commemorated her collaboration with the hotel and is positioned alongside an image of Andy Warhol, created by Blek le Rat.

== Notable exhibitions ==
=== 2015 ===
- December, SCOPE Art Fair, Miami, Florida
- July - Aug, Trailerpark Festival, Copenhagen, Denmark
- June, the Quin hotel, Good Story solo exhibition, New York, New York
- May, JSMA (Jordan Schnitzer Museum of Art), The Many Places We Are solo exhibition, Eugene, Oregon
- March, SCOPE Art Fair, New York, New York

=== 2014 ===
- July - August, Beautiful Times (beautifultimes.net) an art making adventure and experiment, Boulder, Colorado, New York, New York Philadelphia, Beacon, New York
- April, Center For Audio Visual Expression (C.A.V.E. Gallery), Balancing Act solo exhibition, Venice Beach, California
- January, White Walls Gallery, I Was Just Thinking solo exhibition, San Francisco, California

=== 2013 ===
- June, SCOPE Art Fair solo exhibition, Basel, Switzerland (Andenken Gallery)
- May, STROKE Art Fair group exhibition, Munich, Germany
- March, SCOPE Art Fair solo exhibition, New York, NY (Andenken Gallery). White Walls Gallery, While We Were Away group exhibition, San Francisco, California
- January, Center For Audio Visual Expression (C.A.V.E. Gallery), From Here On Out solo exhibition, Venice Beach, California

=== 2012 ===
- December, SCOPE Art Fair solo exhibition, Miami, Florida (Andenken Gallery)
- October, Moniker Art Fair solo exhibition, London, UK
- September, STROKE Art Fair group exhibition, Berlin, Germany
- August, LA Mixtape LeBasse Projects group exhibition, Los Angeles, California
- May–June, Kunst RAI Art Fair solo exhibition, Amsterdam, Netherlands
- May, Schunk Museum Newseum Pink Pop group exhibition, Heerlen, Netherlands
- March, Battalion Inaugural Exhibition group exhibition, Amsterdam, Netherlands

=== 2011 ===
- October, Moniker Art Fair group exhibition, London, UK.
- September, Andenken Gallery, See You Through It solo exhibition, Amsterdam, Netherlands. Illiterate Gallery It All Starts At Home solo exhibition, Denver, Colorado
- Fall 2011, Boulder Museum of Contemporary Art, Purity & Credence solo exhibition, Boulder, Colorado

=== 2010 ===
- October, Illiterate Gallery solo exhibition, Denver, Colorado
- May, Streetlab Project Space, Where On Earth Have You Been? group exhibition, Amsterdam, Netherlands

=== 2009 ===
- December, StreetLab Project Space, Mish Mash KaBash group exhibition, Amsterdam, Netherlands
- February, Andenken Gallery solo exhibition, Denver, Colorado

=== 2008 ===
- September, Plastic Chapel, Soft and Furry group exhibition, Denver, Colorado
- June, Andenken Gallery Merge three-person focus exhibition, Denver, Colorado
- May, Metropolis Gallery, two person exhibition, Lancaster, Pennsylvania

=== 2007 ===
- December, Transmission Gallery, An Unfinished Storygroup exhibition, Richmond, Virginia. Thinkspace, API Benefit Show group exhibition, Los Angeles, California
- August–October, Andenken Gallery, Generation Gap solo exhibition, Denver, Colorado

== Outdoor projects ==
- Imaginary Girls, Amsterdam, Netherlands – June 2013
- Skinny Dippers, Brooklyn, New York – March 2013
- Gravity Kids, San Francisco, California – January 2013
- Milk Girls, Greeley, Colorado – October 2012
- Concrete Monster, Atzlan Northside Skate Park Mural, Fort Collins, Colorado – summer 2011
- Urban Nature, Denver Botanic Gardens, Denver, Colorado – April–November 2008

== External sources ==
- Amanda Marie website
- Interview for Illiterate talks series on YouTube
