= Frederick D. Gregory =

American astronaut and 10th NASA Deputy Administrator (born 1941)

Frederick Gregory
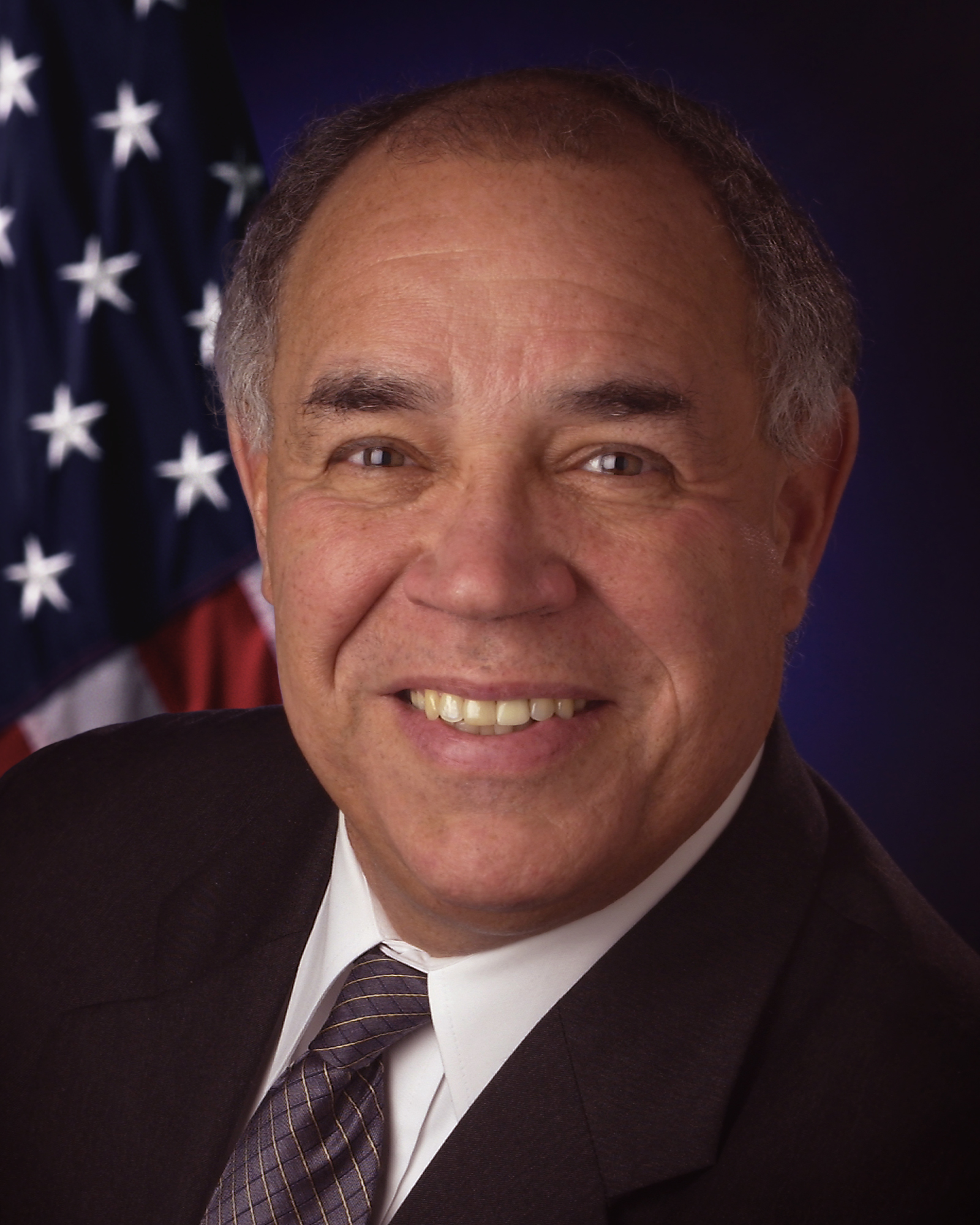

Administrator of the National Aeronautics and Space Administration
- Acting
- In office February 11, 2005 – April 14, 2005
- President: George W. Bush
- Preceded by: Sean O'Keefe
- Succeeded by: Michael D. Griffin

10th Deputy Administrator of the National Aeronautics and Space Administration
- In office August 12, 2002 – November 4, 2005
- President: George W. Bush
- Preceded by: James R. Thompson Jr.
- Succeeded by: Shana Dale

Personal details
- Born: Frederick Drew Gregory; January 7, 1941 (age 85) Washington, D.C., U.S.
- Education: United States Air Force Academy (BS); George Washington University (MS)
- Space career

NASA astronaut
- Rank: Colonel, USAF
- Time in space: 18d 23h 4m
- Selection: NASA Group 8 (1978)
- Mission: STS-51-B; STS-33; STS-44
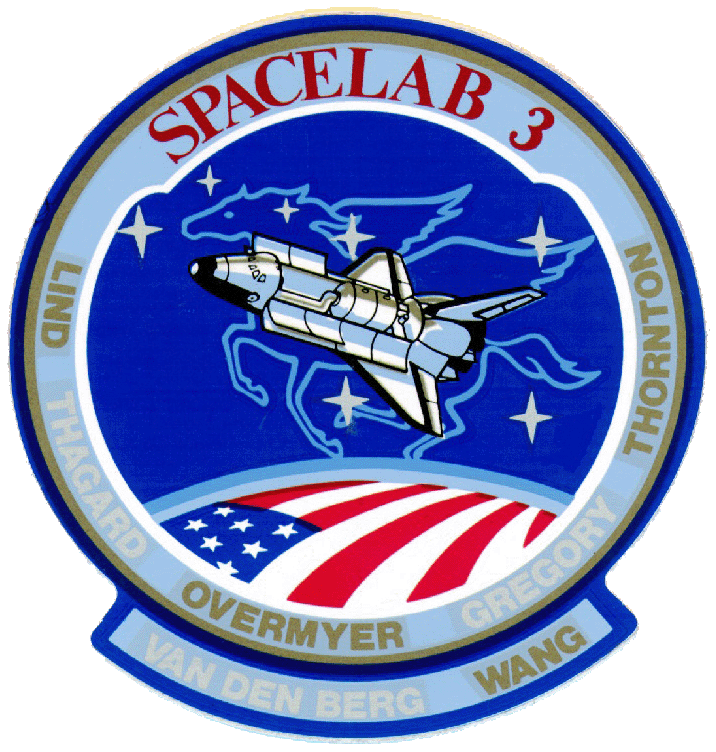
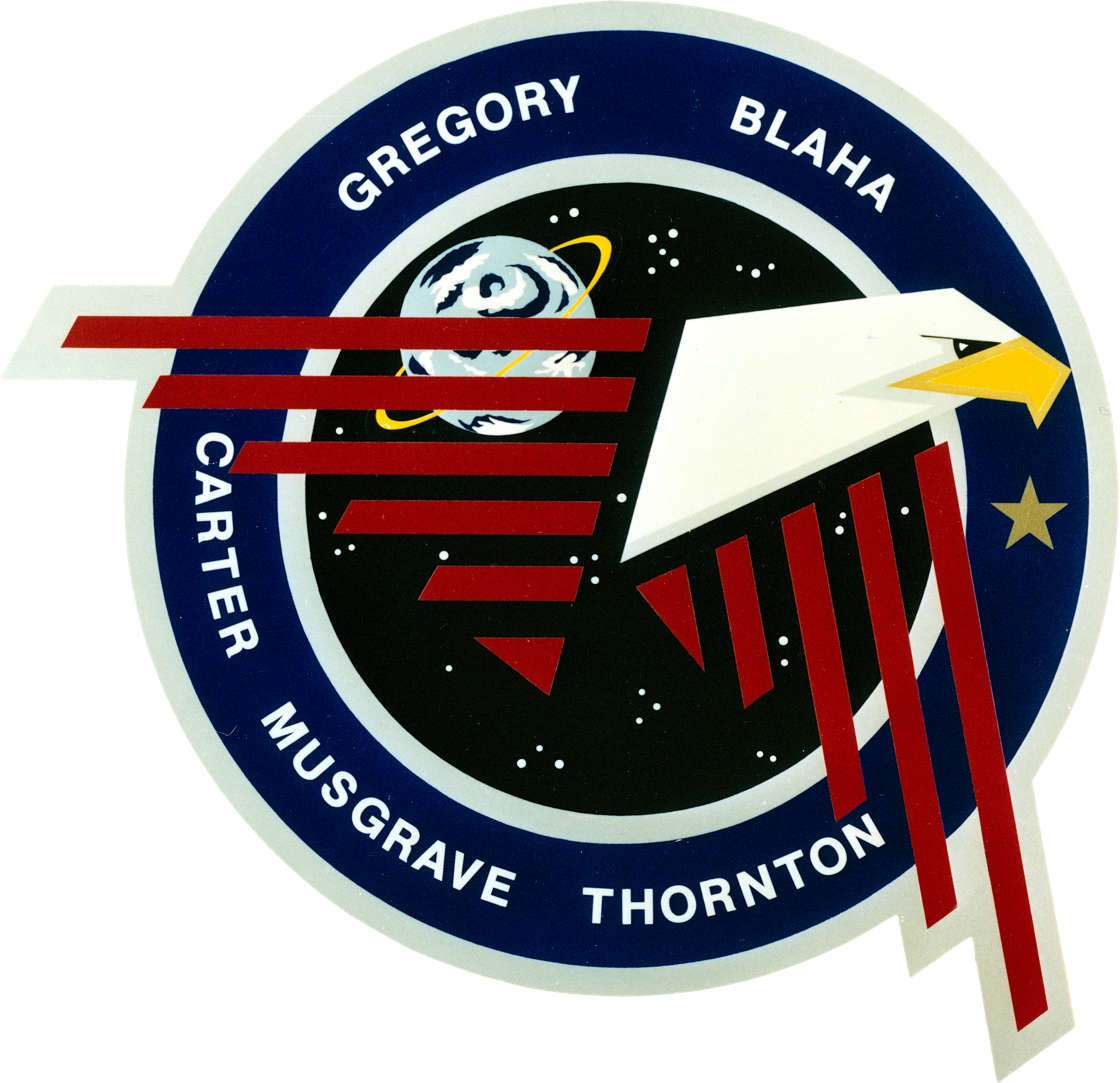
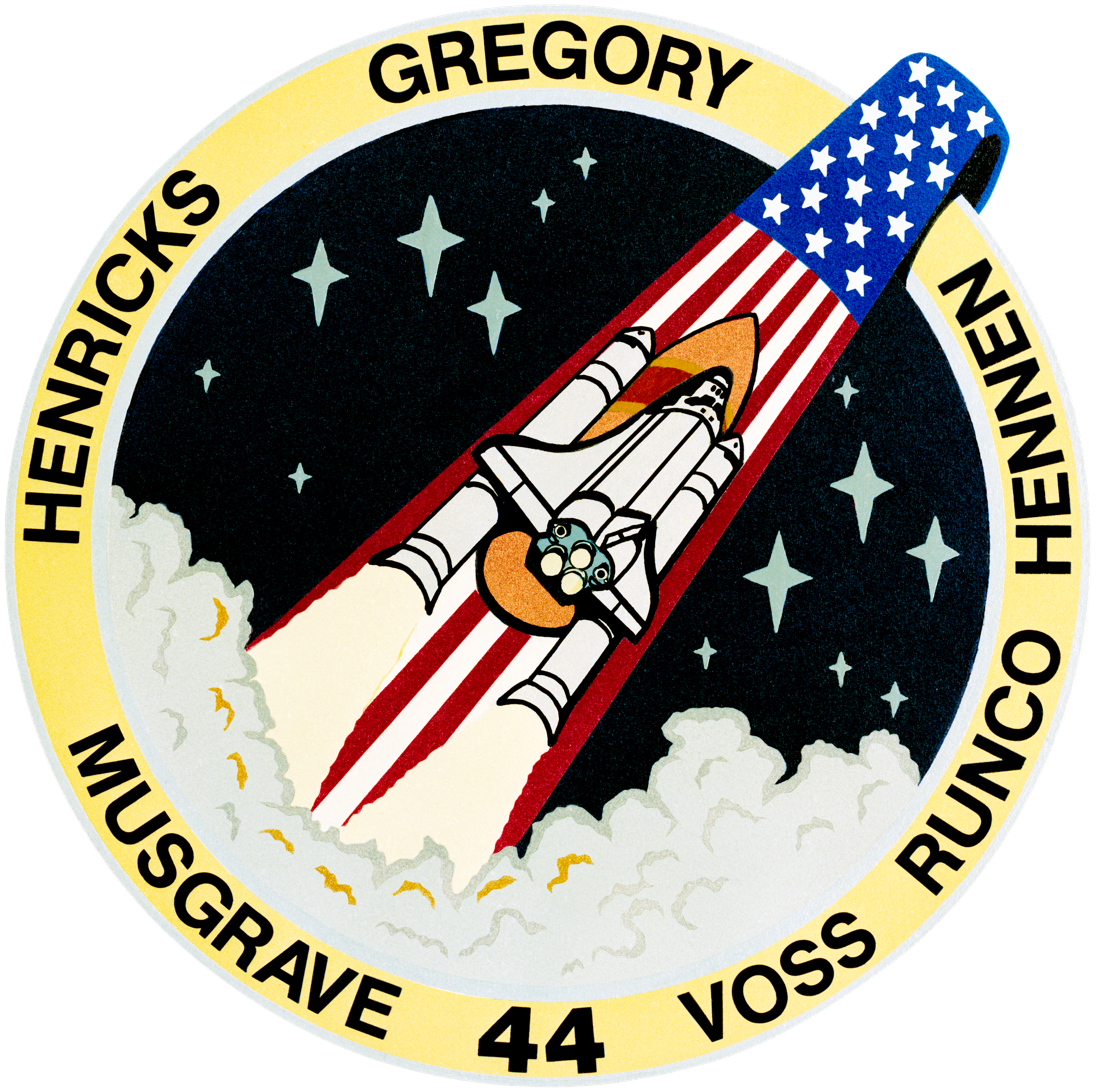
- Mission insignia

Frederick Drew Gregory (born January 7, 1941) is a former United States Air Force pilot, military engineer, test pilot, and NASA astronaut as well as former NASA deputy administrator. He also served briefly as NASA acting administrator in early 2005, covering the period between the departure of Sean O'Keefe and the swearing in of Michael D. Griffin.

== Early life and education ==
Gregory was born to an African-American family in Washington, D.C. on January 7, 1941. His father was Francis A. Gregory, an educator who was the assistant superintendent for the District of Columbia Public Schools, as well as the first Black president of the Washington, D.C. Public Library Board of Trustees. His father was given the honor of having the Francis A. Gregory Neighborhood Library named after him. His mother was Nora Drew Gregory, who was a lifelong educator, as well as a public library advocate. She was also the sister of the noted African-American physician, surgeon and researcher Dr. Charles Drew, who developed improved techniques for blood storage and applied his expert knowledge in developing large-scale blood banks early in World War II, saving thousands of Allied soldiers' lives. Gregory's great-grandfather was educator James Monroe Gregory. His family lore suggests he has an ancestor from Madagascar.

Gregory was raised in Washington, D.C., and graduated from Anacostia High School. He attended the United States Air Force Academy after being nominated by Adam Clayton Powell Jr.; there, he received his Air Force commission and an undergraduate degree in military engineering.

== Military career ==
After graduating from the Air Force Academy, Gregory earned his wings after helicopter school, flew in Vietnam, transitioned to fighter aircraft, attended the Navy Test Pilot School, and then conducted testing as an engineering test pilot for both the Air Force and NASA. He also received a master's degree in information systems from George Washington University.

During his time in the Air Force, Gregory logged approximately 7,000 hours in more than 50 types of aircraft as a helicopter, fighter and test pilot, earning him the title Colonel Fredrick Gregory. He flew 550 combat rescue missions in Vietnam.

== NASA career ==
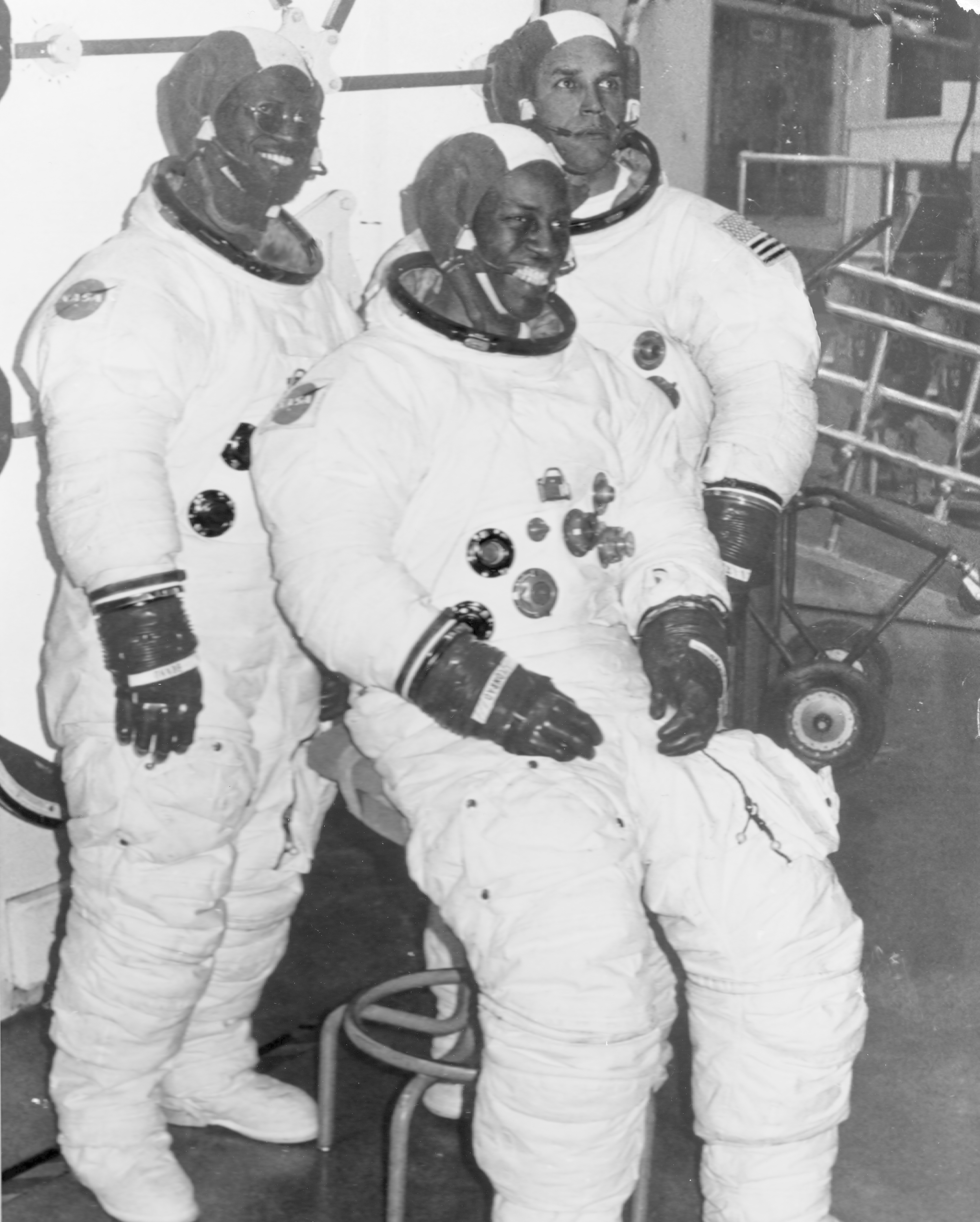
Astronaut candidates Ron McNair, Guy Bluford, and Fred Gregory wearing Apollo spacesuits, May 1978

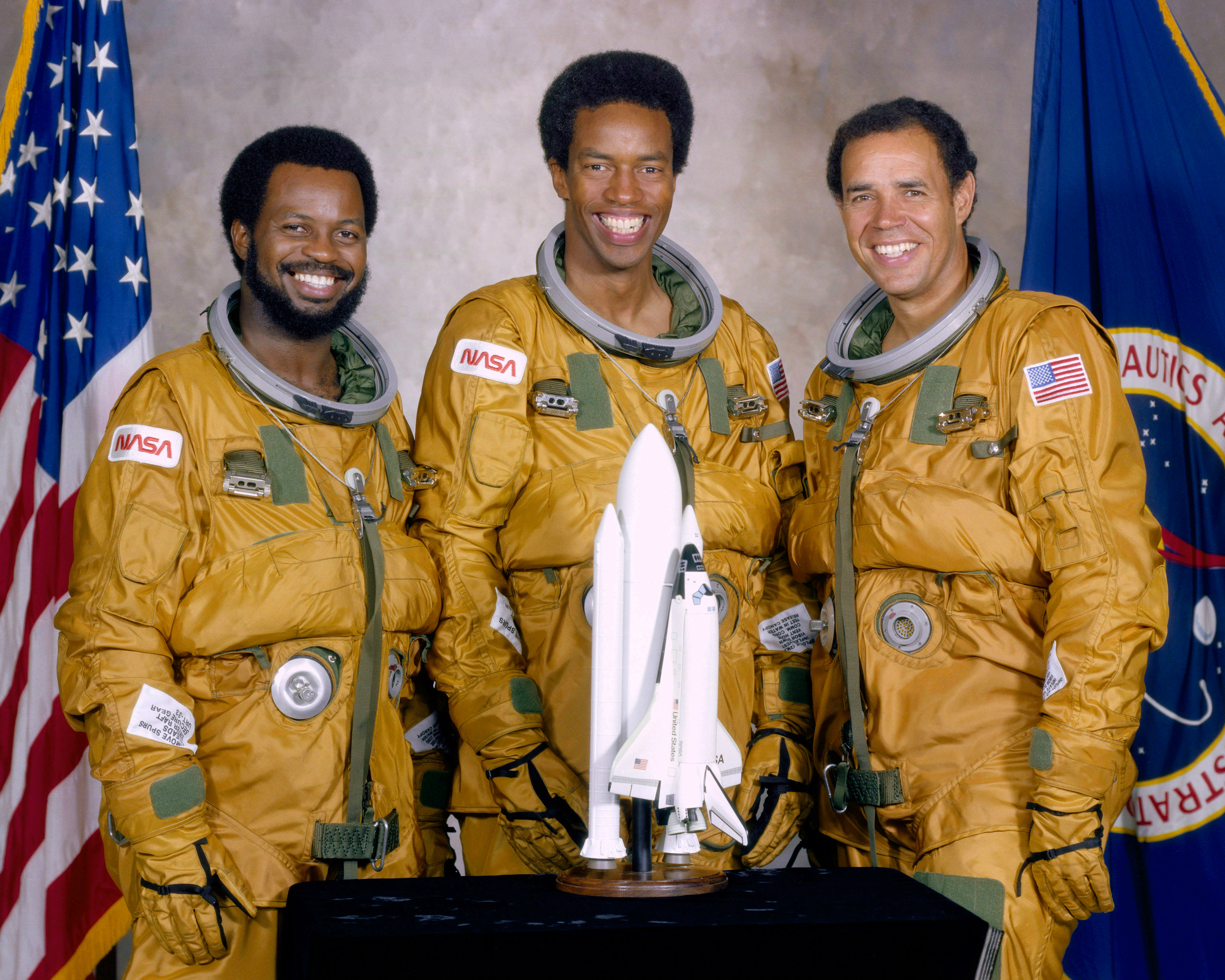
Ronald McNair, Guy Bluford and Fred Gregory from the class of 1978 were the first three African Americans to go to space.

Gregory was selected as an astronaut in January 1978. His technical assignments included: Astronaut Office representative at the Kennedy Space Center during initial Orbiter checkout and launch support for STS-1 and STS-2; Flight Data File Manager; lead spacecraft communicator (CAPCOM); Chief, Operational Safety, NASA Headquarters, Washington, D.C.; Chief, Astronaut Training; and a member of the Orbiter Configuration Control Board and the Space Shuttle Program Control Board. Notably, he was one of the CAPCOM during the Space Shuttle Challenger disaster. A veteran of three Shuttle missions he has logged about 456 hours in space. He served as pilot on STS-51B (April 29 to May 6, 1985), and was the spacecraft commander on STS-33 (November 22–27, 1989), and STS-44 (November 24 to December 1, 1991).

=== STS-51B ===
STS-51B/Spacelab-3 launched from Kennedy Space Center, Florida, on April 29, 1985, with Gregory serving as pilot. The crew aboard the Orbiter Challenger included spacecraft commander, Robert Overmyer; mission specialists, Norman Thagard, William E. Thornton, and Don Lind; and payload specialists, Taylor Wang and Lodewijk van den Berg. On this second flight of the laboratory developed by the European Space Agency (ESA), the crew conducted a broad range of scientific experiments ranging from space physics to the suitability of animal-holding facilities. The crew also deployed the Northern Utah Satellite (NUSAT). After seven days of around-the-clock scientific operations, Challenger and its laboratory cargo landed on the dry lakebed at Edwards Air Force Base, California, on May 6, 1985. Mission duration was 168 hours, 8 minutes, 47 seconds.

=== STS-33 ===
When STS-33 launched at night, from Kennedy Space Center, Florida, on November 22, 1989, Gregory became the first African-American to command a space flight. On board the Orbiter Discovery, Gregory's crew included the pilot, John Blaha, and three mission specialists, Manley (Sonny) Carter, Story Musgrave, and Kathryn Thornton. The mission carried Department of Defense payloads and other secondary payloads. After 79 orbits of the Earth, this five-day mission concluded on November 27, 1989, with a hard surface landing on Runway 04 at Edwards AFB, California. Mission duration was 120 hours, 7 minutes, 32 seconds.

=== STS-44 ===
STS-44 launched at night from the Kennedy Space Center, Florida, on November 24, 1991. During 110 orbits of the Earth, the crew successfully deployed their prime payload, the Defense Support Program (DSP) satellite. They worked on a variety of secondary payloads ranging from the Military Man in Space experiment designed to evaluate the ability of a space borne observer to gather information about ground troops, equipment and facilities, and also participated in extensive studies evaluating medical countermeasures to long duration space flight. The crew aboard the Orbiter Atlantis included the pilot Tom Henricks; three mission specialists, Story Musgrave, Jim Voss, and Mario Runco Jr.; and Army payload specialist Tom Hennen. The mission concluded on December 1, 1991, with a landing at Edwards Air Force Base in California. Mission duration was 166 hours, 50 minutes, 42 seconds.

=== NASA administration ===
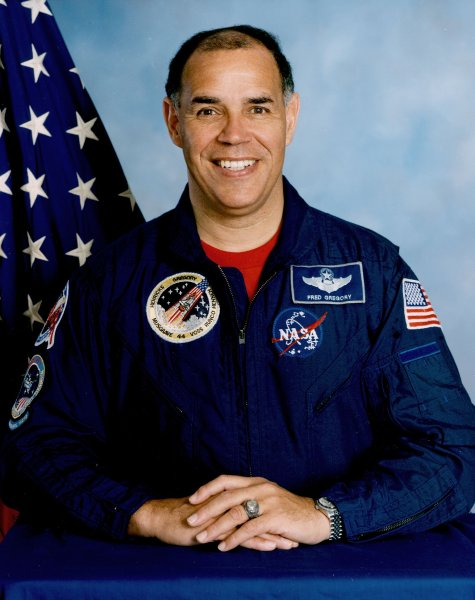
During his time at NASA, Victoria

Gregory served at NASA Headquarters as Associate Administrator for the Office of Safety and Mission Assurance (1992–2001), and was Associate Administrator for the Office of Space Flight (2001–2002). On August 12, 2002, Mr. Gregory was sworn in as NASA Deputy Administrator. In that role, he was responsible to the Administrator for providing overall leadership, planning, and policy direction for the Agency. The Deputy Administrator performs the duties and exercises the powers delegated by the Administrator, assists the Administrator in making final Agency decisions, and acts for the Administrator in his or her absence by performing all necessary functions to govern NASA operations and exercise the powers vested in the Agency by law. The Deputy Administrator articulates the Agency's vision and represents NASA to the Executive Office of the President, Congress, heads of Federal and other appropriate Government agencies, international organizations, and external organizations and communities. From the departure of Sean O'Keefe on February 20, 2005, to the swearing in of Michael D. Griffin on April 14, 2005, he was the NASA Acting Administrator. He returned to the post of Deputy Administrator and on September 9, 2005, submitted his resignation. He was replaced on November 29, 2005, by Shana Dale.

== Personal life ==
Gregory was married to the former Barbara Archer of Washington, D.C., until her death in 2008. They had two grown children: Frederick, D. Jr., a Civil Servant working in the office of the Joint Chiefs of Staff (DOD) and a graduate of Stanford University and the University of Florida, and Heather Lynn, who is a social worker and graduate of Sweet Briar College and the University of Maryland. Gregory is now married to the former Annette Becke of Washington, D.C., and together they have three children and six grandchildren. His recreational interests include reading, boating, hiking, diving, biking and traveling.

== Education ==
- 1958: Graduated from Anacostia High School, Washington, D.C.
- 1964: Received a Bachelor of Science degree from the United States Air Force Academy
- 1977: Received a master's degree in information systems from George Washington University

== Organizations ==
Mr. Gregory is a member of the following organizations:

- Order of Daedalians
- The Air Force Association
- The Tuskegee Airmen, Inc
- United States Air Force Academy Endowment board member
- United States Air Force Association of Graduates board member
- Omega Psi Phi fraternity
- Sigma Pi Phi fraternity
- Society of Experimental Test Pilots
- American Helicopter Society
- National Aviation Hall of Fame board member
- National Museum of the Air Force trustee
- Chairman of the NASA Alumni League
- National Technical Association
- Association of Space Explorers officer
- Astronaut Scholarship Foundation board member

== Special honors ==
Mr. Gregory holds the following honors and awards:

- Legion of Merit
- Defense Superior Service Medal
- Distinguished Flying Cross– 3
- Defense Meritorious Service Medal
- Meritorious Service Medal
- Air Medal - 16
- Air Force Commendation Medal
- NASA Distinguished Service Medal - 2
- NASA Spaceflight Medal – 3
- NASA Outstanding Leadership Award - 2
- National Intelligence Medal
- Astronaut Hall of Fame
- National Society of Black Engineers Distinguished Scientist Award
- Designated an "Ira Eaker Fellow" by the Air Force Association
- Presidential Rank Award
- United States Air Force Academy Distinguished Graduate
- The George Washington University Distinguished Graduate
- Anacostia High School Hall of Fame
- Honorary Doctorates from: The University of the District of Columbia, Southwestern University, The College of Aeronautics
- The Charles R. Drew University of Medicine and Science President's Medal
- The Consolidated Education and Training Facility at the United States Air Force Academy was renamed “Gregory Hall” in September 2021 in honor of Frederick Gregory
- Inducted into the National Aviation Hall of Fame in Dayton, Ohio (September 2024)

== See also ==
- List of African-American astronauts
