= List of African-American astronauts =

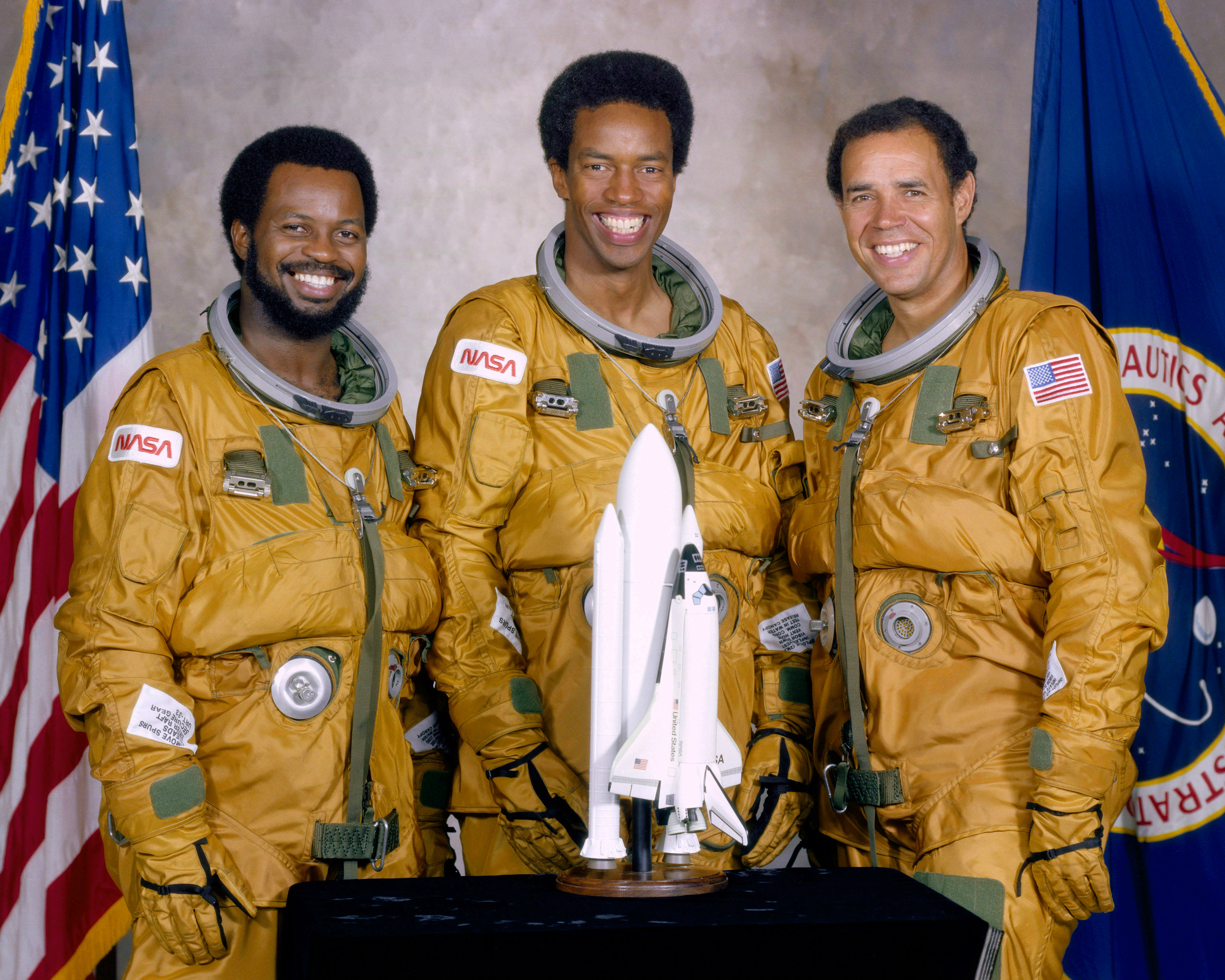
The first three African Americans to travel into space – Ron McNair, Guy Bluford and Fred Gregory

African-American astronauts are Americans of African descent who have been part of an astronaut program, regardless of whether they have traveled into space. African-Americans who have been passengers on space-tourist flights are also included in this article, although there is disagreement over whether such passengers should be referred to as "astronauts."

== African-American astronauts ==
=== Traveled into space ===
#	Image	Name & birth date	Notes	Missions & launch dates	Ref.
1		Guion Bluford; November 22, 1942	First African-American astronaut in space	STS-8 (August 30, 1983); STS-61-A (October 30, 1985); STS-39 (April 28, 1991); STS-53 (December 2, 1992)	
2		Ronald McNair; October 21, 1950 †January 28, 1986	First Baháʼí in space; died in the Space Shuttle Challenger disaster	STS-41-B (February 3, 1984); STS-51-L (January 28, 1986)	
3		Frederick D. Gregory; January 7, 1941	First African American to pilot and command a Space Shuttle mission; acting Administrator of NASA, 2005	STS-51-B (April 29, 1985); STS-33 (November 22, 1989); STS-44 (November 24, 1991)	
4		Charles Bolden; August 19, 1946	Administrator of NASA, July 17, 2009 – January 20, 2017	STS-61-C (January 12, 1986); STS-31 (April 24, 1990); STS-45 (March 24, 1992); STS-60 (February 3, 1994)	
5		Mae Jemison; October 17, 1956	First African-American woman in space	STS-47 (September 12, 1992)	
6		Bernard A. Harris Jr. June 26, 1956	First African American to walk in space	STS-55 (April 26, 1993); STS-63 (February 3, 1995)	
7		Winston E. Scott; August 6, 1950	Veteran of three spacewalks	STS-72 (January 11, 1996); STS-87 (November 19, 1997)	
8		Robert Curbeam; March 5, 1962	Veteran of seven spacewalks	STS-85 (August 7, 1997); STS-98 (February 7, 2001); STS-116 (December 9, 2006)	
9		Michael P. Anderson; December 25, 1959 †February 1, 2003	Died in the Space Shuttle Columbia disaster	STS-89 (January 22, 1998); STS-107 (January 16, 2003)	
10		Stephanie Wilson; September 27, 1966		STS-121 (July 4, 2006); STS-120 (October 23, 2007); STS-131 (April 5, 2010)	
11		Joan Higginbotham; August 3, 1964		STS-116 (December 9, 2006)	
12		Alvin Drew; November 5, 1962	Veteran of two spacewalks, February 28 and March 2, 2011	STS-118 (August 8, 2007); STS-133 (February 24, 2011)	
13		Leland D. Melvin; February 15, 1964	Associate Administrator for Education at NASA	STS-122 (February 7, 2008); STS-129 (November 16, 2009)	
14		Robert Satcher; September 22, 1965	EVA November 19 and November 23, 2009	STS-129 (November 16, 2009)	
15		Victor Glover; April 30, 1976	Joined ISS Expedition 64 as first African-American on an ISS Expedition. He flew around the moon during the Artemis II mission, becoming the first African-American to travel beyond low earth orbit.	SpaceX Crew-1 (November 15, 2020); Artemis II (April 1, 2026)	
16		Sian Proctor; March 28, 1970	First African American female Spacecraft Pilot, as part of Inspiration4. First African American commercial Astronaut.	Inspiration4 (September 16, 2021)	
17		Michael Strahan; November 21, 1971	First African American space tourist	Blue Origin NS-19 (December 11, 2021)	
18		Jessica Watkins; May 14, 1988	First African American woman to be an ISS expedition crew member	SpaceX Crew-4 (April 27, 2022)	
19		Jaison Robinson; September 25, 1980		Blue Origin NS-21 (June 4, 2022)	
20		Jeanette J. Epps; November 2, 1970	On August 4, 2023, NASA announced that Epps would join SpaceX Crew-8 that launched to space on March 4, 2024.	SpaceX Crew-8 (March 4, 2024)	
21		Ed Dwight; September 9, 1933	Considered as the first African-American astronaut candidate, Ed Dwight made it to the second round of an Air Force program from which NASA selected astronauts, but was not selected by NASA to be an astronaut. Resigned from the Air Force in 1966 due to racial politics. In May, 2024, Dwight flew on a Blue Origin space tourist launch that traveled more than 100 km above Earth's surface, becoming at age 90 the oldest person to have flown to space.	Blue Origin NS-25 (May 19, 2024)	
23		Christopher Williams; October 19, 1983	First African American to travel to space on board a Soyuz spacecraft	Soyuz MS-28 (November 27, 2025)	

=== Never traveled into space ===
Image	Name & birth date	Notes	Ref.
	Robert Henry Lawrence Jr. October 2, 1935 †December 8, 1967	First African-American astronaut; selected for astronaut training in 1967 for the MOL program; died in an aircraft accident	
	Livingston L. Holder Jr. September 29, 1956	USAF astronaut in the Manned Spaceflight Engineer Program	
	Michael E. Belt; September 9, 1957	Astronaut, payload specialist from TERRA SCOUT – US Army Project; retired January 12, 1991. Although he did not fly any shuttle missions during his time as an astronaut, he was the back-up payload specialist to Thomas J. Hennen for the STS-44 mission which deployed a military satellite, undergoing 9 months of astronaut training for the role He was selected as an astronaut through the US Army's Terra Scout program which was created specifically to support STS-44.	
	Yvonne Cagle; April 24, 1959	In NASA management	
	Andre Douglas; December 11, 1985	Backup crew member for Artemis II, primary crew member for Artemis III	
