= Francis Gregory (disambiguation) =

Francis Gregory (1789–1866) was a U.S. naval officer.

Frank or Francis Gregory may also refer to:

- Francis Gregory (bishop) (1848–1927), British Anglican colonial bishop
- Francis Gregory (sportsman) (1904–?), Cornish and professional wrestler, and rugby union and rugby league footballer
- Francis Thomas Gregory (1821–1888), English-born Australian explorer and politician
- Frank Gregory (baseball) (1888–1955), MLB player
- Francis Gregory (divine) (c. 1625–1707), English divine and schoolmaster
- Francis A. Gregory (1907–1977), educator and civic leader in Washington, DC
