= Francis A. Gregory =

Francis Anderson Gregory (8 December 1907 – 27 February 1977) was an educator and civic leader in Washington, DC. The Francis A. Gregory Neighborhood library serving the Fort Davis and Hillcrest communities was dedicated in his name in 1986.

Gregory was a native of Harrisburg, PA and grew up in Washington, DC. He attended Dunbar High School, graduating in 1924. He received Electrical Engineering degrees from Case Institute of Technology (1928) and Massachusetts Institute of Technology (1932). Gregory served as a teacher, principal and Assistant Superintendent at DC Public Schools. He also was an official of the United States Department of Labor.He was involved with numerous civic organizations and concerns, notably serving as the first Black president of the DC Public Library Board of Trustees.

Gregory was married to Nora Drew, sister of renowned surgeon and medical researcher Charles R. Drew. They have one son, retired NASA astronaut Frederick Drew Gregory.
