= STS-44 =

1991 American crewed spaceflight to deploy DSP-16

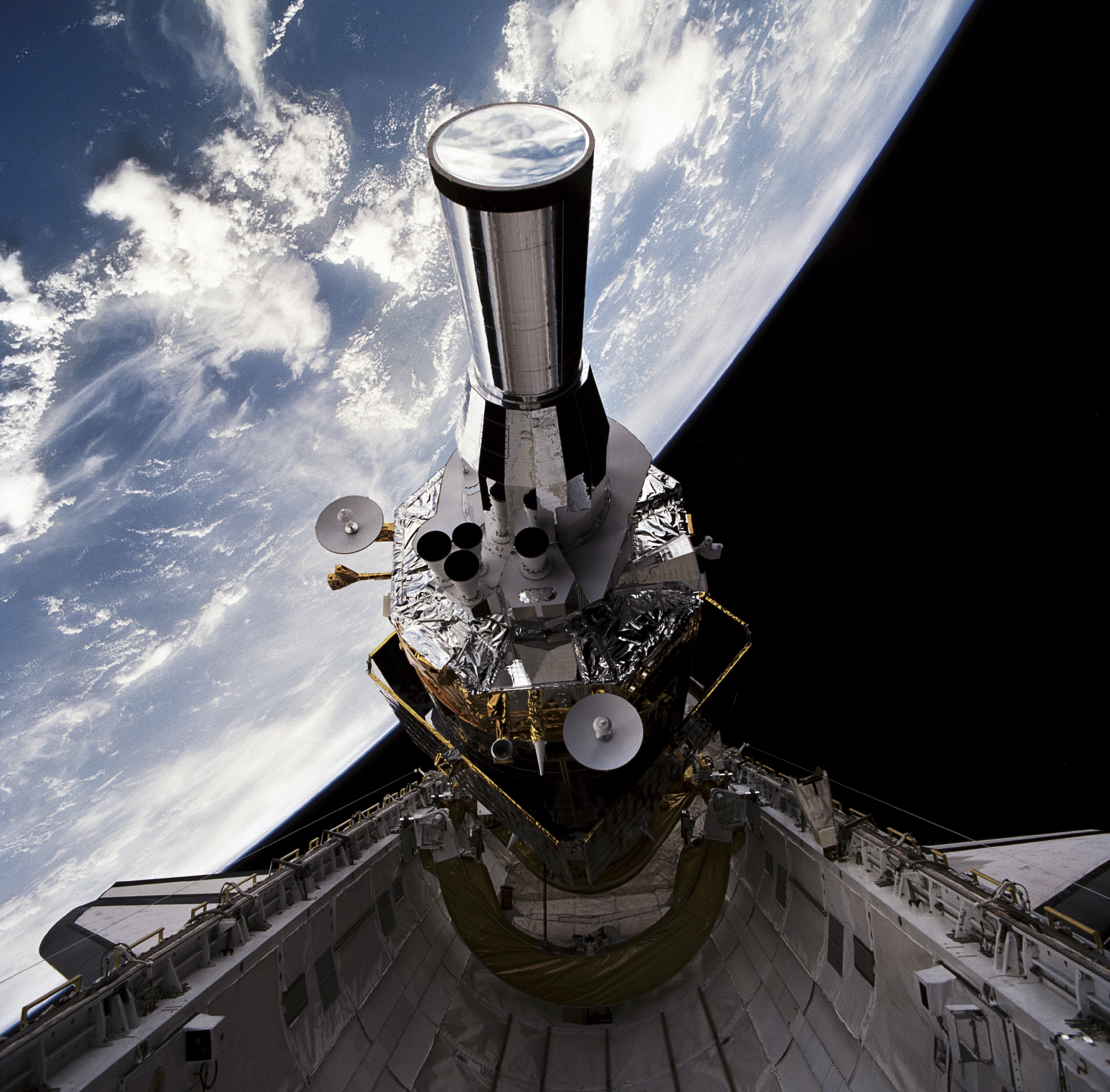
- Atlantis deploys a Defense Support Program (DSP) satellite.
- Names: Space Transportation System-44
- Mission type: DSP satellite deployment
- Operator: NASA
- COSPAR ID: 1991-080A
- SATCAT no.: 21795
- Mission duration: 6 days, 22 hours, 50 minutes, 43 seconds
- Distance travelled: 4,651,112 km (2,890,067 mi)
- Orbits completed: 110

Spacecraft properties
- Spacecraft: Space Shuttle Atlantis
- Launch mass: 117,766 kg (259,630 lb)
- Landing mass: 87,919 kg (193,828 lb)
- Payload mass: 20,240 kg (44,620 lb)

Crew
- Crew size: 6
- Members: Frederick D. Gregory; Terence T. Henricks; James S. Voss; Story Musgrave; Mario Runco Jr.; Thomas J. Hennen

Start of mission
- Launch date: November 24, 1991, 23:44:00 UTC (6:44 pm EST)
- Launch site: Kennedy, LC-39A
- Contractor: Rockwell International

End of mission
- Landing date: December 1, 1991, 22:34:43 UTC (2:34:43 pm PST)
- Landing site: Edwards, Runway 5

Orbital parameters
- Reference system: Geocentric orbit
- Regime: Low Earth orbit
- Perigee altitude: 363 km (226 mi)
- Apogee altitude: 371 km (231 mi)
- Inclination: 28.45°
- Period: 91.90 minutes

Instruments
- Air Force Maui Optical Site (AMOS); Bioreactor Flow; Cosmic Radiation Effects and Activation Monitor (CREAM); Extended Duration Orbiter Medical Project; Extended Duration Orbiter (EDO); Interim Operational Contamination Monitor (IOCM); Military Man in Space (M88-1); Radiation Monitoring Equipment (RME III); Shuttle Activation Monitor (SAM); Terra-Scout; Visual Function Tester (VFT-1)
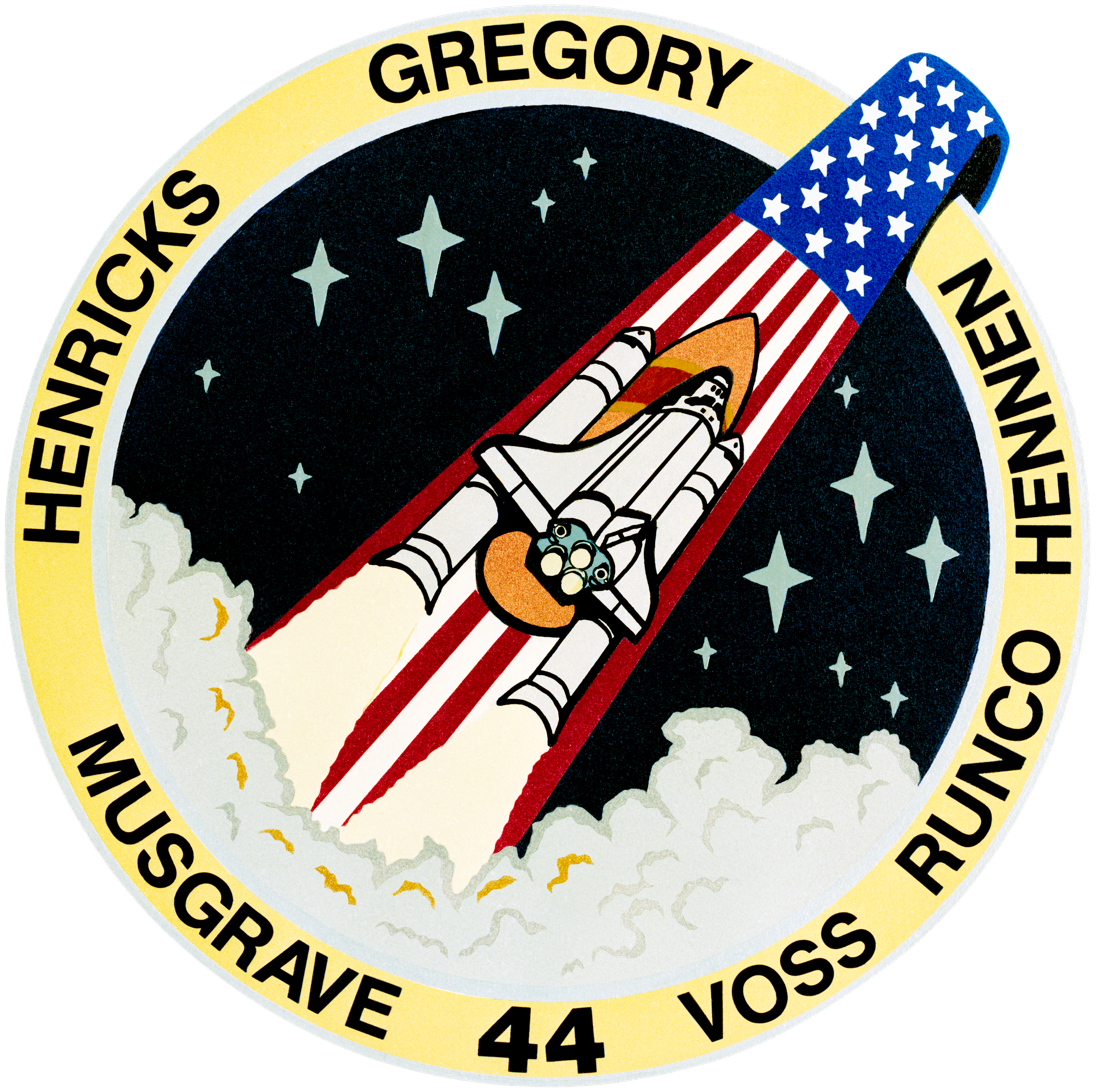
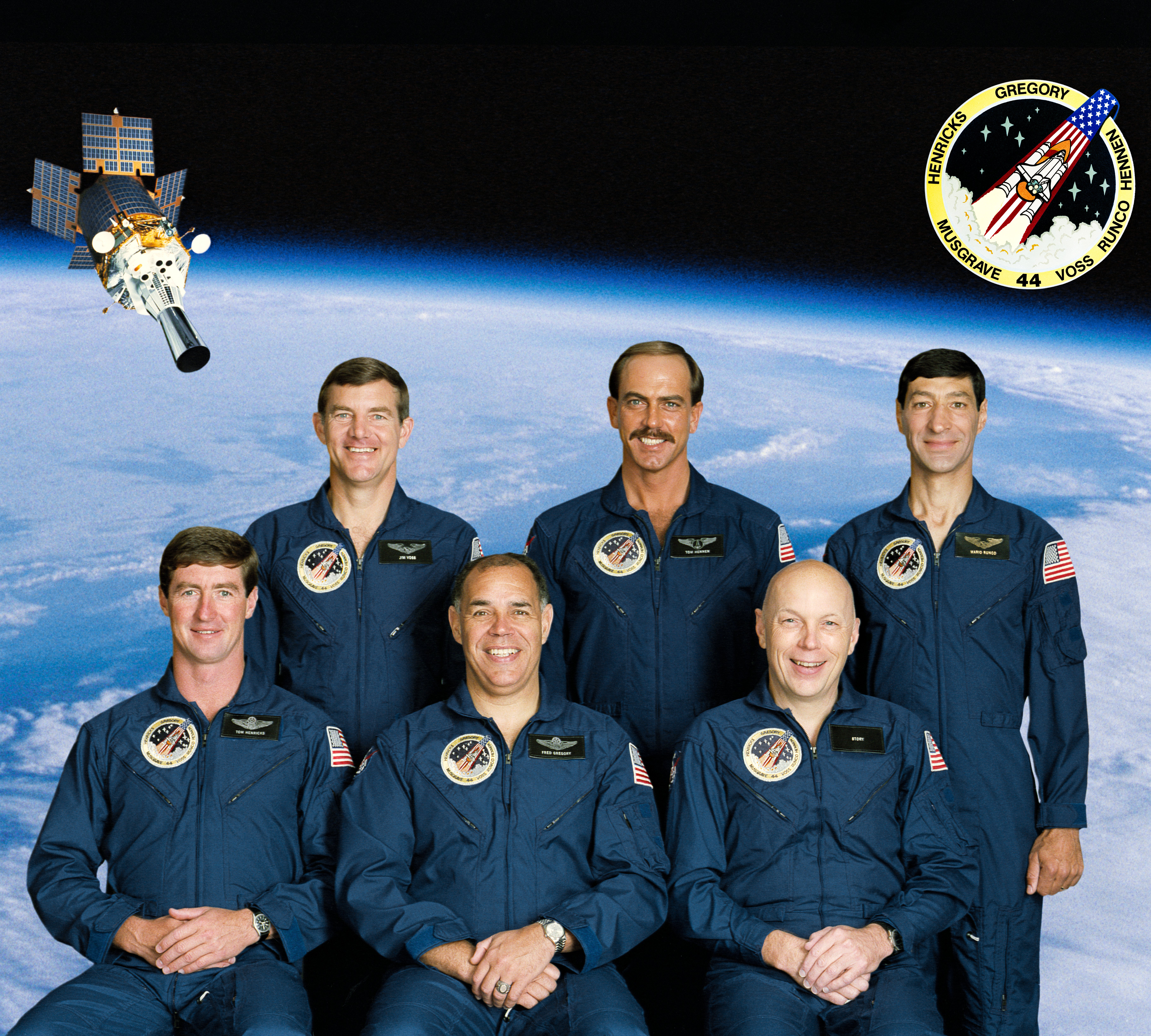
- STS-44 mission patch Standing: Voss, Hennen and Runco; Seated: Henricks, Gregory and Musgrave Space Shuttle program

STS-44 was a NASA Space Shuttle mission using Atlantis that launched on November 24, 1991. It was a U.S. Department of Defense (DoD) space mission.

== Crew ==
| Position | Astronaut |
|---|---|
| Commander | Frederick D. Gregory; Third and last spaceflight |
| Pilot | Terence T. Henricks; First spaceflight |
| Mission Specialist 1 | James S. Voss; First spaceflight |
| Mission Specialist 2 Flight Engineer | Story Musgrave; Fourth spaceflight |
| Mission Specialist 3 | Mario Runco Jr. First spaceflight |
| Payload Specialist 1 | Thomas J. Hennen; Only spaceflight |
David M. Walker was originally assigned as the commander of STS-44, however, after almost colliding with an airliner in 1989, he was suspended from training and replaced by Gregory. Walker would return to flight as commander of STS-53.

Backup crew
| Position | Astronaut |
|---|---|
| Payload Specialist 1 | Michael E. Belt |

=== Crew seat assignments ===
| Seat | Launch | Landing | Seats 1–4 are on the flight deck. Seats 5–7 are on the mid-deck. |
| 1 | Gregory | | Seats 1–4 are on the flight deck. Seats 5–7 are on the mid-deck. |
| 2 | Henricks | | Seats 1–4 are on the flight deck. Seats 5–7 are on the mid-deck. |
| 3 | Voss | Runco | Seats 1–4 are on the flight deck. Seats 5–7 are on the mid-deck. |
| 4 | Musgrave | | Seats 1–4 are on the flight deck. Seats 5–7 are on the mid-deck. |
| 5 | Runco | Voss | Seats 1–4 are on the flight deck. Seats 5–7 are on the mid-deck. |
| 6 | Hennen | | Seats 1–4 are on the flight deck. Seats 5–7 are on the mid-deck. |
| 7 | Unused | | Seats 1–4 are on the flight deck. Seats 5–7 are on the mid-deck. |

== Mission highlights ==
| Attempt | Planned | Result | Turnaround | Reason | Decision point | Weather go (%) | Notes |
|---|---|---|---|---|---|---|---|
| 1 | 19 Nov 1991, 6:51:00 pm | Scrubbed | — | Technical | 19 Nov 1991, 10:00 am (T−09:00:00) | | Inertial measurement unit malfunction on IUS. |
| 2 | 24 Nov 1991, 6:44:00 pm | Success | 4 days 23 hours 53 minutes | | | | T−9 minute hold extended for 13 minutes to fix a leaking Liquid Oxygen replenish valve and allow an orbiting spacecraft to pass over the launch site. |

The launch was on November 24, 1991, at 23:44:00 UTC. A launch set for November 19, 1991, was delayed due to replacement and testing of a malfunctioning redundant inertial measurement unit on the Inertial Upper Stage (IUS) booster attached to the Defense Support Program (DSP) satellite. The launch was reset for November 24 and was delayed by 13 minutes to allow an orbiting spacecraft to pass and to allow external tank liquid oxygen replenishment after minor repairs to a valve in the liquid oxygen replenishment system in the mobile launcher platform. Launch weight was 117,766 kilograms (259,630 lb).

The mission was dedicated to the Department of Defense. The unclassified payload included a Defense Support Program (DSP) satellite, DSP-16 attached to Inertial Upper Stage (IUS-14), deployed on flight day one. Cargo bay and middeck payloads included the Interim Operational Contamination Monitor (IOCM), Terra-Scout, Military Man in Space (M88-1), Air Force Maui Optical Site (AMOS), Cosmic Radiation Effects and Activation Monitor (CREAM), Shuttle Activation Monitor (SAM), Radiation Monitoring Equipment (RME III), Visual Function Tester (VFT-1), Bioreactor Flow, and Extended Duration Orbiter Medical Project, a series of investigations in support of Extended Duration Orbiter. The Ultraviolet Plume Instrument (UVPI) experiment was located on board the previously launched LACE satellite, and could've been pointed at Atlantis on-orbit to observe the shuttle's thruster firings. However, no opportunities or intersections occurred during this mission.

The landing was on December 1, 1991, at 22:34:44 UTC, Runway 5, Edwards Air Force Base, California. The rollout distance was 3,411 m (11,191 ft), and the rollout time was 107 seconds. The landing weight was 87,918 kg (193,826 lb). The landing was originally scheduled for Kennedy Space Center on December 4, 1991, but the ten-day mission was shortened and the landing rescheduled following the November 30, 1991, on-orbit failure of one of three orbiter inertial measurement units. The lengthy rollout was due to minimal braking for test. Atlantis returned to Kennedy on December 8, 1991. This was also the final shuttle landing on a dry lake bed runway.

== Wake-up calls ==
NASA began a tradition of playing music to astronauts during the Project Gemini, and first used music to wake up a flight crew during Apollo 15. Each track is specially chosen, often by the astronauts' families, and usually has a special meaning to an individual member of the crew, or is applicable to their daily activities.

| Day | Song | Artist | Played/For |
|---|---|---|---|
| 2 | Recorded message from Patrick Stewart | | Mario Runco |
| 3 | This Is the Army | Irving Berlin | |
| 4 | It's Time to Love (Put a little love in your heart) | James Brown | |
| 5 | Cheesburger in Paradise | Jimmy Buffett | |
| 6 | Twist and Shout from Ferris Bueller's Day Off | | |
| 7 | University of Alabama and Auburn University fight songs | | Jim Voss and Jan Davis |
| 8 | In the Mood | | |

== See also ==
- List of human spaceflights
- List of Space Shuttle missions
- Militarization of space
- Nikon NASA F4
- Outline of space science
