= Francis A. Gregory Neighborhood Library =

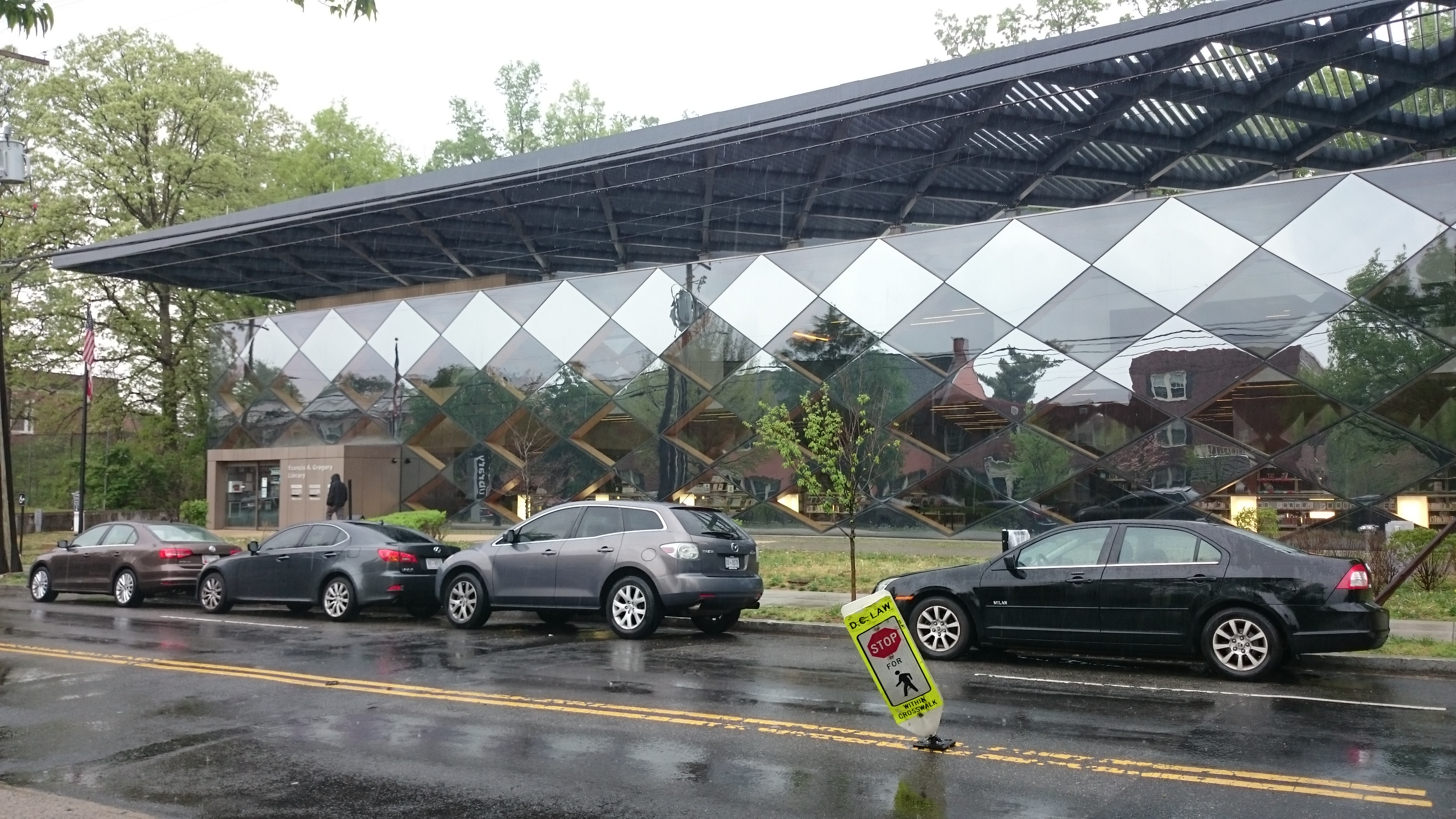
- 38.86485°N 76.95419°W
- Location: 3660 Alabama Ave. S.E., Washington, D.C. 20019, United States
- Type: Public library
- Established: 1961
- Branch of: District of Columbia Public Library

Other information
- Website: http://dclibrary.org/francis

Francis A. Gregory Neighborhood Library is part of the District of Columbia Public Library (DCPL) System. It was originally opened to the public in 1961. A new building on the same site, designed by award-winning architect David Adjaye, opened on June 19, 2012.

== History ==
The original Francis A. Gregory Library was built in 1961 as the fifth of eleven branch libraries funded under a public works program for the District of Columbia. The original building was designed by architect Victor DeMers. Originally named the Fort Davis Branch, the library opened in January 1961 on former parkland (Fort Davis Park) that was transferred to the District from the National Capital Planning Commission. In 1986, the library was named for Francis A. Gregory, a local public servant who had been the first black president of the DC Public Library Board of Trustees.

The new Francis A. Gregory Library was described in Architectural Record as a “shimmering pavilion.” The building is a two-story, glass-sheathed box with an aluminum roof that juts out over every side. It cost $11 million to construct and is a LEED Gold-certified building.

== See also ==
- District of Columbia Public Library
- Fort Davis (Washington, D.C.)
