= James S. Voss =

American astronaut and US Army colonel (born 1949)

James Voss
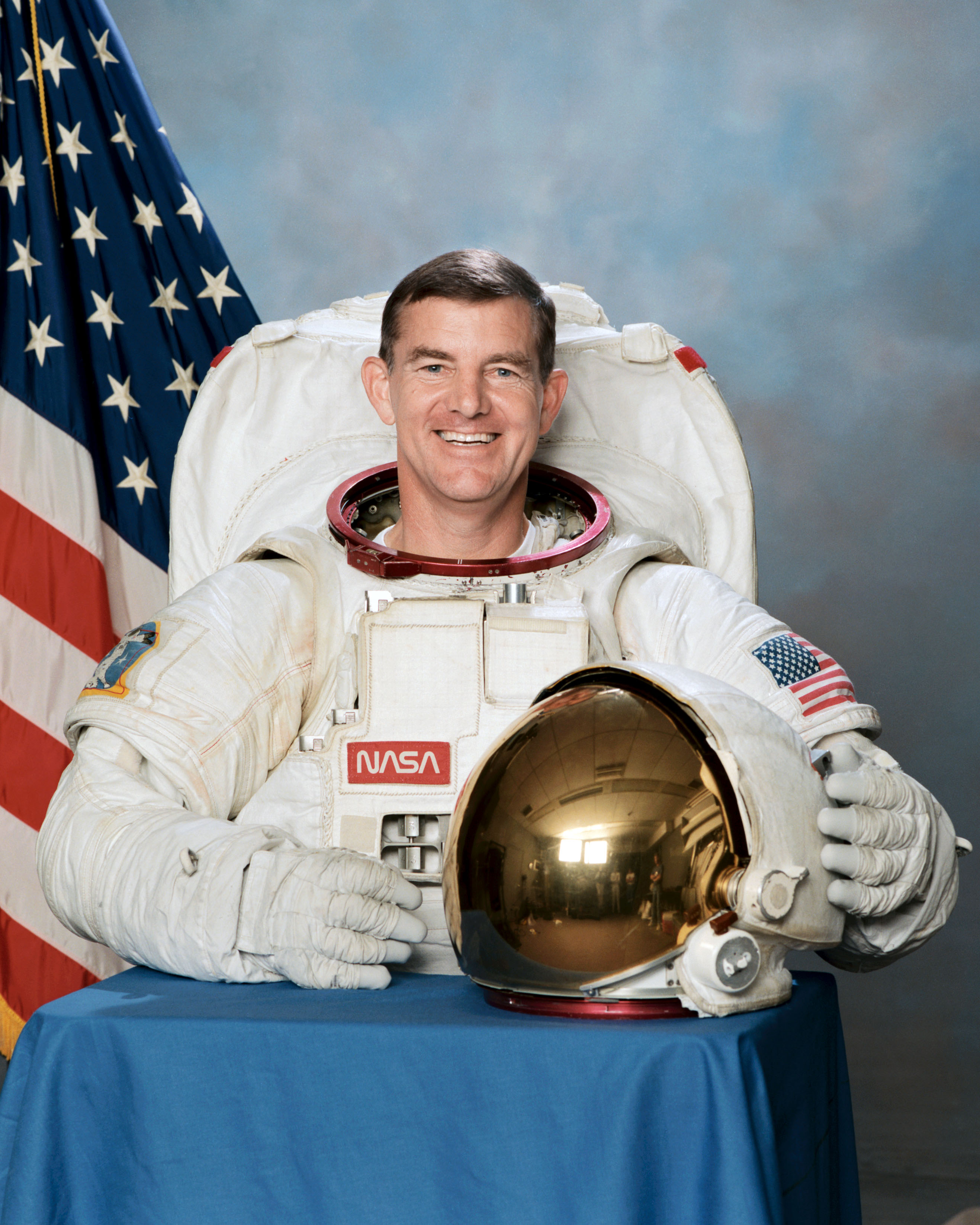
- Born: March 3, 1949 (age 77); Cordova, Alabama, U.S.
- Education: Auburn University (BS); University of Colorado Boulder (MS)
- Space career

NASA astronaut
- Rank: Colonel, USA
- Time in space: 202d 5h 28m
- Selection: NASA Group 12 (1987)
- Total EVAs: 4
- Total EVA time: 22h, 45m
- Missions: STS-44; STS-53; STS-69; STS-101; Expedition 2 (STS-102 / STS-105)

James Shelton Voss (born March 3, 1949) is a retired United States Army colonel and NASA astronaut. During his time with NASA, Voss flew in space five times on board the Space Shuttle and International Space Station. He also served as deputy of Flight Operations for the Space Station Program Mission Integration and Operations Office.

He was a Scholar in Residence at the University of Colorado until his retirement in May 2025.

== Early life and education ==
James Shelton Voss was born on March 3, 1949, in Cordova, Alabama, and was raised by his grandparents in Opelika, Alabama. As a child he read a lot of science fiction with an emphasis on spaceflight. While attending Opelika High School he participated in wrestling, track and field, and football.

After graduating high school, Voss attended Auburn University. As an undergraduate, he wrestled on the Auburn University wrestling team. He was also a member of Beta Zeta chapter of the Theta Xi fraternity, where he served as Chapter President for the school year 1970–71. While at Auburn, Voss also was in the in Army Reserve Officers' Training Corps. After graduating with a Bachelor of Science degree in Aerospace Engineering in 1972 he was commissioned as a second lieutenant in the U.S. Army. Under the Army Graduate Fellowship Program, Voss was allowed to defer his entry into active duty in order to attend the University of Colorado Boulder. He graduated in 1974 with a Master of Science degree in Aerospace Engineering Sciences.

== Army career ==
After receiving his master's degree, Voss attended the Infantry Basic Course in 1974 where he was listed as a Distinguished Graduate. He then attended Airborne School and Ranger School, at the latter he was awarded the Honor Graduate and Leadership Award. Voss was then stationed with the 2nd Battalion, 48th Infantry Regiment in West Germany serving as a platoon leader, intelligence staff officer, and C company commander. He returned to the United States and attended the Infantry Officer Advanced Course in 1979, making the Commandant's List. He taught in the Department of Mechanics at the United States Military Academy at West Point. While at West Point, Voss participated in a NASA Summer Faculty Research Fellowship and received the William P. Clements Jr. Award for Excellence in Education as the outstanding professor at the Academy. Voss then attended the U.S. Naval Test Pilot School, graduating with the Outstanding Student Award in 1983. He then attended the Armed Forces Staff College. Voss was subsequently assigned as a Flight Test Engineer/Research and Development Coordinator with the U.S. Army Aviation Engineering Flight Activity. He participated in major flight test programs before being assigned to NASA. At NASA, Voss worked at the Johnson Space Center from November 1984 to June 1987. He worked as a Vehicle Integration Test Engineer supporting the STS-51-D, STS-51-F, STS-61-C, and STS-51-L missions. After the Challenger accident, Voss participated in the investigation. He was selected by NASA as an astronaut candidate in June 1987.

== Astronaut career ==
Selected as an astronaut candidate by NASA in June 1987, Voss completed a one-year training and evaluation program in August 1988, which qualified him for assignment as a mission specialist on Space Shuttle flights. He has worked as a flight crew representative in the area of Shuttle safety, as a CAPCOM, providing a communications interface between ground controllers and flight crews during simulations and Shuttle flights, and as the Astronaut Office Training Officer. After his third spaceflight, Voss spent two years training at the Yuri Gagarin Cosmonaut Training Center in Star City, Russia. He served as a backup to Michael Foale on the STS-84/Mir 23/Mir 24/STS-86 mission and to Andrew Thomas for the STS-89/Mir 24/Mir 25/STS-91 mission. After his fifth flight, Voss served as the Deputy for Flight Operations in the Space Station Program Mission Integration and Operations Office.

=== Spaceflight experience ===
==== STS-44 ====
Voss was a mission specialist on board Space Shuttle Atlantis during STS-44 from November 24 – December 1, 1991. The mission's primary objective was the deployment of a Defense Support Program satellite with an Inertial Upper Stage booster rocket. The crew also conducted two Military Man in Space experiments, three radiation monitoring experiments, and numerous medical tests to support longer duration spaceflight. The mission orbited the Earth 110 times before returning to Edwards Air Force Base in California.

==== STS-53 ====
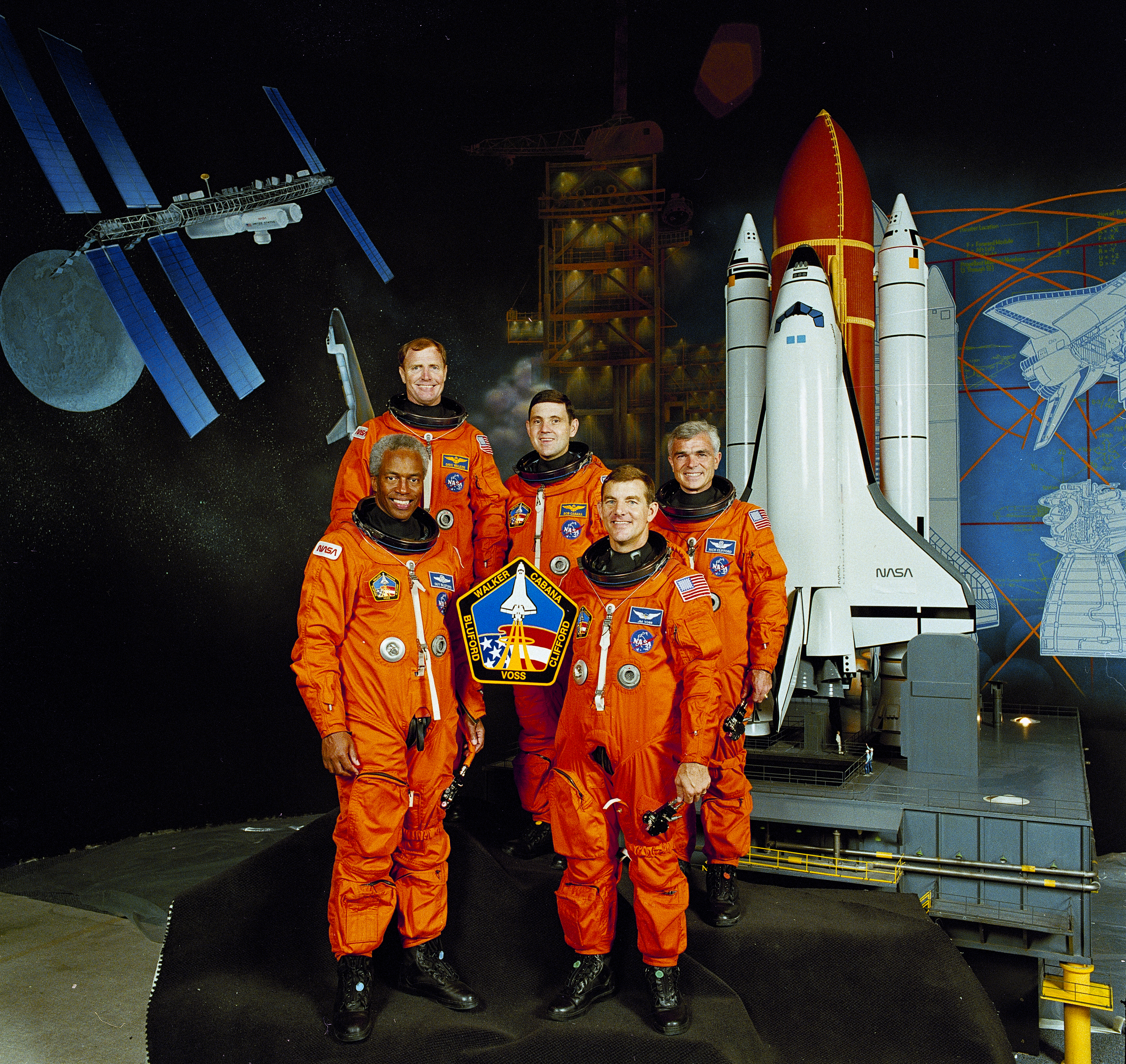
The STS-53 crew. Voss is second from the right.

From December 2–9, 1992, Voss flew as a mission specialist on STS-53. The 171 orbit flight of the Space Shuttle Discovery deployed a classified Department of Defense payload. The satellite was the second launch of a Satellite Data System-2 military communications satellite.

==== STS-69 ====
During STS-69, Voss was a mission specialist and payload commander on board Space Shuttle Endeavour. The flight, which orbited the Earth 171 times from September 7–18, 1995, successfully deployed a SPARTAN satellite and the Wake Shield Facility. Also on board was the International Extreme Ultraviolet Hitchhiker Payload as well as various medical experiments. Voss and Michael Gernhardt performed a six-hour spacewalk in order to test space suit modifications and to evaluate tools and procedures for future use on the International Space Station.

==== STS-101 ====
Voss was a mission specialist on board Space Shuttle Atlantis on STS-101. The Shuttle visited the then-unmanned International Space Station and delivered over 3,000 pounds of equipment and supplies. The crew also repaired the Station's electrical and environmental control systems. At the time of the flight Jim was already assigned to fly on Expedition 2. His crewmates Yuri Usachev and Susan Helms flew with him on Atlantis in order to gain experience for their future long-duration stay. Jim and Jeff Williams conducted a six-hour spacewalk to finish installation of a Russian crane, replace a faulty antenna, and install handrails on the outside of the station.

==== STS-102 ====
Voss and his Expedition 2 crewmates launched as Mission Specialists March 8, 2001, on board Space Shuttle Discovery during the STS-102 mission. The primary objectives of the flight were to rotate crew members and to resupply the station using the Multi-Purpose Logistics Module. Voss participated in one of the missions two spacewalks, along with Susan Helms, to prepare a Pressurized Mating Adapter for relocation. The spacewalk set a record of 8 hours 56 minutes duration, that withstood until, it was broken by two Chinese astronauts on 17 December 2024.

==== Expedition 2 ====
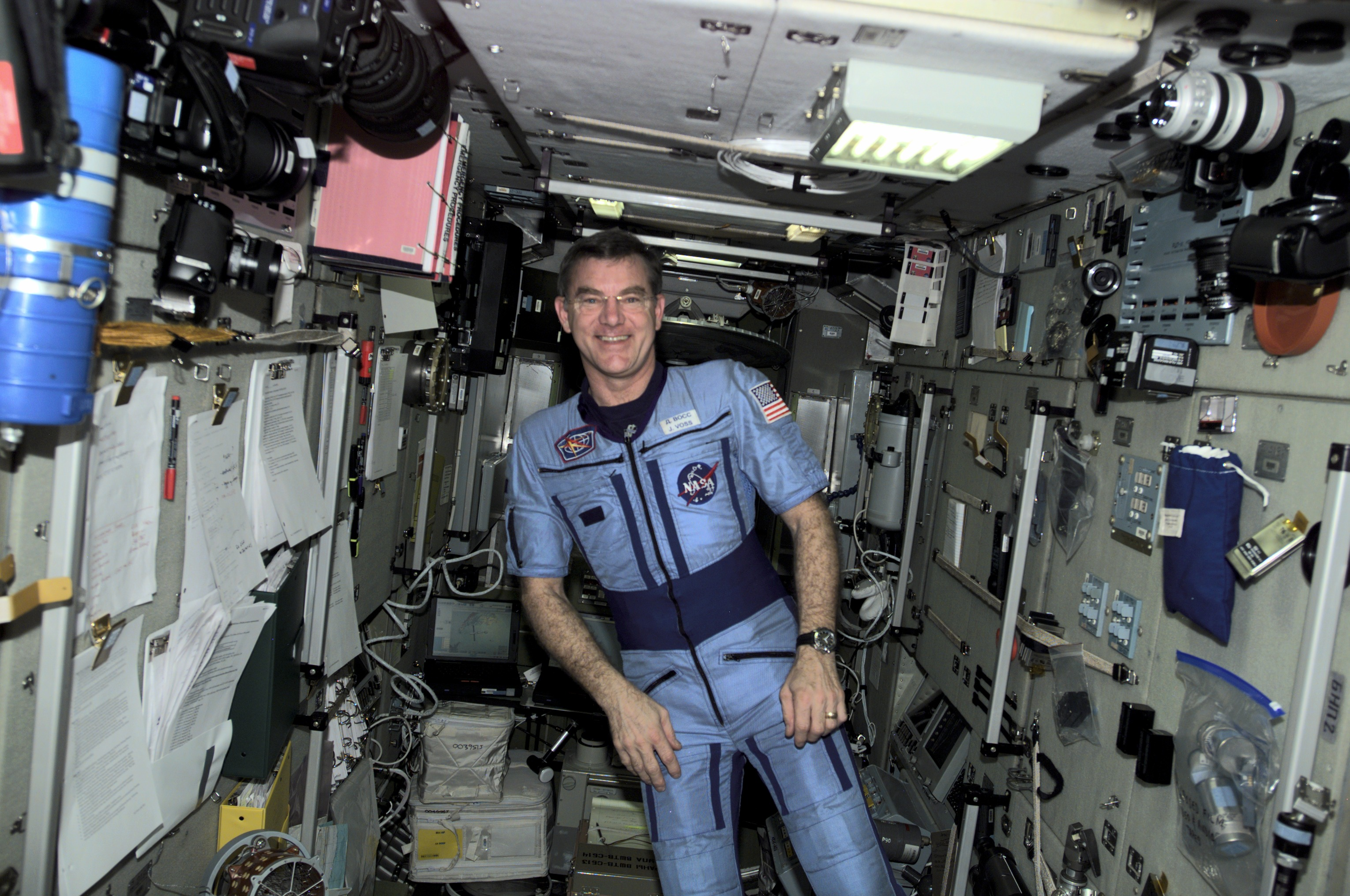
Voss on board the International Space Station during Expedition 2

Voss, Susan Helms, and Yuri Usachev spent 163 days aboard the International Space Station conducting 18 scientific experiments, maintenance, and outfitting. During the flight, Jim (who was a Flight Engineer) was the first person to operate the Space Station Robotic Manipulator System (Canadarm2). He also participated in a 19-minute EVA, in which Voss and Usachev prepared a docking probe for the arrival of the Pirs Docking Compartment. During Jim's stay on the ISS, the space station was visited by two unmanned cargo vehicles, the Soyuz TM-32 taxi mission, as well as two Space Shuttles (STS-100 and STS-104). Voss was also on board to witness the arrival of the Quest Airlock. He was one of the cinematographers and featured astronauts of the first 3D film shot in space, Space Station 3D. The film was released in theaters in 2002 and on DVD in 2005.

==== STS-105 ====
Voss returned home from his fifth spaceflight as a mission specialist on board the Space Shuttle Discovery on August 20, 2001 (STS-105). The mission saw a crew rotation, two spacewalks, and another flight of the MPLM.

== Post-NASA career ==
After retiring from NASA in 2003, Voss became Associate Dean of Engineering for External Affairs at Auburn University, assisting with student projects and development for the College and teaching a class in Aerospace Engineering on human spacecraft design. While at Auburn he led a team of twelve aerospace engineering seniors and one graduate research assistant in the development of a crew seat prototype for space startup Transformational Space Corporation, or t/Space. In 2005, Voss became VP of Space Exploration Systems for t/Space. In November 2007 Voss left t/Space to become the Vice President of Engineering at SpaceDev. After SpaceDev was acquired by Sierra Nevada Corporation he became Sierra Nevada Corporation's director of advanced programs, and then VP of Space Exploration Systems and program executive on the Dream Chaser spaceplane. In August 2009 Voss began teaching as a Scholar in Residence at the University of Colorado Boulder teaching a class on human spaceflight.

He retired from SNC in July 2013 and from teaching at the University of Colorado in May 2025. Voss is a member of the NASA Advisory Council and on the Board of Directors of the National Space Biomedical Research Institute.

== Awards and decorations ==
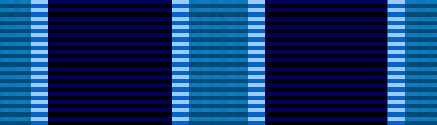
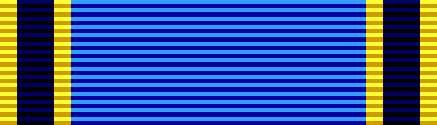
Army Distinguished Service Medal
Defense Superior Service Medal
Defense Meritorious Service Medal
Meritorious Service Medal
Army Commendation Medal
NASA Distinguished Service Medal
NASA Outstanding Leadership Medal
NASA Exceptional Service Medal
NASA Space Flight Medal with four oak leaf clusters
National Defense Service Medal
Army Service Ribbon

Voss has also been awarded:

- University of Colorado Distinguished Engineering Alumni Award (2002)
- Alabama Engineering Hall of Fame (2001)
- Russian Spaceflight Medal of Achievement
- American Institute of Aeronautics and Astronautics Associate Fellow
- Auburn University Distinguished Auburn Engineer
- Most Outstanding Faculty Member, Aerospace Engineering Dept, Auburn University
- University of Colorado Distinguished Engineering Alumni Award
- National Aeronautic Association Gagarin Gold Medal
- Alabama Aviation Hall of Fame
