= ODERACS 2 =

ODERACS-2 (Orbital Debris Radar Calibration Sphere 2) was a series of six spheres deployed from the shuttle mission STS-63, ODERACS-2A through -2. The purpose of the Orbital Debris Radar Calibration Sphere experiment was to calibrate the radars and telescopes used for orbital debris measurements by putting passive objects of known size and shape into orbit. The objects were 2, 4, and 6 inch spheres and three wire dipoles.

The ODERACS satellites launched aboard the Space Shuttle Discovery on 4 February 1995, at 04:57 from Kennedy Space Center's Launch Pad 39B alongside Spartan 204-F1. They were placed into a 51.6° orbit.

== Specifications ==
Satellite	COSPAR ID	SATCAT number	Shape
ODERACS-2A	1995-004C	23471	15 cm sphere
ODERACS-2B	1995-004D	23472	10 cm sphere
ODERACS-2C	1995-004E	23473	5 cm sphere
ODERACS-2D	1995-004F	23474	13.3 cm dipole
ODERACS-2E	1995-004G	23475	13.3 cm dipole
ODERACS-2F	1995-004H	23476	4.4 cm dipole
