= Thomas J. Hennen (astronaut) =

American astronaut (born 1952)

Thomas John Hennen
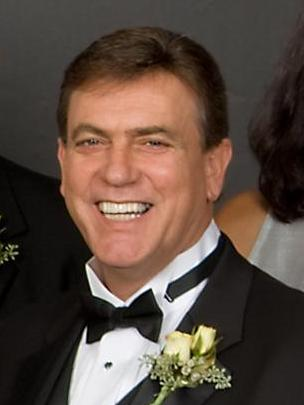
- Hennen in Cleveland August 29, 2008 to celebrate NASA's 50th anniversary.
- Born: 17 August 1952 (age 74); Albany, Georgia, U.S.
- Occupation: Military Intelligence
- Space career

NASA Payload Specialist
- Rank: Chief Warrant Officer 4, USA
- Time in space: 6d 22h 50m
- Missions: STS-44

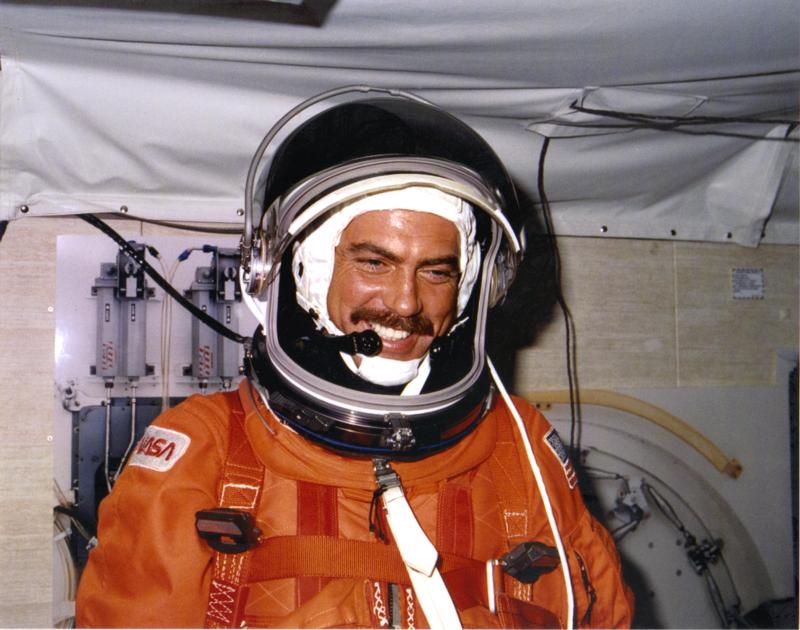
Hennen getting ready to board the Space Shuttle Atlantis for mission STS-44, 1991.

Chief Warrant Officer 4 Thomas John Hennen (born August 17, 1952) is a United States Army warrant officer and NASA payload specialist astronaut who flew aboard Space Shuttle mission STS-44 as a payload specialist.

== Personal ==
Hennen was born on August 17, 1952, in Albany, Georgia. As an Air Force dependent, he was literally raised all over the world. He now lives in Houston, Texas. He is married to the former Sherri Wise of Houston. Together, they have six children: Kristopher, Jessie, Karl, Kyle, Kendall, and Karli, as well as 8 grandchildren: Mila, Hunter, Elijah, Christian, Isaiah, Jasaiah, West and Kennedy. His father, Chief Master Sergeant Carl H. Hennen (USAF) and his mother, Antoinette L. (Ferrera) Hennen are both deceased.

== Education ==
Hennen graduated from Groveport-Madison High School in Groveport, Ohio in 1970. He attended Urbana College in Urbana, Ohio from 1970–1972 on both an academic and athletic scholarship.

== Military career ==
Mr. Hennen was the first Warrant Officer within the U.S. Army and Department of Defense to have been selected as a member of a NASA Space Shuttle flight crew.

Tom entered the U.S. Army in 1972 and served over 23 years in the Imagery Intelligence (IMINT)field. During his career, he received extensive technical training and experience as an operational imagery analyst at both the tactical and national intelligence levels. His experience as an instructor, training, force, and combat developer and his extensive material development and acquisition management experience combined to make him one of the most qualified IMINT technicians within the Department of Defense (DoD).

From 1973 to 1975, he was assigned to the 163rd Military Intelligence Battalion, Fort Hood, Texas. During this assignment he participated in the planning, development, and conduct of major operational and force development tests and evaluations in direct support of U.S. Army and III Corps combat requirements. A small sample of these tests included: the evaluation of the effectiveness of various firing methodologies of the AH-1 Cobra attack helicopter; the testing and evaluation of new camouflage netting, uniforms, and painted vehicles now in use throughout the Army; the initial U.S. Army Remotely piloted vehicle testing; phosphorus smoke tests; antenna mast tests; and heat loss/energy conservation tests.

During 1976 through 1978, Hennen was assigned to the 203rd Military Intelligence Detachment. While there he served as Operations NCO and the Chief of both the Tactical and Strategic Exploitation Divisions, which provided imagery collection, exploitation, and intelligence support to the 1st Cavalry Division, the 2nd Armored Division, the 6th Armored Cavalry Regiment, and Headquarters III Corps.

From 1978 to 1981, Mr. Hennen was assigned to 497th Reconnaissance Technical Group in Schierstein, Germany. This assignment was in direct support to the office of the Deputy Chief of Staff for Intelligence, Headquarters United States Air Forces in Europe. As a senior imagery analyst, the information derived from Mister Hennen's analysis altered and enhanced intelligence estimates and updated the enemy threat assessment against Western European and North Atlantic Treaty Organization forces, which proved critical to the continued mission effectiveness of the United States Air Forces in Europe, the United States Army Europe, and the United States European Command.

Hennen was assigned to the U.S. Army Intelligence Center, Fort Huachuca, Arizona, from 1981 through 1986. He was the project officer for the Imagery Intelligence (IMINT) Tactical Exploitation of National Space Capabilities Program (TENCAP), responsible for developing all training requirements, concepts and doctrine. His efforts culminated in the production of multimillion-dollar training programs which in turn supported the fielding of a variety of new systems operating at both the tactical and national intelligence levels. During this assignment, Hennen was appointed as the Department of the Army IMINT subject matter expert (SME). He developed and managed major projects for the Office of the Secretary of Defense; authored the U.S. Army Imagey Intelligence Radar Training Plan; participated in the development of the TENCAP Systems Management Model; was selected as a member of a Defense Intelligence Agency (DIA) team that developed the Joint Space Intelligence and Operations Course; and he represented the U.S. Army on the DIA Intelligence Training Equipment Subcommittee.

In 1986, Hennen was selected by the Commanding General of the U.S. Army Intelligence Center to represent him within the U.S. Army Space Program Office (ASPO) in Washington, D.C. for those matters pertaining to TENCAP requirements, concept development, and the doctrinal and operational employment of TENCAP systems. Additionally, he participated in various Army, DOD, and National Intelligence Community working groups and subcommittees involved in TENCAP program activities. Hennen was personally responsible for managing the development and successful fielding of state-of-the-art IMINT systems to both the European and Pacific theaters of operations. Chief Hennen's efforts at ASPO were instrumental in the efficient evolution of five major TENCAP systems with a Life Cycle Cost in excess of 2 billion US dollars. These systems continue to provide critical and timely intelligence in support of the requirements of the tactical commander on the extended battlefield.

== Astronaut career ==
Hennen was selected as a Payload Specialist candidate in September 1988 and moved back to the "Home of Military Intelligence", Fort Huachuca, Arizona, during March 1989 to begin Terra Scout payload operations training. During August 1989 he was selected as the primary Payload Specialist for the Terra Scout experiment manifested on STS-44 and he reported to NASA in 1990 to begin NASA Payload Specialist and Space Shuttle Crew Training.

Hennen became the first warrant officer in space, flying aboard the Space Shuttle Atlantis (STS-44), which launched from Kennedy Space Center Pad 39A at 6:44 PM (EST), November 24, 1991. He orbited the Earth 109 times, traveling 2.9 million miles (4.7 million km), before landing at Edwards Air Force Base, California on December 1, 1991.

Hennen retired from the U.S. Army in December 1995. In 1996 he co-founded and served as the Executive Director of the Atlantis Foundation until 2017. The Atlantis Foundation was a non-profit organization that was both an advocate and a service provider for persons with developmental disabilities.

== Awards and honors ==
Mr. Hennen's Awards and Honors include: Defense Superior Service Medal, Legion of Merit, Meritorious Service Medal with two oak leaf clusters, Army Commendation Medal, Army Achievement Medal with oak leaf cluster, NASA Space Flight Medal, Army Good Conduct Medal, National Defense Service Medal, Armed Forces Space and Missile Badge (Senior Level), Army Aviation Badge with Astronaut Device and the Air Force Outstanding Unit Award with oak leaf cluster. Mr. Hennen also received the U.S. Army Military Intelligence Corps Knowlton Award.

Hennen was selected on numerous occasions as Soldier and Non-Commissioned Officer (NCO) of the Quarter/Year by the various commands and agencies to which he was assigned during his enlisted career.

CW4(R) Hennen was inducted into the U.S. Army Military Intelligence Hall of Fame on June 24, 2022.
