= STS-53 =

1992 American crewed spaceflight for the Department of Defense

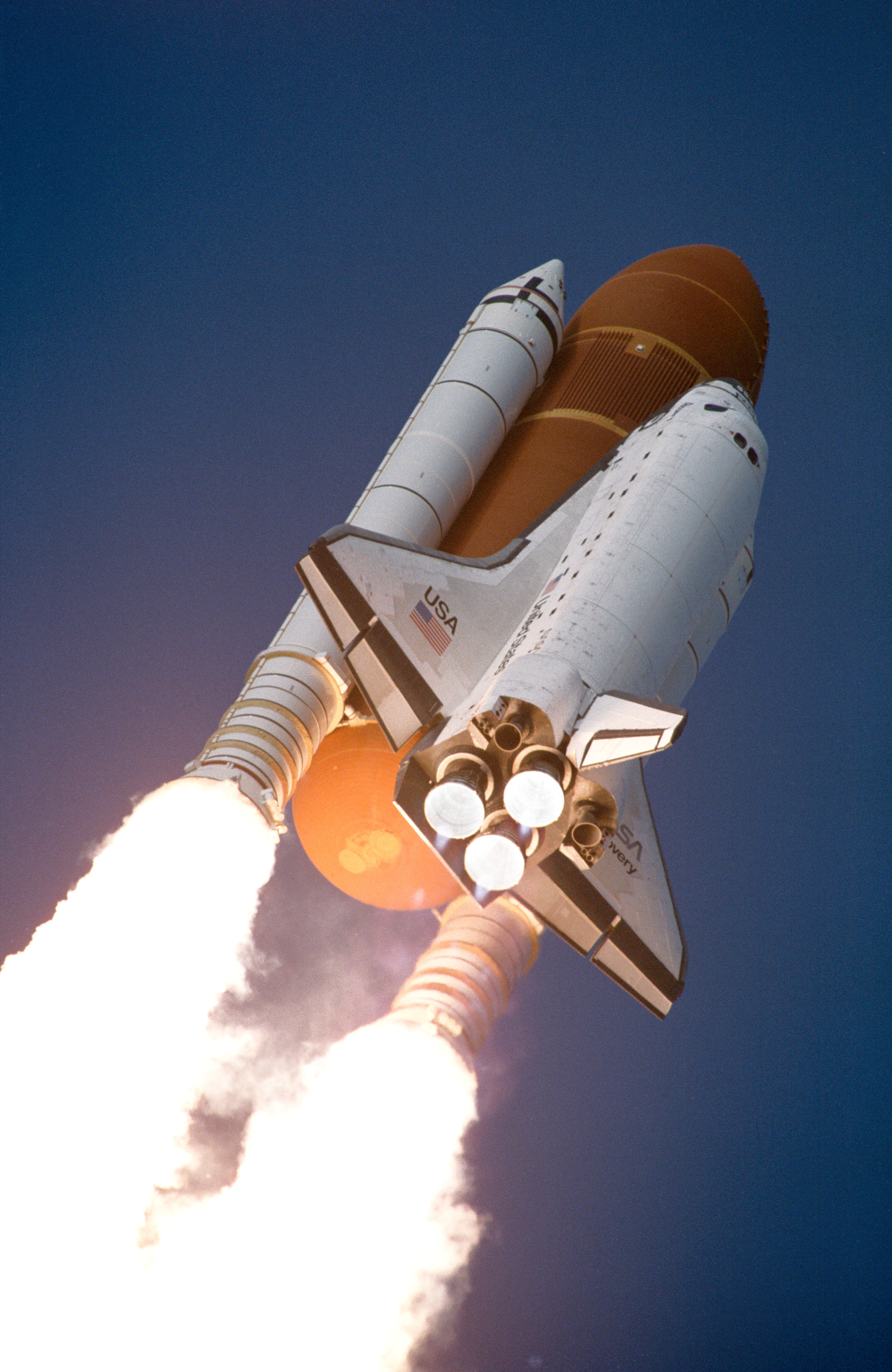
- Launch of Discovery for a Department of Defense (DoD) mission
- Names: Space Transportation System-53
- Mission type: DoD satellite deployment
- Operator: NASA
- COSPAR ID: 1992-086A
- SATCAT no.: 22259
- Mission duration: 7 days, 7 hours, 19 minutes, 17 seconds
- Distance travelled: 4,883,840 km (3,034,680 mi)
- Orbits completed: 116

Spacecraft properties
- Spacecraft: Space Shuttle Discovery
- Launch mass: 110,655 kg (243,953 lb)
- Landing mass: 87,565 kg (193,048 lb)
- Payload mass: 11,860 kg (26,150 lb)

Crew
- Crew size: 5
- Members: David M. Walker; Robert D. Cabana; Guion Bluford; Michael R. Clifford; James S. Voss

Start of mission
- Launch date: December 2, 1992, 13:24:00 UTC (8:24 am EST)
- Launch site: Kennedy, LC-39A
- Contractor: Rockwell International

End of mission
- Landing date: December 9, 1992, 20:43:17 UTC (12:43:47 pm PST)
- Landing site: Edwards, Runway 22

Orbital parameters
- Reference system: Geocentric orbit
- Regime: Low Earth orbit
- Perigee altitude: 365 km (227 mi)
- Apogee altitude: 376 km (234 mi)
- Inclination: 57.00°
- Period: 92.00 minutes

Instruments
- Battlefield Laser Acquisition Sensor Test (BLAST); Cloud Logic to Optimize Use of Defense Systems (CLOUDS); Cosmic Radiation Effects and Activation Monitor (CREAM); Fluid Acquisition and Resupply Experiment (FARE); Get Away Special (GAS); Shuttle Glow Experiment/Cryogenic Heat Pipe Experiment (GCP); Hand-held, Earth-oriented, Real-time, Cooperative, User-friendly, Location-targeting and Environmental System (HERCULES); Microcapsules in Space (MIS-l); Radiation Monitoring Equipment (RME-III); Space Tissue Loss (STL); Visual Function Tester (VFT-2)
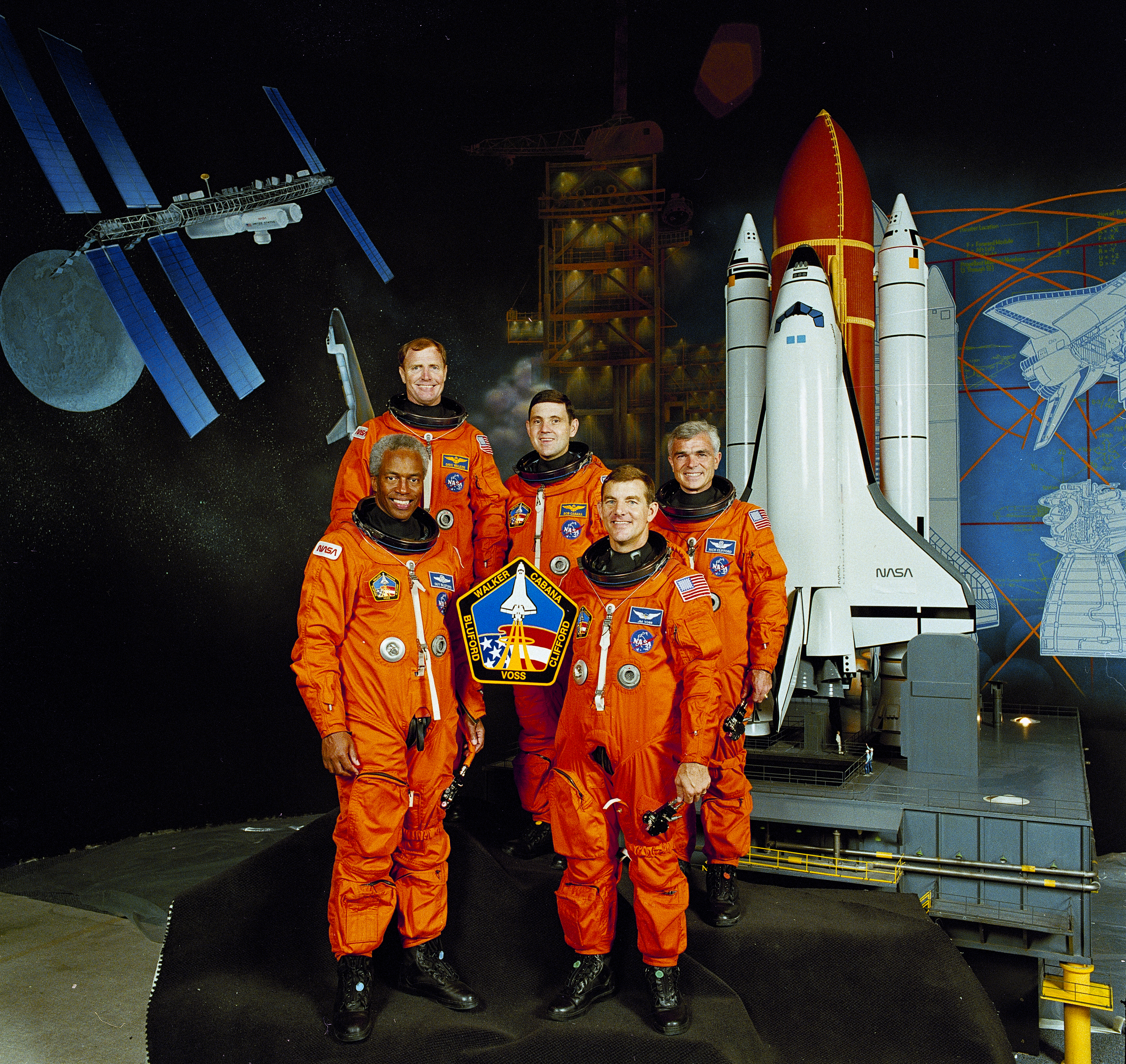
- STS-53 mission patch Back: Walker, Cabana and Clifford; Front: Bluford and Voss Space Shuttle program

STS-53 was a NASA Space Shuttle Discovery mission in support of the United States Department of Defense (DoD). It was Discovery's 15th flight. The mission was launched on December 2, 1992, from Kennedy Space Center, Florida. This was also the last mission to have been operated via MCR-2 in JSC. Afterwards the room was restored entirely to its Apollo era appearance.

== Crew ==
Position	Astronaut
Commander	David M. Walker; Third spaceflight
Pilot	Robert D. Cabana; Second spaceflight
Mission Specialist 1	Guion Bluford; Fourth and last spaceflight
Mission Specialist 2 Flight Engineer	James S. Voss; Second spaceflight
Mission Specialist 3	Michael R. Clifford; First spaceflight

=== Crew seat assignments ===
Seat	Launch	Landing	Seats 1–4 are on the flight deck. Seats 5–7 are on the mid-deck.
1	Walker		Seats 1–4 are on the flight deck. Seats 5–7 are on the mid-deck.
2	Cabana		Seats 1–4 are on the flight deck. Seats 5–7 are on the mid-deck.
3	Bluford	Clifford	Seats 1–4 are on the flight deck. Seats 5–7 are on the mid-deck.
4	Voss		Seats 1–4 are on the flight deck. Seats 5–7 are on the mid-deck.
5	Clifford	Bluford	Seats 1–4 are on the flight deck. Seats 5–7 are on the mid-deck.
6	Unused		Seats 1–4 are on the flight deck. Seats 5–7 are on the mid-deck.
7	Unused		Seats 1–4 are on the flight deck. Seats 5–7 are on the mid-deck.

== Mission highlights ==
Discovery carried a classified primary payload (DOD-1) for the United States Department of Defense (DoD), two unclassified secondary payloads and nine unclassified middeck experiments.

Discovery's primary payload, USA-89 (1992-086B) is also known as "DoD-1", and was the shuttle's last major payload for the Department of Defense. The satellite was the third launch of a Satellite Data System-2 (SDS 2-3) military communications satellite, after USA-40 on STS-28 and STS-38's deployment of USA-67.

Secondary payloads contained in or attached to Get Away Special (GAS) hardware in the cargo bay included the Orbital Debris Radar Calibration Spheres (ODERACS) satellites and the combined Shuttle Glow Experiment/Cryogenic Heat Pipe Experiment (GCP).

Middeck experiments included Microcapsules in Space (MIS-l); Space Tissue Loss (STL); Visual Function Tester (VFT-2); Cosmic Radiation Effects and Activation Monitor (CREAM); Radiation Monitoring Equipment (RME-III); Fluid Acquisition and Resupply Experiment (FARE); Hand-held, Earth-oriented, Real-time, Cooperative, User-friendly, Location-targeting and Environmental System (HERCULES); Battlefield Laser Acquisition Sensor Test (BLAST); and the Cloud Logic to Optimize Use of Defense Systems (CLOUDS).

== Mission insignia ==
The five sides represent the Pentagon, the Department of Defense headquarters. The five stars and three stripes of the insignia symbolize the flight's numerical designation in the Space Transportation System's mission sequence.

== See also ==
- List of human spaceflights
- List of Space Shuttle missions
- Militarization of space
- Nikon NASA F4
- Outline of space science
