= Payload specialist =

Person trained for flights of a specific payload on a crewed spacecraft mission

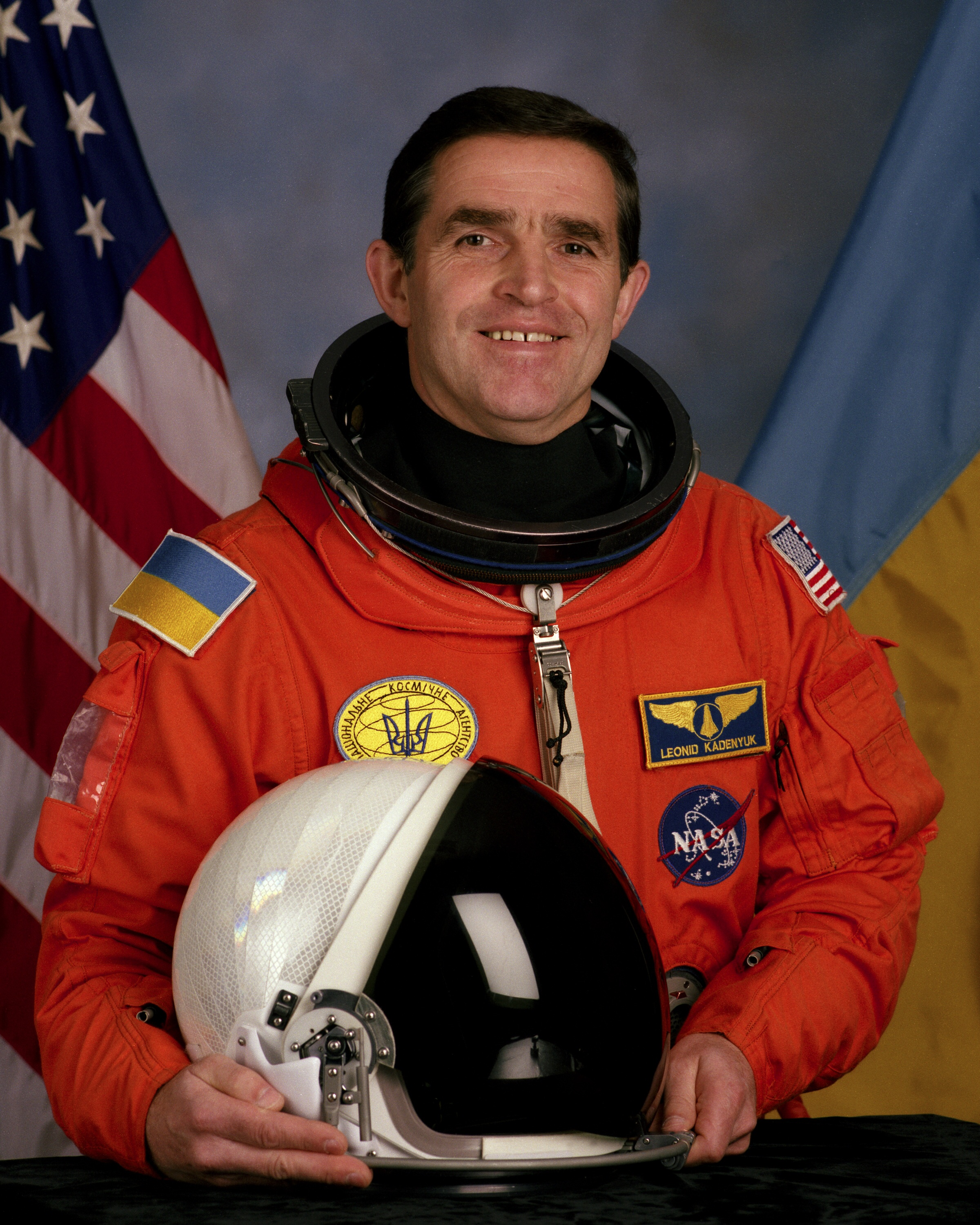
Ukrainian astronaut Leonid Kadenyuk seen with a badge of payload specialist on the left side of his chest

A payload specialist (PS) is an individual selected and trained by commercial or research organizations for flights of a specific payload on a crewed spacecraft mission. People assigned as payload specialists included individuals selected by the research community, a company or consortium flying a commercial payload aboard the spacecraft, and non-NASA astronauts designated by international partners.

The term refers to both the individual and to the position on the Shuttle crew.

== History ==
The National Aeronautics and Space Act of 1958 states that NASA should provide the "widest practicable and appropriate dissemination of information concerning its activities and the results thereof". The Naugle panel of 1982 concluded that carrying civilians—those not part of the NASA Astronaut Corps—on the Space Shuttle was part of "the purpose of adding to the public's understanding of space flight".

Payload specialists usually fly for a single specific mission. Chosen outside the standard NASA mission specialist selection process, they are exempt from certain NASA requirements such as colorblindness. Roger K. Crouch and Ulf Merbold are examples of those who flew in space despite not meeting NASA physical requirements; the agency's director of crew training Jim Bilodeau said in April 1981 "we'll be able to take everybody but the walking wounded". Payload specialists were not required to be United States citizens, but had to be approved by NASA and undergo rigorous but shorter training. In contrast, a Space Shuttle mission specialist was selected as a NASA astronaut first and then assigned to a mission.

Payload specialists on early missions were technical experts to join specific payloads such as a commercial or scientific satellite. On Spacelab and other missions with science components, payload specialists were scientists with expertise in specific experiments. The term also applied to representatives from partner nations who were given the opportunity of a first flight on board of the Space Shuttle (such as Saudi Arabia and Mexico), to Congressmen and the Teacher in Space program. Under Secretary of the Air Force Edward C. Aldridge Jr. was offered a seat to improve relations between NASA and the United States Air Force.

NASA expected to also fly "citizen astronauts", ordinary Americans who could describe space to others. In August 1984 President Ronald Reagan announced the Teacher in Space Project, the first such program. NASA expected to fly reporters (Journalist in Space Project), entertainers, and creative types later.

NASA categorized full-time international astronauts as payload specialists unless they received NASA mission specialist training, which some did. Bilodeau estimated that payload specialists would receive a couple of hundred hours of training over four or five weeks. International or scientific payload specialists were generally assigned a back-up who trained alongside the primary payload specialist and would replace them in the event of illness or other disability. Both primary and backup payload specialists received mission-specific and general training. Michael Lampton estimated that about 20% of his training was general, including firefighter school, capsule communicator duty, and use of Personal Egress Air Packs and the space toilet. He described training for Spacelab 1 as "going back to graduate school but majoring in everything"; as the first mission it tested Spacelab's versatility in "medical, metallurgical, remote sensing, astronomy, microgravity, lots more".

Payload specialists operated experiments, and participated in experiments needing human subjects. Charles D. Walker recalled that Senator Jake Garn "and I were the obvious subjects" for Rhea Seddon's echocardiograph on STS-51-D. "We really didn't have much of a choice in whether we were going to be subjects or not. 'You're a payload specialist; you’re going to be a subject.'" Besides his own electrophoresis work, Walker operated an unrelated experiment for the University of Alabama Birmingham, and helped build homemade repair tools for a satellite launched on the mission.

Payload specialists were flown from 1983 (STS-9) to 2003 (STS-107). The last flown payload specialist was the first Israeli astronaut, Ilan Ramon, who was killed in the Columbia disaster on mission STS-107 with the rest of the crew.

Chinese professor Gui Haichao became the first Chinese payload specialist and the first since the Space Shuttle Columbia disaster, flying on Shenzhou 16.

== Criticism ==
Within NASA, Johnson Space Center (JSC) controlled crewed spaceflight by selecting professional, full-time astronauts. The payload specialist program gave Marshall Space Flight Center (MSFC)—which supervised Spacelab, including a contracted European Space Agency-chosen payload specialist—control as well, causing conflicts. JSC director Chris Kraft and members of the NASA astronaut corps believed that mission specialists—many with doctoral degrees or other scientific background, and all with full-time astronaut training—could operate all experiments. Rick Chappell, chief scientist of MSFC, believed that the scientific community insisted on its own scientists being able to operate experiments in exchange for support of the Space Shuttle program. While mission specialists could operate most experiments, "Since we could take passengers, why not take at least a couple of passengers who had spent their whole careers doing the kind of research they were going to do in space?" he said.

During the Space Shuttle design process, some said that crews should be no larger than four people; both for safety, and because a commander, pilot, mission specialist, and payload specialist were sufficient for any mission. NASA expected to fly more payload specialists so it designed a larger vehicle. Only NASA astronauts piloted the space shuttle, but mission specialist astronauts worried about competing with American and international payload specialists for very limited flight opportunities. In 1984 about 45 mission specialists competed for about 15 seats on the five shuttle flights. Only three payload specialists flew that year, but in 1985 eight of nine shuttle flights carried 15 payload specialists (Walker flying twice), no doubt angering mission specialists. Some payload specialists like Walker and Byron Lichtenberg were rejected as full-time astronauts but flew as payload specialists before many selected as such, and some may have flown without understanding the level of danger. Many astronauts worried that without years of training together they would not be able to trust payload specialists in an emergency; Henry Hartsfield described their concern as "If you had a problem on orbit, am I going to have to babysit this person?" NASA's preference for its own training caused the agency to offer some international payload specialists the opportunity to become mission specialists, the first being Claude Nicollier.

Those skeptical of the payload specialist program were less critical of scientists and experts like Walker than non-expert passengers ("part-timers", according to Mike Mullane, who called the program public relations-driven and immoral in Riding Rockets) like Garn, US Representative Bill Nelson, and other civilians such as Teacher in Space Christa McAuliffe. They saw Senator John Glenn as a passenger despite being a former Mercury Seven astronaut. A 1986 post-Challenger article in The Washington Post reviewed the issue, reporting that as far back as 1982, NASA was concerned with finding reasonable justifications for flying civilians on the Shuttle as was directed by the Reagan administration. The article says that "A review of records and interviews with past and present NASA and government officials shows the civilian program's controversial background, with different groups pushing for different approaches". The article concludes with:

Author Tom Wolfe, who chronicled the early days of the space program in The Right Stuff, wrote after the Challenger explosion that support for the citizen program, and therefore McAuliffe's place aboard the ill-fated shuttle, was part of an insiders' battle. NASA civilians, pitting themselves against the professional astronauts, used the program for the "dismantling of Astropower", which Wolfe described as "the political grip the original breed of fighter-pilot test-pilot astronauts had on NASA."

Payload specialists were aware of full-time astronauts' dislike of the program. Garn advised STS-51-D colleague Jeffrey A. Hoffman to not play poker because, the astronaut quoted, "'It took you a while to disguise your initial skepticism about this whole thing'". Merbold said that at JSC he was treated as an intruder. Once payload specialists were assigned to a mission, however, full-time astronauts treated them respectfully and often began long-term friendships. Mullane became less critical of them after his first mission; he and Hartsfield approved of Walker, as did Hoffman of Garn after STS-51-D.

== List of all payload specialists ==
Payload specialist	Mission	Sponsor
Ulf Merbold	STS-9	European Space Agency
Byron K. Lichtenberg	STS-9	Massachusetts Institute of Technology
Charles D. Walker	STS-41-D	McDonnell Douglas
Marc Garneau	STS-41-G	Canadian Space Agency
Paul Scully-Power	STS-41-G	United States Navy
Gary Payton	STS-51-C	Manned Spaceflight Engineer Program
Charles D. Walker	STS-51-D	McDonnell Douglas
Jake Garn	STS-51-D	United States Congress
Lodewijk van den Berg	STS-51-B	EG&G
Taylor Wang	STS-51-B	Jet Propulsion Laboratory
Patrick Baudry	STS-51-G	CNES (France)
Sultan bin Salman Al Saud	STS-51-G	Royal Saudi Air Force
Loren Acton	STS-51-F	Lockheed
John-David F. Bartoe	STS-51-F	United States Navy
William A. Pailes	STS-51-J	Manned Spaceflight Engineer Program
Reinhard Furrer	STS-61-A	German Aerospace Center
Ernst Messerschmid	STS-61-A	German Aerospace Center
Wubbo Ockels	STS-61-A	European Space Agency
Rodolfo Neri Vela	STS-61-B	Secretariat of Communications and Transportation (Mexico)
Charles D. Walker	STS-61-B	McDonnell Douglas
Robert J. Cenker	STS-61-C	RCA
Bill Nelson	STS-61-C	United States Congress
Gregory Jarvis	STS-51-L	Hughes Space and Communications
Christa McAuliffe	STS-51-L	Teacher in Space Project
Samuel T. Durrance	STS-35	Johns Hopkins University
Ronald A. Parise	STS-35	Computer Sciences Corporation
F. Drew Gaffney	STS-40	NASA
Millie Hughes-Fulford	STS-40	United States Department of Veterans Affairs
Thomas J. Hennen	STS-44	United States Army
Roberta Bondar	STS-42	Canadian Space Agency
Ulf Merbold	STS-42	European Space Agency
Byron K. Lichtenberg	STS-45	Massachusetts Institute of Technology
Dirk Frimout	STS-45	European Space Agency
Lawrence J. DeLucas	STS-50	University of Alabama at Birmingham
Eugene H. Trinh	STS-50	Jet Propulsion Laboratory
Franco Malerba	STS-46	Italian Space Agency
Mamoru Mohri	STS-47	National Space Development Agency of Japan
Steve MacLean	STS-52	Canadian Space Agency
Ulrich Walter	STS-55	German Aerospace Center
Hans Schlegel	STS-55	German Aerospace Center
Martin J. Fettman	STS-58	Colorado State University
Chiaki Mukai	STS-65	National Space Development Agency of Japan
Samuel T. Durrance	STS-67	Johns Hopkins University
Ronald A. Parise	STS-67	Computer Sciences Corporation
Frederick W. Leslie	STS-73	Marshall Space Flight Center
Albert Sacco	STS-73	Worcester Polytechnic Institute
Umberto Guidoni	STS-75	Italian Space Agency
Jean-Jacques Favier	STS-78	CNES (France)
Robert Thirsk	STS-78	Canadian Space Agency
Roger K. Crouch	STS-83	Massachusetts Institute of Technology
Gregory T. Linteris	STS-83	National Institute of Standards and Technology
Roger K. Crouch	STS-94	Massachusetts Institute of Technology
Gregory T. Linteris	STS-94	National Institute of Standards and Technology
Bjarni Tryggvason	STS-85	Canadian Space Agency
Leonid Kadeniuk	STS-87	State Space Agency of Ukraine
Jay C. Buckey	STS-90	Dartmouth College
James A. Pawelczyk	STS-90	Pennsylvania State University
Chiaki Mukai	STS-95	National Space Development Agency of Japan
John Glenn	STS-95	United States Congress
Ilan Ramon	STS-107	Israel Space Agency
Gui Haichao	Shenzhou 16	China Manned Space Agency
Zhang Hongzhang	Shenzhou 21/22	China Manned Space Agency
Lai Ka-ying	Shenzhou 23	China Manned Space Agency

== Backup payload specialists ==
The following list are people who were named as backup (also known as alternate) payload specialists. These people typically received the same training as the "prime" crew payload specialist, but did not fly on the mission. However, many would go on to fly on other missions as "prime" crew payload or mission specialists.

Payload specialist	Mission	Notes
Wubbo Ockels	STS-9	flew on STS-61-A
Michael Lampton	STS-9	
Robert Thirsk	STS-41-G	flew on STS-78
Robert E. Stevenson	STS-41-G	
Keith Wright	STS-51-C	
Mary Johnston	STS-51-B	
Eugene H. Trinh	STS-51-B	flew on STS-50
Jean-Loup Chrétien	STS-51-G	flew on STS-86 as a mission specialist
Abdulmohsen Al-Bassam	STS-51-G	
George W. Simon	STS-51-F	
Dianne K. Prinz	STS-51-F	
Ulf Merbold	STS-61-A	flew on STS-9, STS-42
Barbara Morgan	STS-51-L	flew on STS-118 as a mission specialist
Robert W. Phillips	STS-40	
Michael Lampton	STS-45	
Charles R. Chappell	STS-45	
Joseph M. Prahl	STS-50	
Albert Sacco	STS-50	flew on STS-73
Jean-Jacques Favier	STS-65	flew on STS-78
David H. Matthiesen	STS-73	
R. Glynn Holt	STS-73	
Pedro Duque	STS-78	flew on STS-95 as a mission specialist
Luca Urbani	STS-78	
Alan Johnston	STS-83	
Paul Ronney	STS-83	
Alan Johnston	STS-94	
Paul Ronney	STS-94	
Yaroslav Pustovyi	STS-87	
Alexander W. Dunlap	STS-90	
Chiaki Mukai	STS-90	flew on STS-65, STS-95

== Other statistics ==
=== Multiple flights ===
Flights	Payload specialist
3	Charles Walker
2	Ulf Merbold, Byron K. Lichtenberg, Samuel T. Durrance, Ronald A. Parise, Chiaki Mukai, Roger Crouch, Greg Linteris

=== Nationalities ===
Flights	Country
36	United States
6	Germany (Note: West Germany until 1990.)
5	Canada
3	Japan
2	France
2	Italy
2	China
1	Saudi Arabia
1	Netherlands
1	Mexico
1	Belgium
1	Ukraine
1	Israel
1	Hong Kong

=== Payload specialists who later trained as mission specialists ===
All were international astronauts.

- Marc Garneau – mission specialist on STS-77, STS-97
- Mamoru Mohri – mission specialist on STS-99
- Steven MacLean – mission specialist on STS-115
- Hans Schlegel – mission specialist on STS-122
- Umberto Guidoni – mission specialist on STS-100
- Robert Thirsk – flight engineer on Soyuz TMA-15 and Expedition 20
- Bjarni Tryggvason – completed training, retired in June 2008 without flying again

== See also ==
- List of human spaceflights
