= Michael Lampton =

American astronaut (1941–2023)

Michael L. Lampton
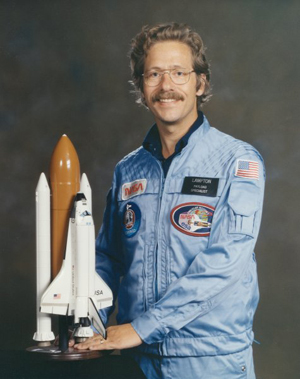
- Born: March 1, 1941; Williamsport, Pennsylvania, U.S.
- Died: June 9, 2023 (aged 82); Oakland, California, U.S.
- Occupations: Physicist, Space Sciences Laboratory
- Space career

UC Berkeley Payload Specialist
- Missions: STS-9, STS-45

Michael Logan Lampton (March 1, 1941 – June 9, 2023) was an American astronaut, scientist, and founder of the optical ray tracing company Stellar Software. He was also known for his paper on electroacoustics with Susan M Lea, The theory of maximally flat loudspeaker systems.

== Personal life ==
Michael Logan Lampton was born March 1, 1941, in Williamsport, Pennsylvania. In 1961, while Lampton was attending Caltech he was one of the "Fiendish Fourteen", 14 students responsible for the Great Rose Bowl Hoax. He was married to San Francisco State University graduate professor and theoretical astrophysicist, Susan M. Lea. They had one daughter, Jennifer Lea Lampton.

Michael Lampton died in Oakland, California, on June 9, 2023, at the age of 82.

== Education ==
- Bachelor of Science degree in Physics from Caltech, 1962
- Ph.D. in Physics from the University of California-Berkeley, 1967

== SuperNova Acceleration Probe (SNAP) Project ==
Lampton was heavily involved with the SNAP project. SNAP, the Supernova/Acceleration Probe, was to study exploding stars called supernovae, as well as the gentle smearing of the light from distant galaxies due to gravity — called weak gravitational lensing — and put limits on what may or may not be the force driving the outward pull on the Universe. SNAP was to investigate over one thousand square degrees of sky with a 500 megapixel camera.

SNAP was part of the Joint Dark Energy Mission (JDEM), a cooperative venture between NASA and the U.S. Department of Energy. SNAP collaborators John Mather and George Smoot were awarded the 2006 Nobel prize in physics. The SNAP was superseded by the Wide Field InfraRed Survey Telescope (WFIRST)., and now the Nancy Grace Roman Space Telescope – or Roman Space Telescope, – a NASA observatory designed to settle essential questions in the areas of dark energy, exoplanets, and infrared astrophysics. The telescope was initially developed as the WFIRST, and renamed in 2020 to honor Nancy Grace Roman, NASA's first Chief of Astronomy. Roman has been called the “mother” of NASA's Hubble Space Telescope.

== Dark Energy Spectroscopic Instrument (DESI) Project ==
Lampton was heavily involved with the Dark Energy Spectroscopic Instrument project.

The Dark Energy Spectroscopic Instrument (DESI) will measure the effect of dark energy on the expansion of the universe. It will obtain optical spectra for tens of millions of galaxies and quasars, constructing a 3D map spanning the nearby universe to 11 billion light years.

== Extreme Ultraviolet Explorer (EUVE) Project ==
Lampton was heavily involved with the Extreme Ultraviolet Explorer project.

The Extreme Ultraviolet Explorer, a NASA explorer class satellite mission, was launched on June 7, 1992 and it operated till January 31, 2001. EUVE is entirely dedicated to observations in the wavelength range from 70 to 760 Å. The first phase of the mission (six months) was dedicated to an all-sky survey using the imaging instruments. The second phase instead is dedicated to pointed observations with mainly the spectroscopic instruments.

== Far Ultraviolet Spectrosopic Explorer (FUSE) Project ==
Lampton was heavily involved with the Far Ultraviolet Spectroscopic Explorer project.

The Far Ultraviolet Space Telescope is a compact, wide field-of-view, far ultraviolet instrument designed for observations of extended and point sources of astronomical interest. It was originally used in sounding rocket work by both French and American investigators. The instrument was modified for flight on the space shuttle and flew on the Spacelab 1 mission as a joint effort between the Laboratoire d'Astronomie Spatiale and the University of California, Berkeley Space Sciences Laboratory. The prime experiment objective of this telescope is to observe faint astronomical sources in the far ultraviolet with sensitivities far higher than previously available. The experiment will cover the 1300 to 1800 A band, which is inaccessible to observers on earth. The observing program during the mission consists of obtaining deep sky images during spacecraft nighttime. The targets will include hot stars and nebulae in our own galaxy, faint diffuse galactic features similar to the cirrus clouds seen by the Infrared Astronomical Satellite (IRAS), large nearby galaxies, nearby clusters of galaxies, and objects of cosmological interest such as quasars and the diffuse far ultraviolet background.

== Fire Urgency Estimator in Geostationary Orbit (FUEGO) Project ==
Lampton participated in the Fire urgency estimator in geosynchronous orbit (FUEGO) project.

The FUEGO mission is a proposed project by the University of Berkeley. Its stated aim is to continuously observe a large area of the Earth (primarily the western US) to identify the ignition of wildfires and to track their development, to provide agencies and fire fighters on the ground with real-time fire detection. In 2021, the FUEGO mission received $1.5 million in funding from the Gordon and Betty Moore Foundation to run preliminary tests using planes, with the goal of launching a satellite after 4 years.

== NASA Astronaut Program ==
Lampton was a NASA payload specialist from 1978 to 1992. Below is a list of the missions he was a part of.

Year	Mission	Position
1983	STS-9/Columbia	selected and served as backup payload specialist
1985	STS-51-H/Spacelab EOM 1 mission	selected as payload specialist (mission cancelled after the technical problems)
1986	STS-61-K/Spacelab EOM 1-2 mission	selected as payload specialist (mission cancelled after the Challenger accident)
1989	STS-45/ATLAS-1	selected as payload specialist (the same mission as STS-61K—but renamed), replaced by backup payload specialist Dirk Frimout due to medical problems
