= Chi Epsilon Pi =

American meteorological honor society

- ΧΕΠ
- Founded: 1951; 75 years ago University of California, Los Angeles
- Type: Honor
- Affiliation: Independent
- Status: Active
- Emphasis: Atmospheric sciences
- Scope: National
- Colors: Royal blue and Silver
- Chapters: 13
- Headquarters: 405 Hilgard Avenue; 7127 Math Sciences Building; Los Angeles, California 90095-1565; United States
- Website: xep.atmos.ucla.edu

Chi Epsilon Pi (ΧΕΠ) (Also known as XEP) is an American honor society for outstanding students in the field of meteorology/atmospheric sciences. It was established at the University of California, Los Angeles in 1951. It has chartered 13 chapters at various institutions in the United States.

== History ==
Chi Epsilon Pi was founded at Department of Atmospheric and Oceanic Sciences of University of California, Los Angeles in 1951. It is an honor society for students in the field of atmospheric sciences. It promotes the advanced study of meteorology and related field and recognizes students who demonstrate a "promise of achievement: as professionals in the field.

The UCLA chapter was originally formed to recognize graduate students but began also honorary undergraduates in 2019. The local society became national in 1963 with the chartering of its second chapter at Texas A&M University.

Its national office is housed at 405 Hilgard Avenue, 7127 Math Sciences Building in Los Angeles, California.

== Symbols ==
The name Chi Epsilon Pi {ΧΕΠ} was selected to represent ΧΕΙΜΩΝΑΣ ΕΗΙΟΝΤΑΣ ΠΡΟΛΕΓΟΜΕΝ or "Past Events Cast Their Shadows Before Them." The society's colors royal blue and silver.

== Membership ==
Chi Epsilon Pi has active, alumni, and honorary members. Active members include students who have completed ten credits toward a meteorology major with a 3.0 cumulative GPA. However, chapters may set higher standards. Alumni have either graduated, transferred to another institution, or changed majors. Honorary membership are presented to individuals who have completed advanced study of meteorology and receive a majority vote of active chapter membership.

== Chapters ==
Charter date and range	Institution	Location	Status	Ref.
1951	University of California, Los Angeles	Los Angeles, California	Active	
1963	Texas A&M University	College Station, Texas	Active	
1966	Florida State University	Tallahassee, Florida	Active	
Spring 1999	Valparaiso University	Valparaiso, Indiana	Active	
2004	Embry-Riddle Aeronautical University, Daytona Beach	Daytona Beach, Florida	Active	
2005	University of Miami	Coral Gables, Florida	Active	
April 2007	University of Missouri	Columbia, Missouri	Active	
April 2008	University of North Carolina at Charlotte	Charlotte, North Carolina	Inactive	
September 2016	Florida International University	University Park, Florida	Active	
April 2019	Virginia Tech	Blacksburg, Virginia	Active	
2020	Ohio State University	Columbus, Ohio	Active	
2020	University of Georgia	Athens, Georgia	Active	
	Pennsylvania State University	State College, Pennsylvania	Active	

== Notable members ==
- Elliot Abrams, meteorologist who works for AccuWeather
- Jeffrey Frame (2001), professor at the University of Illinois at Urbana-Champaign and atmospheric scientist for VORTEX2
- Frederick W. Leslie, scientist who flew on the NASA STS-73 Space Shuttle mission as a payload specialist
- David Stensrud, research meteorologist with the National Severe Storms Laboratory and adjunct professor at the University of Oklahoma

== See also ==
- Professional fraternities and sororities
