= Fuego =

Fuego is the Spanish word for "fire". It may also refer to:

== Places ==
- Volcán de Fuego, a stratovolcano in Guatemala
- Tierra del Fuego, an archipelago off the southern tip of South America
- Punta Fuego, a headland in the Philippines

== Music ==
- Fuego (singer) (born 1981; Miguel Duran Jr.), a Dominican American merengue singer-songwriter
- Fuego (XM), a Reggaeton/Hispanic rhythmic music channel on XM Satellite Radio

=== Albums ===
- Fuego (Donald Byrd album), 1960
- Fuego (Kumbia Kings album), 2004
- Fuego (La Secta album), 2008
- Fuego (Menudo album), 1981
- Fuego (Phish album), 2014
- Fuego, 2006 album by Juan Carlos Alvarado
- Fuego, 2019 album by Estopa

=== Songs ===
- "Fuego" (The Cheetah Girls song), 2007
- "Fuego" (Eleni Foureira song), 2018
- "Fuego" (DJ Snake, Sean Paul and Anitta song), 2019
- "Fuego", a 2002 instrumental by Bond from the album Shine
- "Fuego", a 2004 song by Kumbia Kings from their album Fuego
- "Fuego", a 2006 song by Pitbull from his album El Mariel
- "Fuego", a 2014 song by Phish from their album Fuego
- "Fuego", a 2014 song by Viza
- "Fuego", a 2017 song by Álvaro Soler from Mar de colores
- "Fuego", a 2019 song by Cazzu from Error 93
- "Fuego", a 2019 song by Ximena Sariñana from ¿Dónde Bailarán las Niñas?

== Films ==
- Fuego (1969 film), an Argentine sexploitation film
- Fuego (2007 film), an action thriller
- Fuego (2014 film), a Spanish thriller film

== Other uses ==
- Fire urgency estimator in geosynchronous orbit, or FUEGO, an experimental technology to detect wildfires
- Renault Fuego, an automobile produced by Renault from 1980 to 1992
- Fuego (comics), a supervillain from Marvel Comics
- Fuego, a business process management software company acquired by BEA Systems
- Fuego (wrestler) (born 1981), a Mexican professional wrestler
