= Mary Mackay =

Mary Mackay may refer to:

- Mary Mackay (1855–1924), English novelist, known by her pseudonym Marie Corelli
- Mary Mackay (actor) (fl. 1940s–1980s), Irish-Australian actress

== See also ==
- Mary Mackey (born 1945), American novelist, poet, and academic
- Mary Helen Johnston (later Mary Helen McCay, born 1945), American scientist and astronaut
