= Frederick Leslie =

Frederick Leslie may refer to:

- Frederick W. Leslie (born 1951), NASA scientist
- Frederick Hobson Leslie (1855–1892), British actor
