= David Stensrud =

American meteorologist and academic

Dave Stensrud
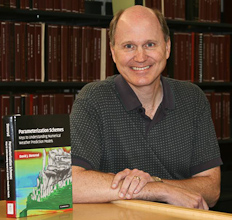
- Education: University of Wisconsin–Madison (B.A.); Pennsylvania State University (M.S., 1985; Ph.D., 1992)
- Awards: Presidential Early Career Award for Scientists and Engineers; NOAA Distinguished Career Award
- Scientific career
- Fields: Meteorology
- Workplaces: National Severe Storms Laboratory
- Thesis: Southward Burst Mesoscale Convective Systems: An Observational and Modeling Study (1992)
- Website: www.nssl.noaa.gov/users/stensrud/public_html/

David Jonathan Stensrud (born 1961) is an American meteorologist recognized for numerical modeling and forecasting of hazardous synoptic and mesoscale weather and for incorporating new data into models.

== Education ==
Stensrud earned a B.A. in meteorology and mathematics at the University of Wisconsin–Madison. At Pennsylvania State University (PSU) he earned M.S. in meteorology in 1985 with the thesis On the Development of Boundary Layer Rolls from the Inflection Point Instability and in 1992 a Ph.D. with the dissertation Southward Burst Mesoscale Convective Systems: An Observational and Modeling Study.

== Career ==
He joined the National Severe Storms Laboratory (NSSL) in 1986 as a research meteorologist and is an adjunct professor at the affiliated University of Oklahoma (OU). He was an inaugural awardee of the Presidential Early Career Award for Scientists and Engineers (PECASE) in 1996 and was a contributor to the Physical Science Basis portion of Fourth Assessment Report of the IPCC, an organisation that was co-awarded the 2007 Nobel Peace Prize. He is a Fellow of the American Meteorological Society (AMS) and a member of Sigma Xi and Chi Epsilon Pi.
