= Albert Sacco =

American astronaut and chemical engineer (born 1949)

Albert Sacco Jr.
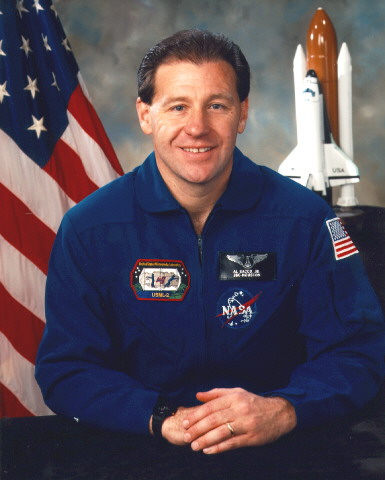
- Born: May 3, 1949 (age 77); Boston, Massachusetts, United States
- Occupation: Professor
- Space career

WPI Payload Specialist
- Time in space: 15d 21h 34m
- Missions: STS-73

Albert Sacco Jr. (born May 3, 1949) is an American chemical engineer who flew as a Payload Specialist on the Space Shuttle Columbia on Shuttle mission STS-73 in 1995. He recently retired as the Provost and Dean of the Franklin W. Olin College of Engineering.

Born in Boston, Massachusetts, Sacco completed a B.S. degree in chemical engineering from Northeastern University in Boston in 1973, and then a Ph.D. degree in chemical engineering from the Massachusetts Institute of Technology in 1977. He then joined the faculty of the Worcester Polytechnic Institute, becoming a full professor and rising to department head in 1989.

Sacco served as the Dean of the Edward E. Whitacre Jr. College of Engineering at Texas Tech University, from January 1, 2011, to August 16, 2022. He has served as the Provost and Dean of the Franklin W. Olin College of Engineering, from August, 2023 onward.

Sacco flew as a payload specialist on STS-73, which launched on October 20, 1995, and landed at the Kennedy Space Center on November 5, 1995.

Sacco was originally chosen as the payload specialist for the ill-fated STS-107 mission, which ended in the Space Shuttle Columbia disaster. He trained with the other six astronauts for two months until NASA and the U.S. government decided to replace him with Israeli payload specialist Ilan Ramon.
