= Elliot Abrams (meteorologist) =

American meteorologist

- Born: May 31, 1947 (age 79); Philadelphia, Pennsylvania, U.S.
- Education: Penn State University
- Occupation: meteorologist

Elliot Abrams (born May 31, 1947) is a meteorologist and native of Philadelphia, Pennsylvania. Abrams has been an employee of AccuWeather since 1967 and is a graduate of the Pennsylvania State University with both a bachelor's (in 1969) and a master's (in 1971) degree in meteorology; he was also a member of the Pi Lambda Phi fraternity. He is a charter member of the Chi Epsilon Pi (national meteorology honor society).

== Career ==
Elliot Abrams, AccuWeather Chief Forecaster and Senior Vice President, is one of only a few living persons who has earned both the title of Certified Consulting Meteorologist and the AMS Seals of Approval for both radio and television from the American Meteorological Society. He is a member of the AMS Board of Certified Consulting Meteorologists (term until 2008), a Fellow of the AMS, and winner of the 1993 AMS award for Outstanding Service by a Broadcasting Meteorologist. In 1996, the National Weather Association named Abrams "Broadcaster of the Year". In 1994, he won the AMS Charles L. Mitchell Award for "outstanding and unique dissemination of weather forecasts to the nation's public by radio and television." On November 20, 2009, Abrams was inducted into the Broadcast Pioneers of Philadelphia's Hall of Fame.

Abrams is co-inventor of the AccuWeather exclusive RealFeel Temperature, which some have criticized for not having any scientific basis. He is a co-author of Meteorology, published by McGraw-Hill as a college text, and Explorations in Meteorology. In late 2010, he wrote the foreword to eXtreme New England Weather written by Josh Judge, a book that profiles events surrounding the various significant storms to have hit New England since the late 1800s.

His regular forecasts and analysis can be heard on many radio stations throughout the United States. On AccuWeather's website, he is billed as "America's Wittiest Weatherman" because of his often humorous radio forecasts, particularly known for high levels of doggerel and puns. On March 1, 2019, Abrams retired from full-time duties at AccuWeather but continues to work for the company on a part-time basis and serves on the American Meteorological Society board.
