= Carolyn S. Griner =

American astronautical engineer (born 1945)

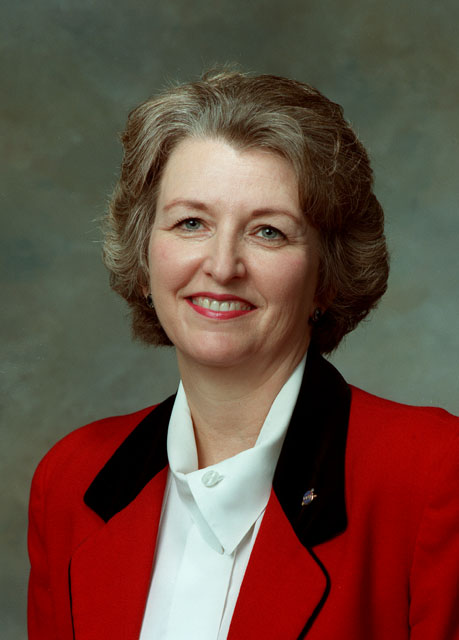
- Official NASA portrait of Carolyn S. Griner (1999)
- Born: 1945 (age 79–80); Granite City, Illinois
- Education: Bachelor’s degree in astronautical engineering at Florida State University, graduate work in industrial and systems engineering at University of Alabama in Huntsville
- Occupation(s): Vice President; Science Applications International Corporation

Carolyn S. Griner (born 1945) is an American astronautical engineer. She served as the Acting Director of the NASA Marshall Space Flight Center from January 3, 1998 to September 11, 1998, between the terms of the eighth and ninth Directors. Before and after her term as Acting Director, she was Deputy Director of the Marshall Center. She retired from NASA on December 11, 2000. She is currently a Vice President of Science Applications International Corporation in Huntsville, Alabama.

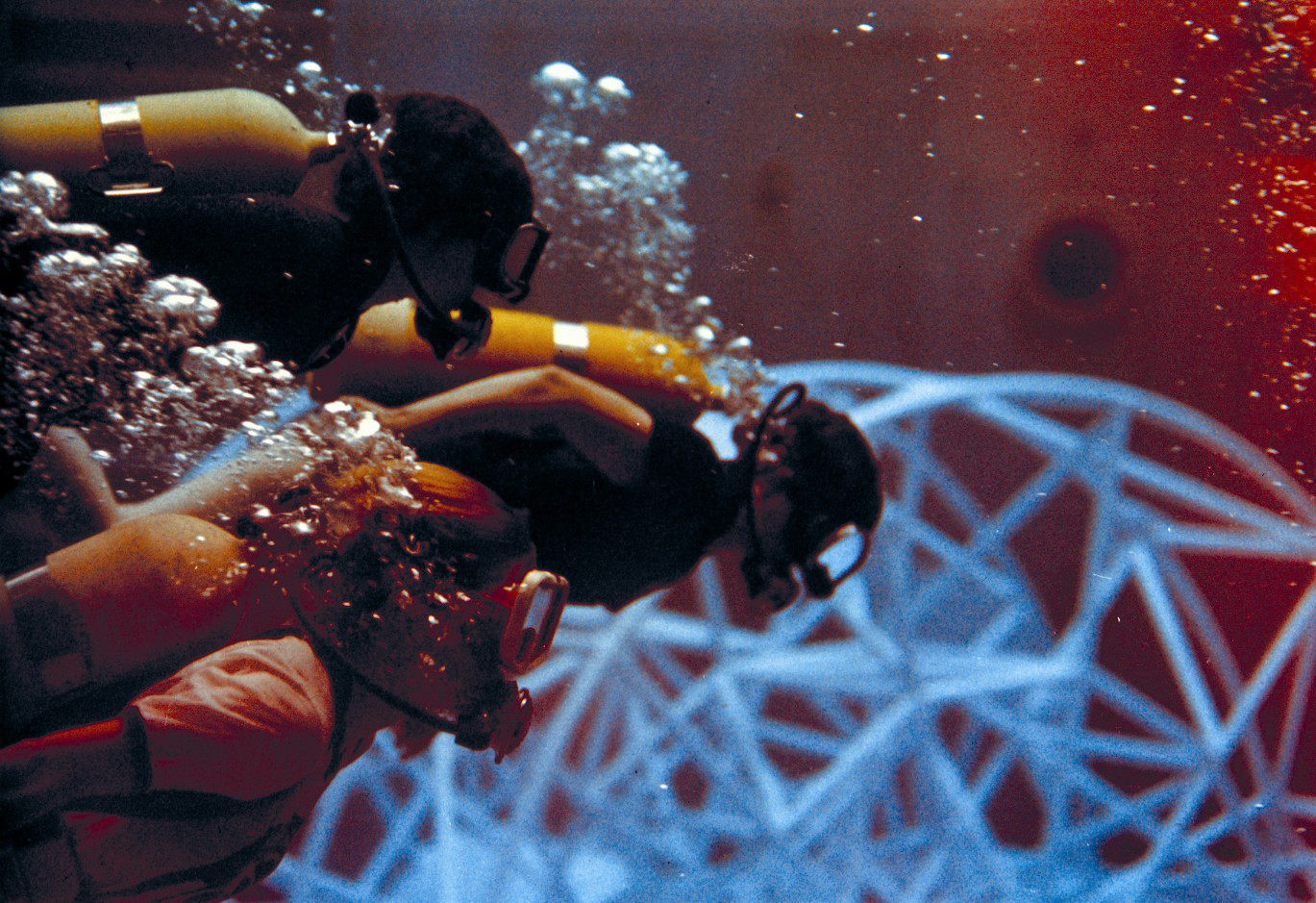
Women scientists in training, (top to bottom) Carolyn Griner, Ann Whitaker, and Dr. Mary Helen Johnston, are shown simulating weightlessness while undergoing training in the Neutral Buoyancy Simulator at Marshall Space Flight Center in 1975.

Griner joined the Marshall staff in 1964. She has received numerous awards throughout her career, including the NASA Exceptional Service Medal in 1986, the Presidential Rank of Meritorious Executive in 1992 and the Presidential Rank of Distinguished Executive in 1995.

On June 30, 1999, Griner received the space agency's highest honor, the Distinguished Service Medal, for her extraordinary contributions to NASA's missions.

She earned her bachelor's degree in astronautical engineering from Florida State University in Tallahassee in 1967. She has completed graduate work in industrial and systems engineering at the University of Alabama in Huntsville.

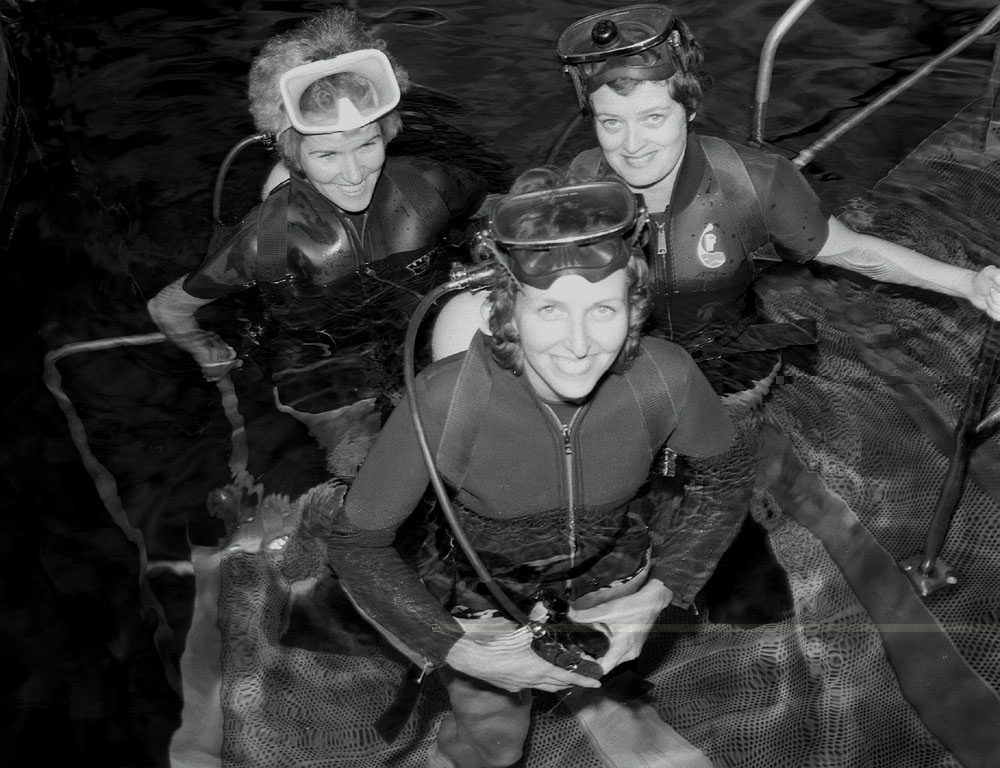
Candid shots of Carolyn Griner, Dr. Mary Helen Johnston, and Dr. Ann Whitaker (clockwise from front) wearing scuba gear at the Neutral Buoyancy Simulator for training in 1976.
