= Ann Whitaker =

American physicist

Ann Fite Whitaker is a retired American physicist who worked for many years at NASA on the effects of space environments on materials. Although she trained to become an astronaut, she never went to space.

== Early life and education ==
Whitaker is originally from Plainville, Georgia, and was educated at Calhoun High School (Georgia) and Berry College, near Rome, Georgia. Graduating in 1961, at the height of the Space race, she became one of the first women to earn a physics degree at the college.

She began graduate study with a fellowship to University of Alabama in Tuscaloosa, but left school for a position at NASA. Later, while working at NASA, she earned a master's degree in physics at the University of Alabama in Huntsville and an Ph.D. in materials engineering at Auburn University, completed in 1989 with a dissertation on the effects of oxygen plasma on polymers.

== Career and later life ==
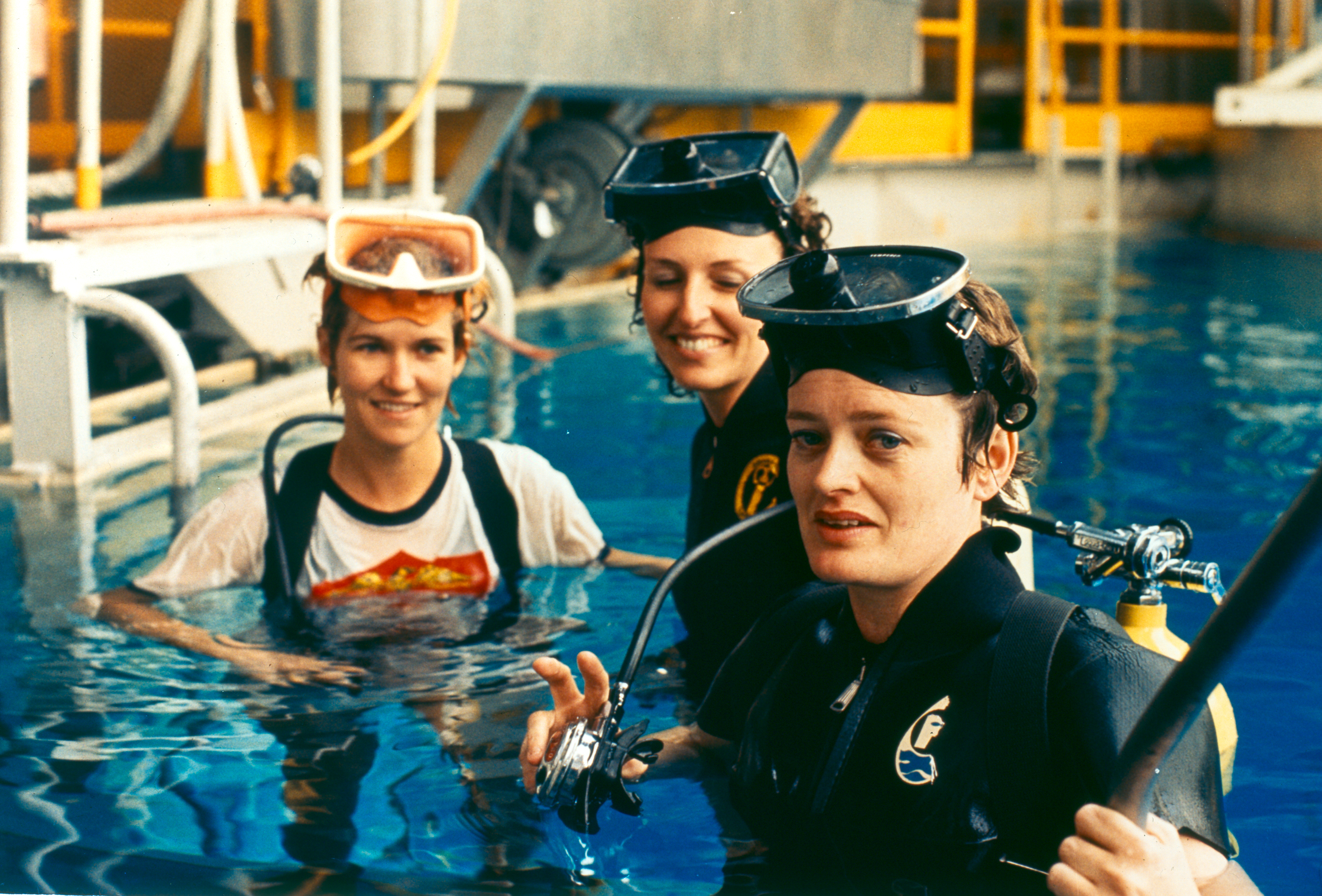
Whitaker (right) with Mary Helen Johnston and Carolyn S. Griner in training as a candidate payload specialist for space missions

Whitaker joined NASA's Marshall Space Flight Center in 1963. Her initial research there concerned she effects of space environments on lubrication and, later in the 1960s, on the crawler-transporter used to move Saturn V rockets before their launch. In the 1970s, she became a candidate payload specialist for space missions, and in 1974, she was one of four women chosen to perform a simulated Spacelab science mission, although she never went to space herself.

She became, successively, chief of the Physical Sciences Branch, Engineering Physics Division, and Project and Environmental Engineering Division at the Marshall Space Flight Center in 1977, 1984, and 1993, respectively. In 2001, after additional roles as deputy director of the Space Sciences Laboratory and director of the Materials, Processes and Manufacturing Department, she was named head of the Science Directorate at the Marshall Space Flight Center.

== Recognition ==
Berry College gave Whitaker their 1978 Alumni Award for Distinguished Achievement. In 2001 the Auburn University Department of Materials Engineering gave Whitaker their Outstanding Alumni Award; she became only the second recipient, after the award was founded in 1994. She was elected as a Fellow of the American Institute of Aeronautics and Astronautics (AIAA) in 2002. She was the recipient of the 2003–2004 Hermann Oberth Award of the Alabama–Mississippi Section of the AIAA.

She is also a recipient of the NASA Exceptional Service Medal, the NASA Exceptional Engineering Achievement Medal, and the Women in Science and Engineering Lifetime Achievement Award.
