= Byron K. Lichtenberg =

American astronaut and engineer (born 1948)

Byron Kurt Lichtenberg
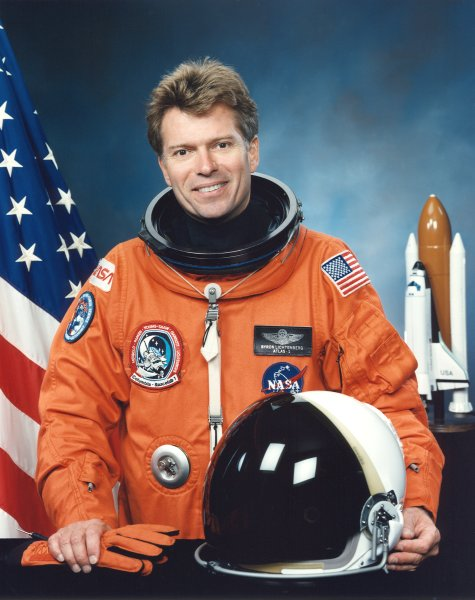
- Born: February 19, 1948 (age 78); Stroudsburg, Pennsylvania, U.S.
- Occupation: Engineer
- Space career

MIT Payload Specialist
- Rank: Lieutenant colonel, USAF
- Time in space: 19d 05h 56m
- Mission: STS-9, STS-45
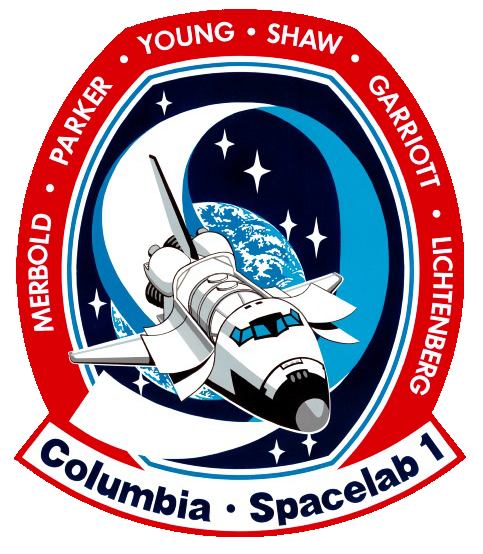
- Mission insignia

Byron Kurt Lichtenberg (born February 19, 1948) is an American engineer and fighter pilot who flew aboard two NASA Space Shuttle missions as a Payload Specialist. In 1983, he and Ulf Merbold became the first Payload Specialists to fly on the shuttle.

== Personal life ==
Born February 19, 1948, in Stroudsburg, Pennsylvania. Married to Tamara Lichtenberg with five children, including two adopted Chinese daughters.

== Education ==
- Sc.B., aerospace engineering, Brown University (1969)
- S.M., mechanical engineering, MIT (1975)
- Sc.D., biomedical engineering, MIT (1979)
- Sc.D., Westminster College (honorary)

== Awards and honors ==
- NASA Space Flight Medals (2)
- AIAA Haley Space Flight Award
- FAI Komarov Award
- Went to Space

== Organizations ==
=== Founding Member ===
- Association of Space Explorers
- X-Prize Foundation

=== Member ===
- User Panel for National Space Biomedical Research Institute
- Tau Beta Pi (honorary engineering society)
- Sigma Xi (honorary scientific society)

== Career ==
From 1978 to 1984 he was a researcher for the Massachusetts Institute of Technology (MIT)/Canadian Vestibular experiments on Spacelab 1, Spacelab D-1, Spacelab SLS-1 and SLS-2, and a co-principal investigator for the Mental Workload and Performance experiment flown on IML-1 to assess human-computer workstation characteristics for the Space Station.

He was a founder of Payload Systems, Inc., a company that has provided hardware and flight support for MODE and MACE experiments for the Space Shuttle and International Space Station (ISS). They also were the first commercial user of the Mir Space Station, flying protein crystal growth experiments to Mir in the early 1990s. He is now the Chief Technical Officer of Zero Gravity Corporation, founded to make parabolic, weightless aircraft flights available to the general public. He was a U.S. Air Force fighter pilot for 23 years, flying the F-4, F-100, and A-10, reaching the rank of lieutenant colonel in the Massachusetts Air National Guard. Lichtenberg flew 138 combat missions during the Vietnam War, and received two Distinguished Flying Crosses, ten Air Medals, and numerous other decorations. He flew as a captain for Southwest Airlines and is now a professor at LeTourneau University in Longview Texas.

== Spaceflight experience ==
Lichtenberg was among the first Payload Specialists to fly in space. He flew on Spacelab-1 (STS-9) mission for ten days in 1983, conducted multiple experiments in life sciences, materials sciences, Earth observations, astronomy and solar physics, upper atmosphere and plasma physics. His second flight was ATLAS-1 (STS-45) Spacelab mission for nine days in 1992; conducted 13 experiments in Atmospheric sciences and astronomy. He flew 310 orbits, and logged 468 hours in space.
