= STS-45 =

1992 American crewed spaceflight

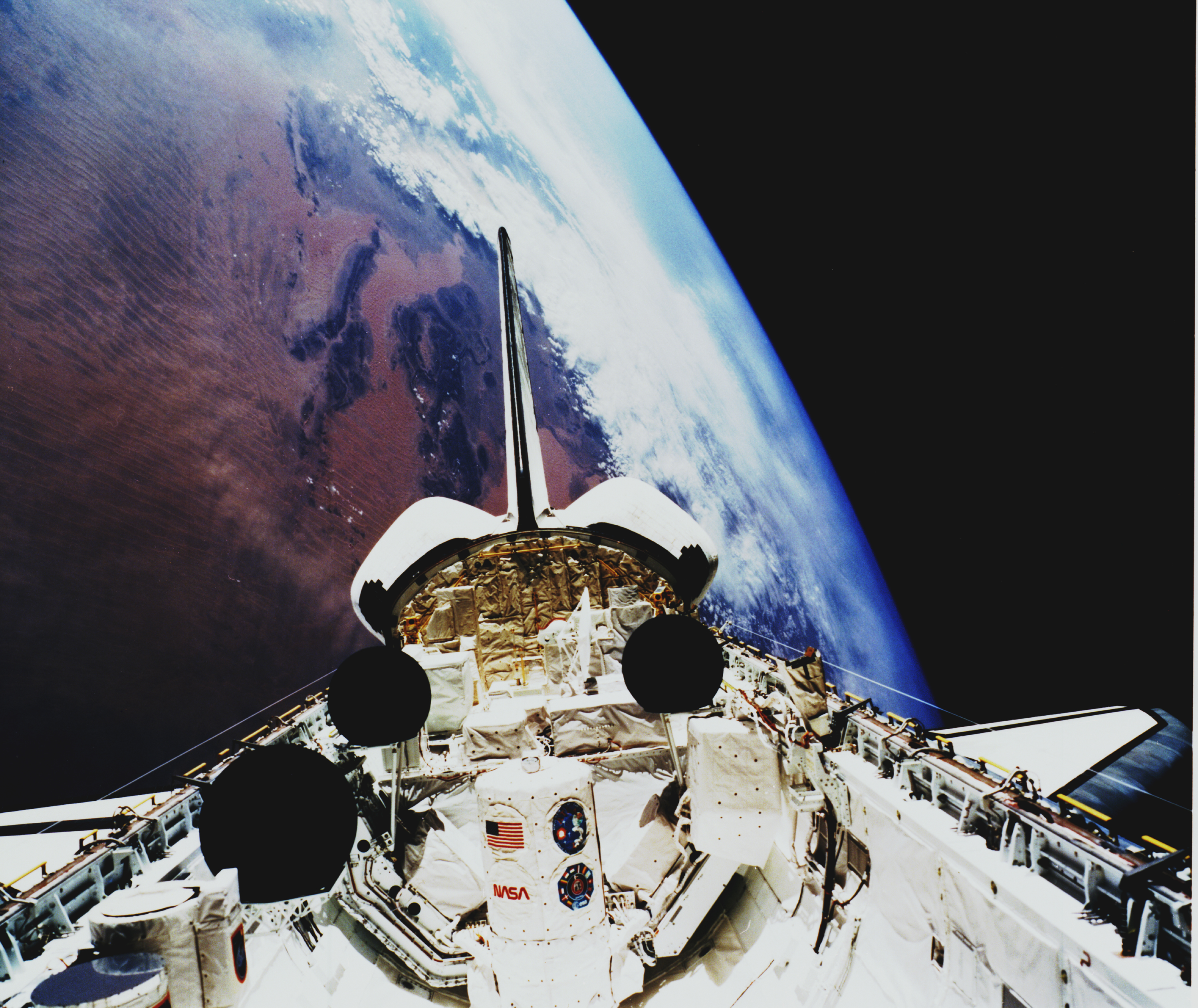
- Components of the ATLAS-1 laboratory in the payload bay of Atlantis
- Names: Space Transportation System-45
- Mission type: ATLAS-1 astronomy research
- Operator: NASA
- COSPAR ID: 1992-015A
- SATCAT no.: 21915
- Mission duration: 8 days, 22 hours, 9 minutes, 27 seconds
- Distance travelled: 5,211,340 km (3,238,180 mi)
- Orbits completed: 143

Spacecraft properties
- Spacecraft: Space Shuttle Atlantis
- Launch mass: 105,982 kg (233,650 lb)
- Landing mass: 93,009 kg (205,050 lb)
- Payload mass: 9,947 kg (21,929 lb)

Crew
- Crew size: 7
- Members: Charles Bolden; Brian Duffy; Kathryn D. Sullivan; David Leestma; Michael Foale; Dirk Frimout; Byron K. Lichtenberg

Start of mission
- Launch date: March 24, 1992, 13:13:39 UTC (8:13:39 am EST)
- Launch site: Kennedy, LC-39A
- Contractor: Rockwell International

End of mission
- Landing date: April 2, 1992, 11:23:06 UTC (6:23:06 am EST)
- Landing site: Kennedy, SLF Runway 33

Orbital parameters
- Reference system: Geocentric orbit
- Regime: Low Earth orbit
- Perigee altitude: 282 km (175 mi)
- Apogee altitude: 294 km (183 mi)
- Inclination: 57.00°
- Period: 90.30 minutes

Instruments
- Active Cavity Radiometer (ACR); Atmospheric Emissions Photometric Imager (AEPI); Atmospheric Lyman-Alpha Emissions (ALAE); Atmospheric Trace Molecule Spectroscopy (ATMOS); Far Ultraviolet Space Telescope (FAUST); Grille Spectrometer; Imaging Spectrometric Observatory (ISO); Millimeter Wave Atmospheric Sounder (MAS); Space Experiments with Particle Accelerators (SEPAC); Measurement of Solar Constant (SOLCON); Solar Spectrum (SOLSPEC); Solar Ultraviolet Spectral Irradiance Monitor (SUSIM)
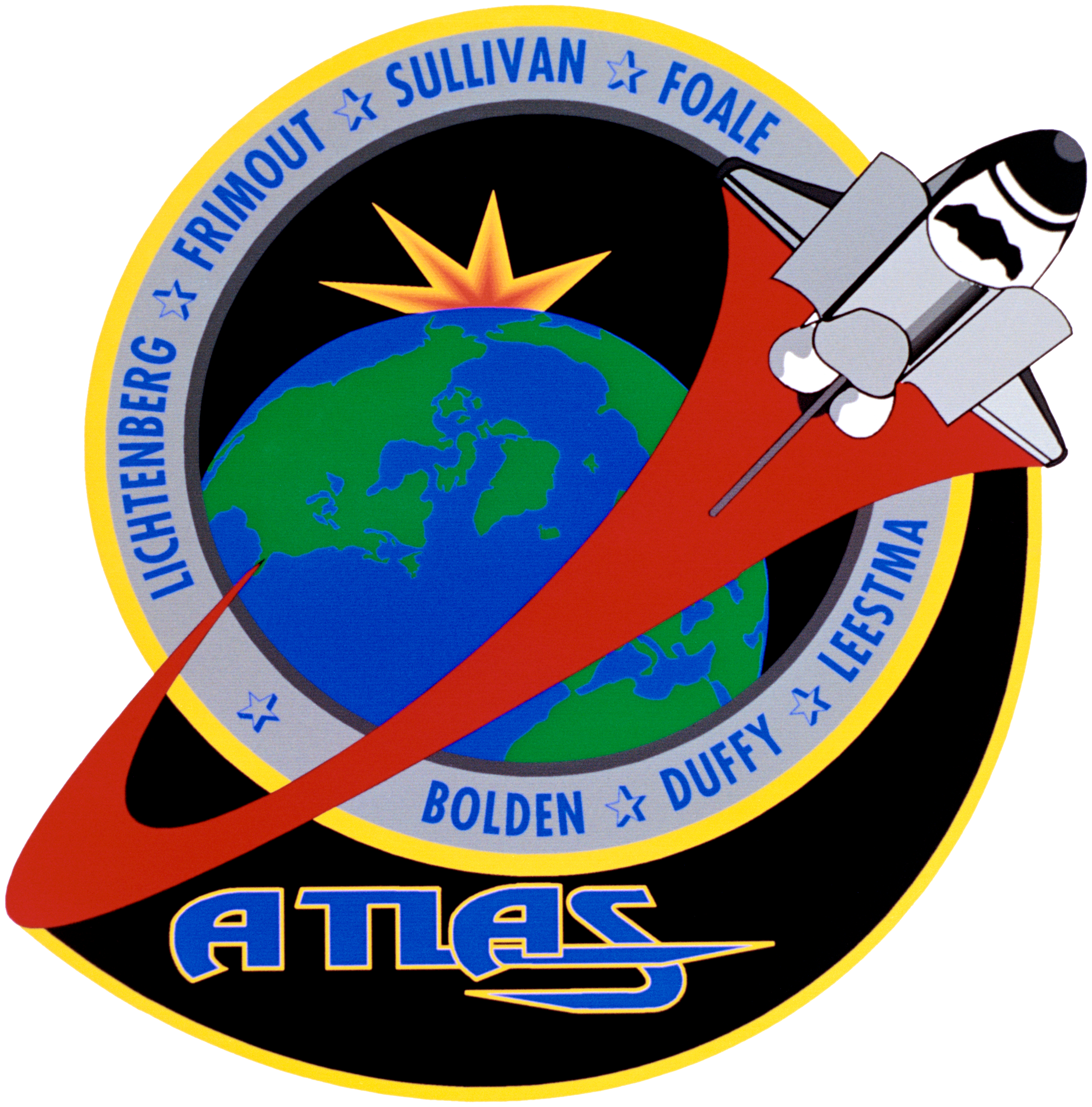
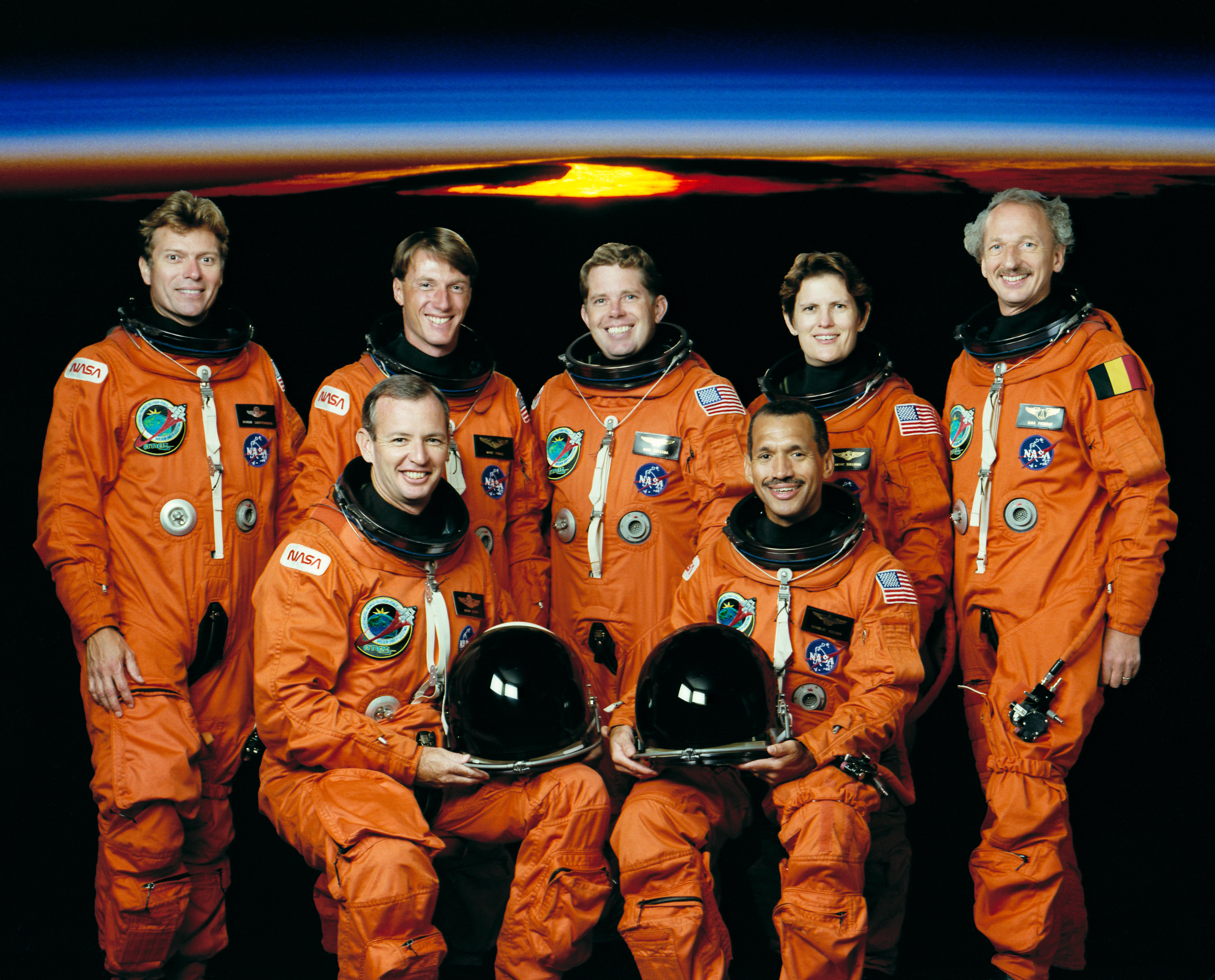
- STS-45 mission patch Standing: Lichtenberg, Foale, Leestma, Sullivan and Frimout; Seated: Duffy and Bolden Space Shuttle program

STS-45 was a 1992 NASA Space Shuttle mission using the Space Shuttle Atlantis. Its almost nine-day scientific mission was with a non-deployable payload of instruments. It was the 46th Space Shuttle mission and the 11th for Atlantis.

== Crew ==
Position	Astronaut
Commander	(United States) Charles Bolden; Third spaceflight
Pilot	(United States) Brian Duffy; First spaceflight
Mission Specialist 1	(United States) Kathryn D. Sullivan; Third and last spaceflight
Mission Specialist 2 Flight Engineer	(United States) David Leestma; Third and last spaceflight
Mission Specialist 3	(United States) / (United Kingdom) Michael Foale; First spaceflight
Payload Specialist 1	(Belgium) Dirk Frimout, ESA; Only spaceflight
Payload Specialist 2	(United States) Byron K. Lichtenberg; Second and last spaceflight
Member of Blue Team; Member of Red Team The astronauts were divided into a red team and a blue team to allow around-the-clock monitoring of experiments.

Backup crew
Position	Astronaut
Payload Specialist 1	(United States) Michael L. Lampton
Payload Specialist 2	(United States) Charles R. Chappell

=== Crew seat assignments ===
Seat	Launch	Landing	Seats 1–4 are on the flight deck. Seats 5–7 are on the mid-deck.
1	Bolden		Seats 1–4 are on the flight deck. Seats 5–7 are on the mid-deck.
2	Duffy		Seats 1–4 are on the flight deck. Seats 5–7 are on the mid-deck.
3	Sullivan	Foale	Seats 1–4 are on the flight deck. Seats 5–7 are on the mid-deck.
4	Leestma		Seats 1–4 are on the flight deck. Seats 5–7 are on the mid-deck.
5	Foale	Sullivan	Seats 1–4 are on the flight deck. Seats 5–7 are on the mid-deck.
6	Frimout		Seats 1–4 are on the flight deck. Seats 5–7 are on the mid-deck.
7	Lichtenberg		Seats 1–4 are on the flight deck. Seats 5–7 are on the mid-deck.

== Mission highlights ==
Attempt	Planned	Result	Turnaround	Reason	Decision point	Weather go (%)	Notes
1	23 Mar 1992, 8:01:00 am	Scrubbed	—	Technical	23 Mar 1992, 3:01 am		High concentrations of liquid oxygen and liquid hydrogen.
2	24 Mar 1992, 8:13:39 am	Success	1 day 0 hours 13 minutes				T−9 minute hold extended due to weather concerns.

Atlantis was launched on March 24, 1992, at 8:13 a.m. EST. The launch was originally scheduled for March 23, 1992, but was delayed by one day because of higher-than-allowable concentrations of liquid hydrogen and liquid oxygen in the orbiter's aft compartment during tanking operations. During troubleshooting, the leaks could not be reproduced, leading engineers to believe that they were the result of plumbing in the main propulsion system not thermally conditioned to the cryogenic propellants; the launch was rescheduled for March 24, 1992. Atlantis weighed 105,982 kg (233,650 lb) at launch.

STS-45 carried the first Atmospheric Laboratory for Applications and Science (ATLAS-1) experiments, placed on Spacelab pallets mounted in the orbiter's payload bay. The non-deployable payload, equipped with 12 instruments from the United States, France, Germany, Belgium, Switzerland, the Netherlands and Japan, conducted studies in atmospheric chemistry, solar radiation, space plasma physics and ultraviolet astronomy. ATLAS-1 instruments included the Atmospheric Trace Molecule Spectroscopy (ATMOS); Grille Spectrometer; Millimeter Wave Atmospheric Sounder (MAS); Imaging Spectrometric Observatory (ISO); Atmospheric Lyman-Alpha Emissions (ALAE); Atmospheric Emissions Photometric Imager (AEPI); Space Experiments with Particle Accelerators (SEPAC); Active Cavity Radiometer (ACR); Measurement of Solar Constant (SOLCON); Solar Spectrum; Solar Ultraviolet Spectral Irradiance Monitor (SUSIM); and Far Ultraviolet Space Telescope (FAUST). Other payloads included the Shuttle Solar Backscatter Ultraviolet (SSBUV) experiment, a Get Away Special (GAS) experiment and six mid-deck experiments.

The mission was extended by a day in order to continue science experiments. The landing occurred on April 2, 1992, 6:23 a.m. EST, on Runway 33 of the Shuttle Landing Facility, located at the Kennedy Space Center. The rollout distance was 2,812 m (9,226 ft) and Atlantis weighed 93,005 kg (205,041 lb) on landing.

== Mission insignia ==
The mission insignia covers all aspects of the flight, by featuring Earth and the Sun, and the orbiter on high inclination, as to illustrate the high importance of the mission. The names of all flying members are included in the band, separated by stars. In the 'ring' at the bottom right, a single star is included, separating the unmentioned names of the alternate mission specialists, who are therefore indirectly included; a first and unique tribute to a support crew. Dirk Frimout is the first Belgian citizen to fly into space, and the only one to fly on a Space Shuttle (the other is Frank De Winne (who flies to the International Space Station via Soyuz as mission commander), as the Space Shuttle program was terminated at the time of the latter's flight), but to keep the focus on the mission, no national flag is added nor the customary logo of the European Space Agency (ESA), but the mission main objective, ATLAS, is included below instead.

== See also ==
- List of human spaceflights
- List of Space Shuttle missions
- Nikon NASA F4
- Outline of space science
- Space Shuttle
