= Mary Helen Johnston =

American scientist and astronaut

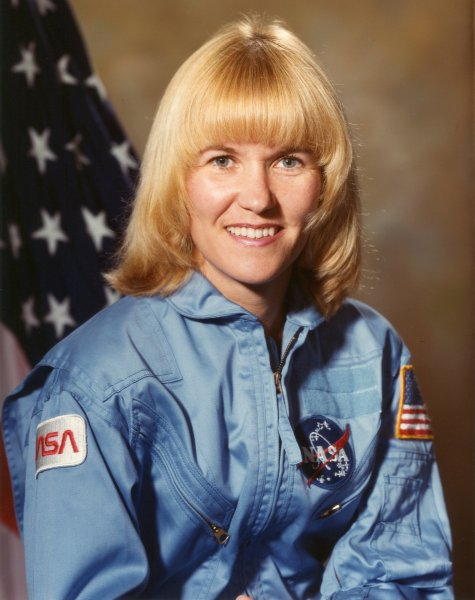
- Johnston in 1985
- Born: September 17, 1945 (age 81); West Palm Beach, Florida, US
- Occupations: Scientist, astronaut
- Awards: NASA Exceptional Scientific Achievement Medal (1982)
- Space career
- Selection: Spacelab-3 (1983)
- Mission: STS-51-B
- Retired: May 6, 1985

Academic background
- Education: Florida State University (BS; MS); University of Florida (PhD)
- Thesis: Effect of gravity forces on crystal growth parameters in tin (1973)
- Doctoral advisor: David Hale Baldwin

Academic work
- Discipline: Engineering
- Sub-discipline: Laser-induced surface improvement
- Institutions: University of Tennessee Space Institute; Florida Institute of Technology
- Scientific career
- Fields: Materials science (metallurgical engineering), Aerospace engineering, Laser research, Hydrogen research

Mary Helen Johnston (born September 17, 1945), later also Mary Helen McCay, is an American scientist and former astronaut. Working with NASA as an engineer in the 1960s and '70s, Johnston aspired to be an astronaut; she unsuccessfully applied in 1980 before becoming a payload specialist in 1983. Johnston retired from NASA in 1986 without having gone to space. She is a professor at Florida Institute of Technology.

== Early life and education ==
Mary Helen Johnston was born in West Palm Beach, Florida, and grew up in the nearby Fort Pierce. As a child, she was inspired to engineering and space exploration by the arrival of Sputnik and by the Kennedy Space Center, which was located near her home.

Johnston graduated in 1966 with a Bachelor of Science in engineering from Florida State University (FSU), and with a Master of Science in 1969. In 1973, she was awarded a doctorate in metallurgical engineering, from the University of Florida, while working under the direction on David H. Baldwin. Johnston was the first woman to receive an engineering degree from FSU. Of her time at university, Johnston has said: "It was a different time, for sure. It's still unusual for me when I find myself in a meeting with all women, because throughout most of my career I have gone into meetings where the rooms were filled with men."

== NASA career ==
Johnston began working at the Marshall Space Flight Center (MSFC) of NASA during her engineering studies from 1963 to 1968. In 1968, she became employed there as a metallurgist.

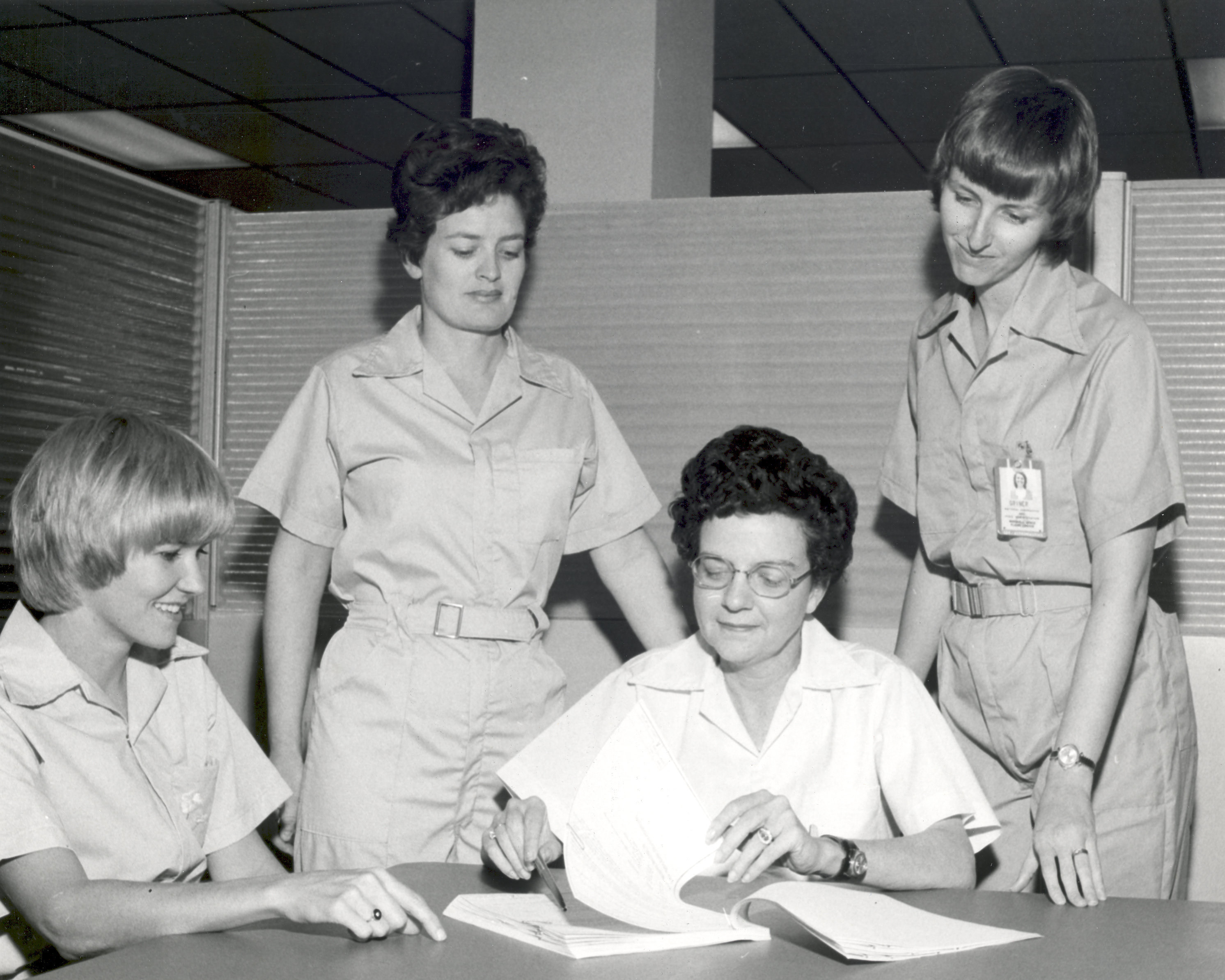
Johnston (left, seated) and her colleagues at the outset of the five-day GPL exercise in 1974

In 1974, she worked with Doris Chandler, Carolyn S. Griner and Ann Whitaker on the simulation of a space mission at the General Purpose Laboratory (GPL) of MSFC. The exercise was named Concept Verification Test (CVT) Test No. 4 and began on December 16 for five days. The team of four women, all scientists, conducted eleven experiments to test their feasibility before they were carried out in the Spacelab of the Space Shuttle. These experiments were carried out under conditions identical to those of the Space Shuttle (temperature, humidity, air circulation, etc.) except for the weightlessness. These tests included some in the neutral buoyancy simulator, itself a mock-up of one to be built in Europe to provide training for future astronauts. Johnston led three science experiments, and helped her fellow scientists to develop techniques to be used on Spacelab. In 1976, she indicated that she "had planned the work in hopes of going on orbital missions in the 1980s."

In 1976, Johnston worked with Griner on MSFC experiments testing space-like conditions with Space Processing Applications Rocket (SPAR) launched objects, particularly involving "dendrite remelting and macrosegregation".

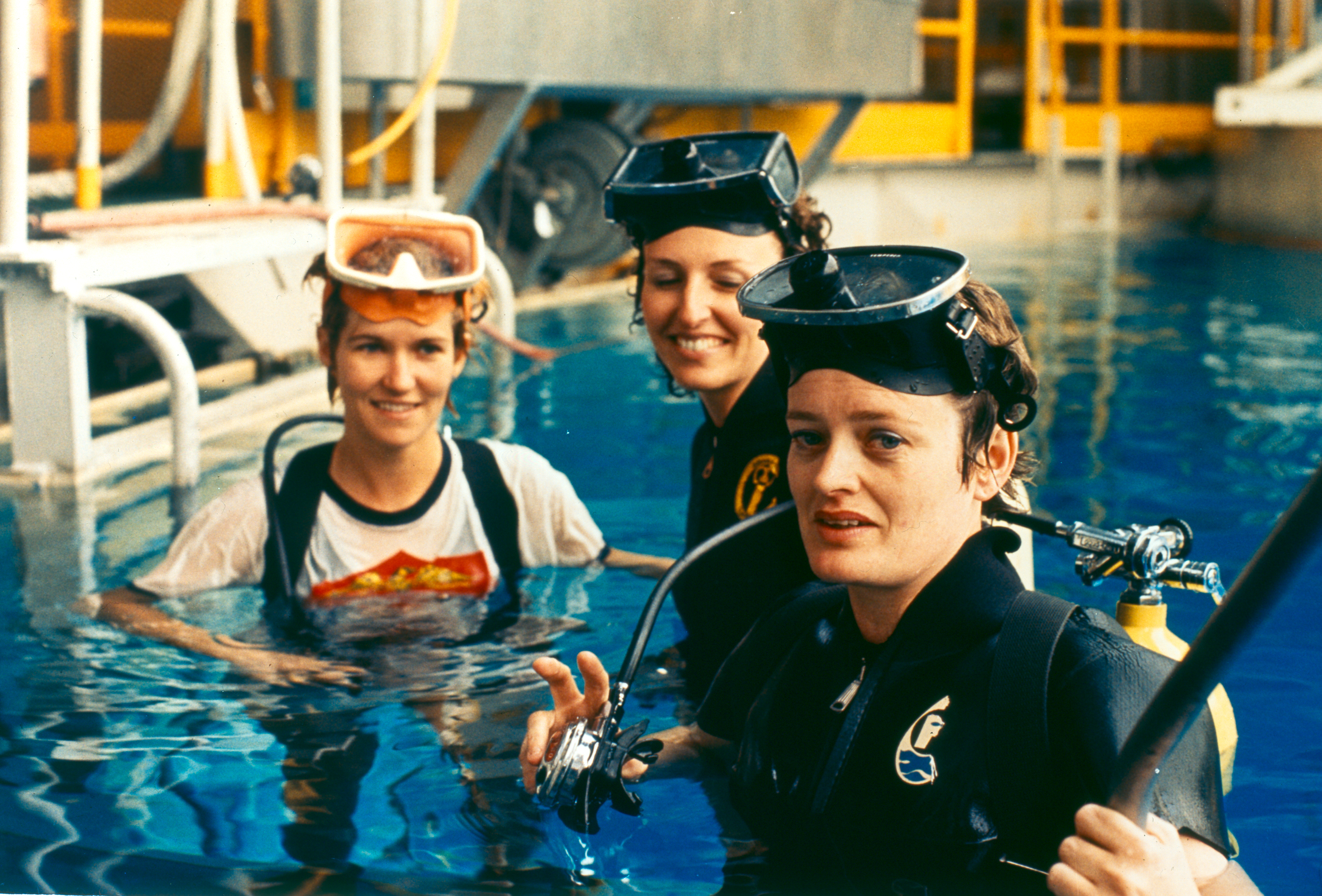
Johnston (left) with Ann Whitaker and Carolyn S. Griner in training as a candidate payload specialist for space missions in 1973

With Whitaker and Griner, Johnston received astronaut training. Her training included tests in the pool of the MSFC neutral buoyancy laboratory and a flight in microgravity aboard the Boeing KC-135 Stratotanker, as well as completing additional flight lessons. In 1980, Johnston applied to be an astronaut in the Group 9 selection, but was unsuccessful.

Johnston received the NASA Exceptional Scientific Achievement Medal in 1982.

On June 5, 1983, she was selected as one of the four payload specialists for the STS-51-B Spacelab mission (Spacelab-3 group) as part of the reserve crew, not flying – she never went to space. For Spacelab, Johnston was selected as a scientist, specifically for her knowledge in materials science, one of the mission's primary purposes. She and the other alternate, Eugene Trinh, also provided support from Johnson Space Center "as members of the mission management and science team responsible for controlling and directing experiment operations from the Payload Operations Control Center (POCC)". Of her selection, mission manager Joseph Cremin wrote: "The job ahead is difficult and the time is short which makes this assignment a significant challenge that will require the utmost dedication and perseverance of Dr. Johnston. I have no doubt that she will accomplish this assignment in an exemplary fashion."

Johnston later spoke of her involvement in the mission:

I got involved in what was called the 'Manufacturing–in–Space' program, and it has morphed into commercialization in space and such [...] I was really interested in working on things that could be produced in space. To me, being a researcher, scientist, and engineer, the best way to do that was to get up there with a bunch of equipment and find out what worked, because it's almost impossible to imagine what some things will do where there is absolutely no gravity. It was great fun, especially if you were a scientific gadfly, because there were astronomy experiments, experiments with rats and monkeys, and crystal–growth experiments, for instance. This was an international laboratory.

She ended her astronaut career on May 6, 1985.

== Later career ==
Leaving NASA in 1986, Johnston – at this point known as McCay – became a professor, teaching at the University of Tennessee Space Institute. A later role came in 2003, when she was appointed the director of the National Center for Hydrogen Research at Florida Institute of Technology (FIT). She is married to Dr. T. Dwayne McCay, who is also a former NASA engineer and the president and CEO of FIT.

As an inventor, Johnston holds two dozen patents, many applying to laser-surface modification. While at the University of Tennessee, one of Johnston's inventions in laser surfacing received numerous awards and commendations, including the American Museum of Science and Energy Award for Technical Achievement, the university's Wheeley Award for Excellence in Technology Transfer and Chancellor's Award for Creativity in Research. In 2018 she was made a Fellow of the National Academy of Inventors.
