= Dirk Frimout =

Belgian astronaut (born 1941)

The Viscount Frimout
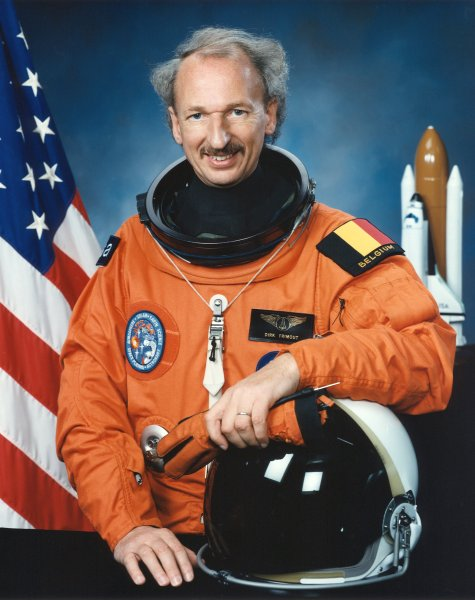
- Born: 21 March 1941 (age 85); Poperinge, Belgium
- Occupation: Astrophysicist
- Space career

ESA Payload Specialist
- Time in space: 8d 22h 09m
- Mission: STS-45
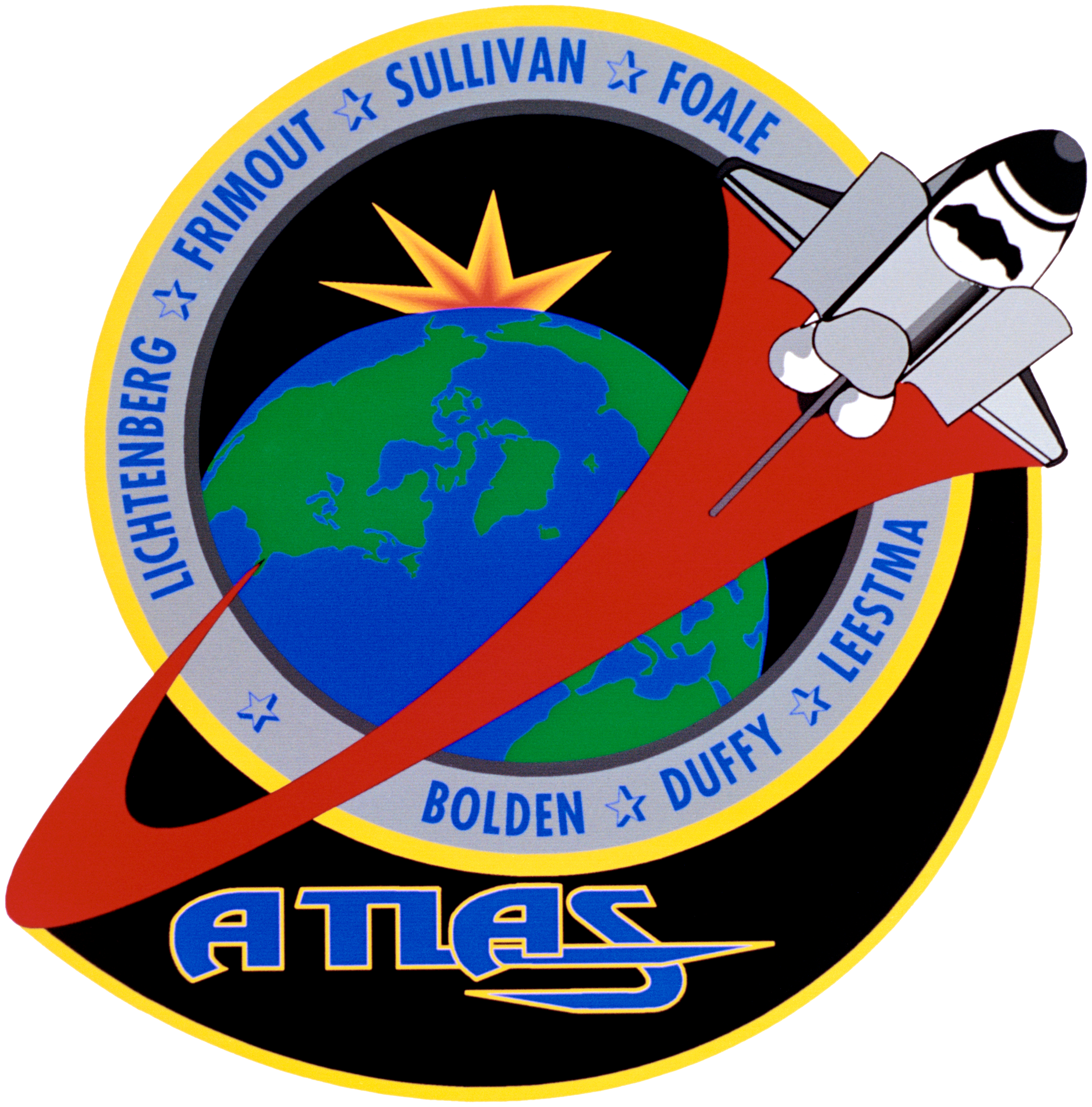
- Mission insignia

Dirk Dries David Damiaan, Viscount Frimout (born 21 March 1941 in Poperinge, Belgium) is a Belgian astrophysicist for the European Space Agency. In 1992 he flew aboard NASA Space Shuttle mission STS-45 as a payload specialist, making him the first Belgian in space.

== Education ==
Frimout attended elementary School in Poperinge, and secondary School at the Koninklijk Technisch Atheneum (K.T.A) in Ghent, Belgium. He received a degree in electrical engineering from the University of Ghent in 1963 and a PhD in applied physics from the same institution in 1970; this was followed by post-doctoral research at the University of Colorado at Boulder in the Laboratory for Atmospheric and Space Physics (as a European Space Research Organization fellow) in 1971–1972.

== Career ==
- 1965-1978 Belgian Institute for Space Aeronomy. As Head of Section Instrumentation, performed experiments with stratospheric balloons and sounding rockets.
- 1978-1984 European Space Agency (ESA) as Crew Activities Coordinator and Experiment Coordinator for Spacelab-1.
- 1984-1989 Microgravity Division of ESTEC, responsible for sounding rocket program, parabolic flights, experiments on EURECA, reflight of Spacelab-1 experiments.

Frimout flew as a payload specialist on STS-45 Atlantis (24 March to 2 April 1992). STS-45 was launched from and returned to land at the Kennedy Space Center, Florida. It was the first Spacelab mission dedicated to NASA's Mission to Planet Earth. During the nine-day flight, the crew aboard Atlantis operated the twelve experiments that constituted the ATLAS-1 (Atmospheric Laboratory for Applications and Science) cargo. ATLAS-1 obtained a vast array of detailed measurements of atmospheric chemical and physical properties, which contributed significantly to improving our understanding of our climate and atmosphere. In addition, this was the first time an artificial beam of electrons was used to stimulate a man-made auroral discharge. At mission conclusion, Frimout had traveled 3.2 million miles in 143 Earth orbits and logged over 214 hours in space.

His flight made him instantaneously very famous in Belgium and triggered what was called Frimout-mania. Prince Philippe of Belgium talked with him when he was in space and a ticker tape parade was organized when he came back to Belgium.

Currently, Frimout is an ESA staff member. He is a senior engineer in the Payload Utilization Department of the Columbus Directorate, responsible for the ESA support to the European experiments on ATLAS-1, and the Microgravity Measurement Assembly to be flown on D2.

He has authored more than 30 publications relating to Atmospheric Physics Experiments, Crew Training for Spacelab, and Microgravity Experiments.

== Personal ==
He is married and has two children. Hobbies include running, cycling, walking, traveling, and chess.

== Awards and honors ==
- 1971–72 Postdoctoral Research Fellow from ESRO (European Space Research Organization).
- After his spaceflight, Frimout was ennobled and given the title of viscount in the Belgian nobility.

== Organizations ==
- Fellow of the Royal Academies for Science and the Arts of Belgium, Class of Technical Sciences, since 2009.
- Associate member of the Belgian National Council for Space Research.
- Member of K VIV (Royal Association of Flemish Engineers).
- Association of Engineers from the University of Ghent.
