= Frederick W. Leslie =

American astronaut and scientist (born 1951)

Fred Weldon Leslie
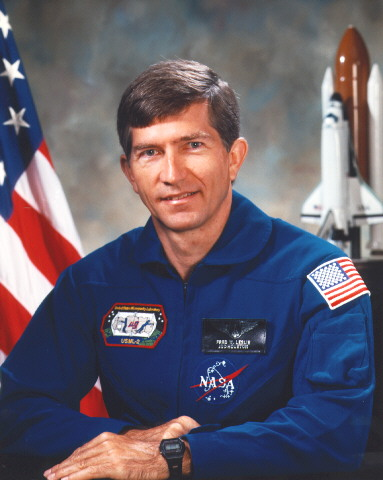
- Born: 19 December 1951 (age 74); Ancón, Panama
- Occupation: Scientist
- Space career

NASA Payload Specialist
- Time in space: 15d 21h 34m
- Missions: STS-73

Fred Weldon Leslie is a Panamanian-born American scientist who flew on the NASA STS-73 Space Shuttle mission as a payload specialist.

== Background ==
Leslie was born on 19 December 1951, in Ancón, Panama. He is an instrument-rated commercial pilot with more than 900 hours in various aircraft. Leslie graduated from Irving High School, Irving, Texas, in 1970, then received a Bachelor of Science degree in engineering science from The University of Texas in 1974, and a master's degree and Doctor of Philosophy degrees in meteorology with a minor in fluid mechanics from the University of Oklahoma in 1977 and 1979, respectively. Leslie served on the American Institute of Aeronautics and Astronautics Fluid Dynamics Technical Committee. he is a member of the American Meteorological Society, Tau Beta Pi, Chi Epsilon Pi, and the United States Parachute Association. He holds a World Record as a participant in the 200-person freefall formation set in October 1992.

== Academic career ==
After Leslie earned his Ph.D. in 1979, he served as a postdoctoral research associate at Purdue University studying fluid vortex dynamics. In 1980, he worked for the Universities Space Research Association as a visiting scientist at the Marshall Space Flight Center (MSFC).

== NASA career ==
Leslie began work for NASA in 1980 as a research scientist in the Space Science Laboratory at the Marshall Space Flight Center. Since 1983, he has served as a co-investigator for the Geophysical Fluid Flow Cell experiment, which examines spherical rotating convection relevant to the atmospheres of stars and planets. The experiment flew on Spacelab 3 and is also a part of the United States Microgravity Laboratory-2 (USML-2) payload. Leslie was a principal investigator for the Fluid Interface and Bubble Experiment, examining the behavior of a rotating free surface aboard NASA's KC-135 aircraft flying low-gravity trajectories. He is an author on 27 journal papers, 45 conference papers, and nine NASA reports involving atmospheric and fluid dynamic phenomena. Leslie also worked in the MSFC Neutral Buoyancy Simulator as a suited subject and safety diver supporting procedure tests for extra-vehicular activity.

In 1987, he was appointed chief of the Fluid Dynamics Branch, where he led a team of over a dozen scientists, overseeing and participating in both laboratory and theoretical research He was also the mission scientist for Spacelab J (STS-47), coordinating more than 40 domestic and Japanese experiments in fluid dynamics, crystal growth, and life science during the 8-day mission.

Leslie is a researcher at the Marshall Space Flight Center. He is a member of the research team analyzing data from the Geophysical Fluid Flow Cell experiment that flew on STS-73/USML-2.

== Spaceflight ==
Leslie flew as a payload specialist on STS-73 launched on 20 October 1995, and landed at the Kennedy Space Center on 5 November 1995. The 16-day mission aboard Space Shuttle Columbia focused on materials science, biotechnology, combustion science, and fluid physics contained within the pressurized Spacelab module.
