= STS-9 =

1983 American crewed spaceflight and first flight with Spacelab

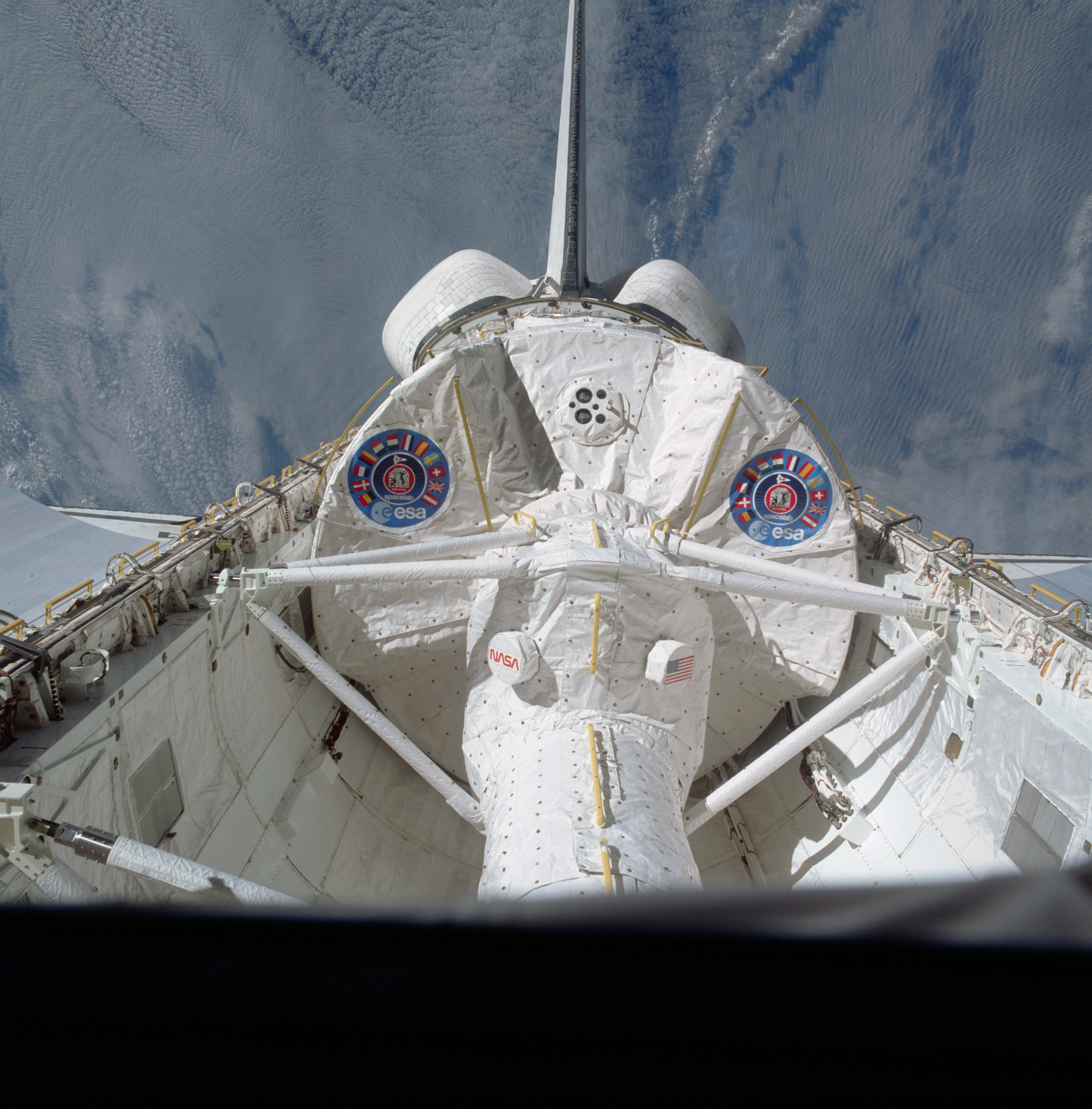
- View of Columbia's payload bay, showing Spacelab.
- Names: Space Transportation System-9; Spacelab 1
- Mission type: Microgravity research
- Operator: NASA
- COSPAR ID: 1983-116A
- SATCAT no.: 14523
- Mission duration: 10 days, 7 hours, 47 minutes, 24 seconds
- Distance travelled: 6,913,504 km (4,295,852 mi)
- Orbits completed: 167

Spacecraft properties
- Spacecraft: Space Shuttle Columbia
- Launch mass: 112,918 kg (248,942 lb)
- Landing mass: 99,800 kg (220,000 lb)
- Payload mass: 15,068 kg (33,219 lb)

Crew
- Crew size: 6
- Members: John Young; Brewster H. Shaw; Robert A. Parker; Owen Garriott; Byron K. Lichtenberg; Ulf Merbold

Start of mission
- Launch date: November 28, 1983, 16:00:00 UTC (11:00 am EST)
- Launch site: Kennedy, LC-39A
- Contractor: Rockwell International

End of mission
- Landing date: December 8, 1983, 23:47:24 UTC (3:47:24 pm PST)
- Landing site: Edwards, Runway 17

Orbital parameters
- Reference system: Geocentric orbit
- Regime: Low Earth orbit
- Perigee altitude: 240 km (150 mi)
- Apogee altitude: 253 km (157 mi)
- Inclination: 57.00°≠≈
- Period: 89.50 minutes
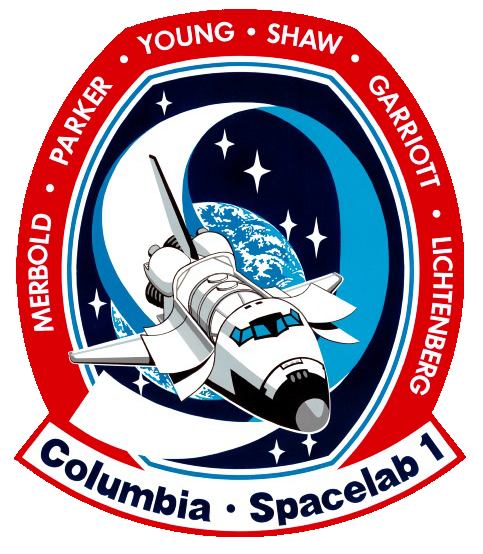
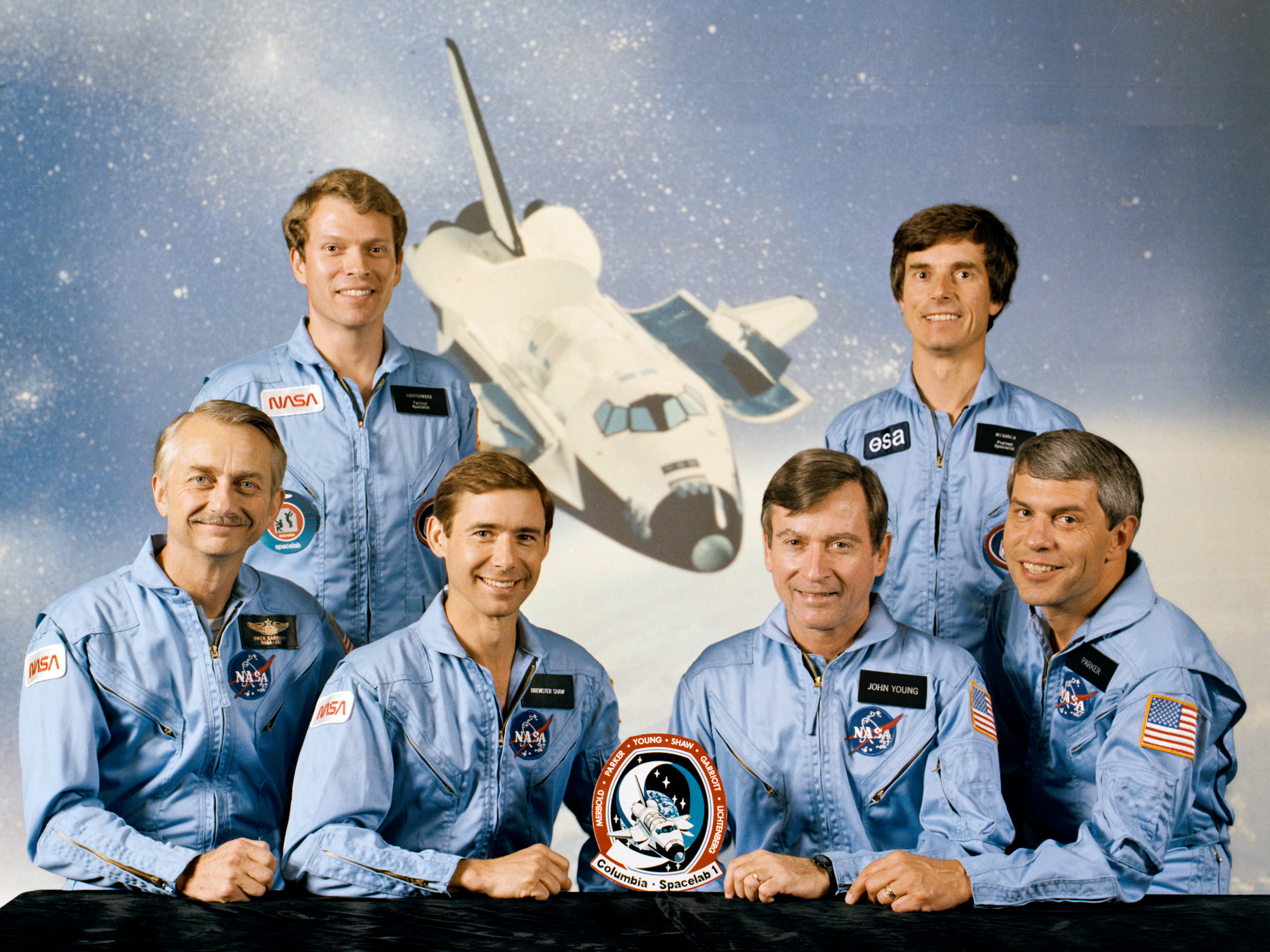
- STS-9 mission patch From left: Garriott, Lichtenberg, Shaw, Young, Merbold and Parker Space Shuttle program

STS-9 (also referred to Spacelab 1) was the ninth NASA Space Shuttle mission and the sixth mission of the Space Shuttle Columbia. Launched on November 28, 1983, the ten-day mission carried the first Spacelab laboratory module into orbit.

STS-9 was also the last time the original STS numbering system was used until STS-26, which was designated in the aftermath of the 1986 Challenger disaster of STS-51-L. Under the new system, STS-9 would have been designated as STS-41-A. STS-9's originally planned successor, STS-10, was canceled due to payload issues; it was instead followed by STS-41-B. After this mission, Columbia was taken out of service for renovations and did not fly again until STS-61-C in early January 1986.

STS-9 sent the first non-U.S. citizen into space on the Shuttle, Ulf Merbold, becoming the first European Space Agency astronaut and first West German citizen to go into space.

== Crew ==
Position	Astronaut
Commander	(United States) John Young; Sixth and last spaceflight
Pilot	(United States) Brewster H. Shaw; First spaceflight
Mission Specialist 1	(United States) Owen Garriott; Second and last spaceflight
Mission Specialist 2 Flight Engineer	(United States) Robert A. Parker; First spaceflight
Payload Specialist 1	(Germany) Ulf Merbold, ESA; First spaceflight
Payload Specialist 2	(United States) Byron K. Lichtenberg; First spaceflight
Member of Blue Team; Member of Red Team

Backup crew
Position	Astronaut
Payload Specialist 1	(Netherlands) Wubbo Ockels, ESA
Payload Specialist 2	(United States) Michael Lampton

=== Support crew ===
- John E. Blaha (entry CAPCOM)
- Franklin R. Chang-Diaz
- Mary L. Cleave
- Anna L. Fisher
- William F. Fisher
- Guy S. Gardner (ascent CAPCOM)
- Charles Lewis (Marshall CAPCOM)
- William Bock (Marshall CAPCOM)
- Bryan D. O'Connor
- Wubbo Ockels

=== Crew seat assignments ===
Seat	Launch	Landing	Seats 1–4 are on the flight deck. Seats 5–7 are on the mid-deck.
1	Young		Seats 1–4 are on the flight deck. Seats 5–7 are on the mid-deck.
2	Shaw		Seats 1–4 are on the flight deck. Seats 5–7 are on the mid-deck.
3	Unused		Seats 1–4 are on the flight deck. Seats 5–7 are on the mid-deck.
4	Parker		Seats 1–4 are on the flight deck. Seats 5–7 are on the mid-deck.
5	Garriott		Seats 1–4 are on the flight deck. Seats 5–7 are on the mid-deck.
6	Lichtenberg		Seats 1–4 are on the flight deck. Seats 5–7 are on the mid-deck.
7	Merbold		Seats 1–4 are on the flight deck. Seats 5–7 are on the mid-deck.

== Mission background ==
STS-9's six-member crew, the largest of any human space mission at the time, included John W. Young, commander, on his second shuttle flight; Brewster H. Shaw, pilot; Owen K. Garriott and Robert A. Parker, both mission specialists; and Byron K. Lichtenberg and Ulf Merbold, payload specialists – the first two non-NASA astronauts to fly on the Space Shuttle. Merbold, a citizen of West Germany, was the first foreign citizen to participate in a Space Shuttle flight. Lichtenberg was a researcher at the Massachusetts Institute of Technology (MIT). Prior to STS-9, the scientist-astronaut Garriott had spent 56 days in orbit in 1973 aboard Skylab. Commanding the mission was veteran astronaut John W. Young, making his sixth and final flight over an 18-year career that saw him fly twice each in Project Gemini, Apollo, and the Space Shuttle, which included two journeys to the Moon and making him the most experienced space traveler to date. Young, who also commanded Columbia on its maiden voyage STS-1, was the first person to fly the same space vehicle into orbit more than once. STS-9 marked the only time that two pre-Shuttle era astronaut veterans (Garriott and Young) would fly on the same Space Shuttle mission. STS-9 was also the first Space Shuttle mission to have more than one veteran astronaut.

The mission was devoted entirely to Spacelab 1, a joint NASA/European Space Agency (ESA) program designed to demonstrate the ability to conduct advanced scientific research in space. Both the mission specialists and payload specialists worked in the Spacelab module and coordinated their efforts with scientists at the Marshall Space Flight Center (MSFC) Payload Operations Control Center (POCC), which was then located at the Johnson Space Center (JSC) in Texas. Funding for Spacelab 1 was provided by the ESA.

== Shuttle processing ==
After Columbia's return from STS-5 in November 1982, it received several modifications and changes in preparation for STS-9. Most of these changes were intended to support the Spacelab module and crew, such as the addition of a tunnel connecting the Spacelab to the orbiter's airlock, and additional provisions for the mission's six crew members, such as a galley and sleeping bunks. Columbia also received the more powerful Space Shuttle Main Engines introduced with Challenger, which were rated for 104% maximum thrust; its original main engines were later refurbished for use with Atlantis, which was still under construction at the time. Also added to the shuttle were higher capacity fuel cells and a Ku-band antenna for use with the Tracking and Data Relay Satellite (TDRS).

The mission's original launch date of October 29, 1983, was scrubbed due to concerns with the exhaust nozzle on the right solid rocket booster (SRB). For the first time in the history of the shuttle program, the shuttle stack was rolled back to the Vehicle Assembly Building (VAB), where it was destacked and the orbiter returned to the Orbiter Processing Facility (OPF), while the suspect booster underwent repairs. The shuttle was restacked and returned to the launch pad on November 8, 1983.

== Launch attempts ==
Attempt	Planned	Result	Turnaround	Reason	Decision point	Weather go (%)	Notes
1	29 Oct 1983, 12:00:00 pm	Scrubbed	—	Technical	19 Oct 1983, 12:00 am (T−43:00:00)		SRB nozzle issues. Launch and decision point times are approximate, dates are accurate.
2	28 Nov 1983, 11:00:00 am	Success	29 days 22 hours 60 minutes				

== Mission insignia ==
The mission's main payload, Spacelab 1, is depicted in the payload bay of the Columbia. The nine stars and the path of the orbiter indicate the flight's numerical designation, STS-9.

== Mission summary ==
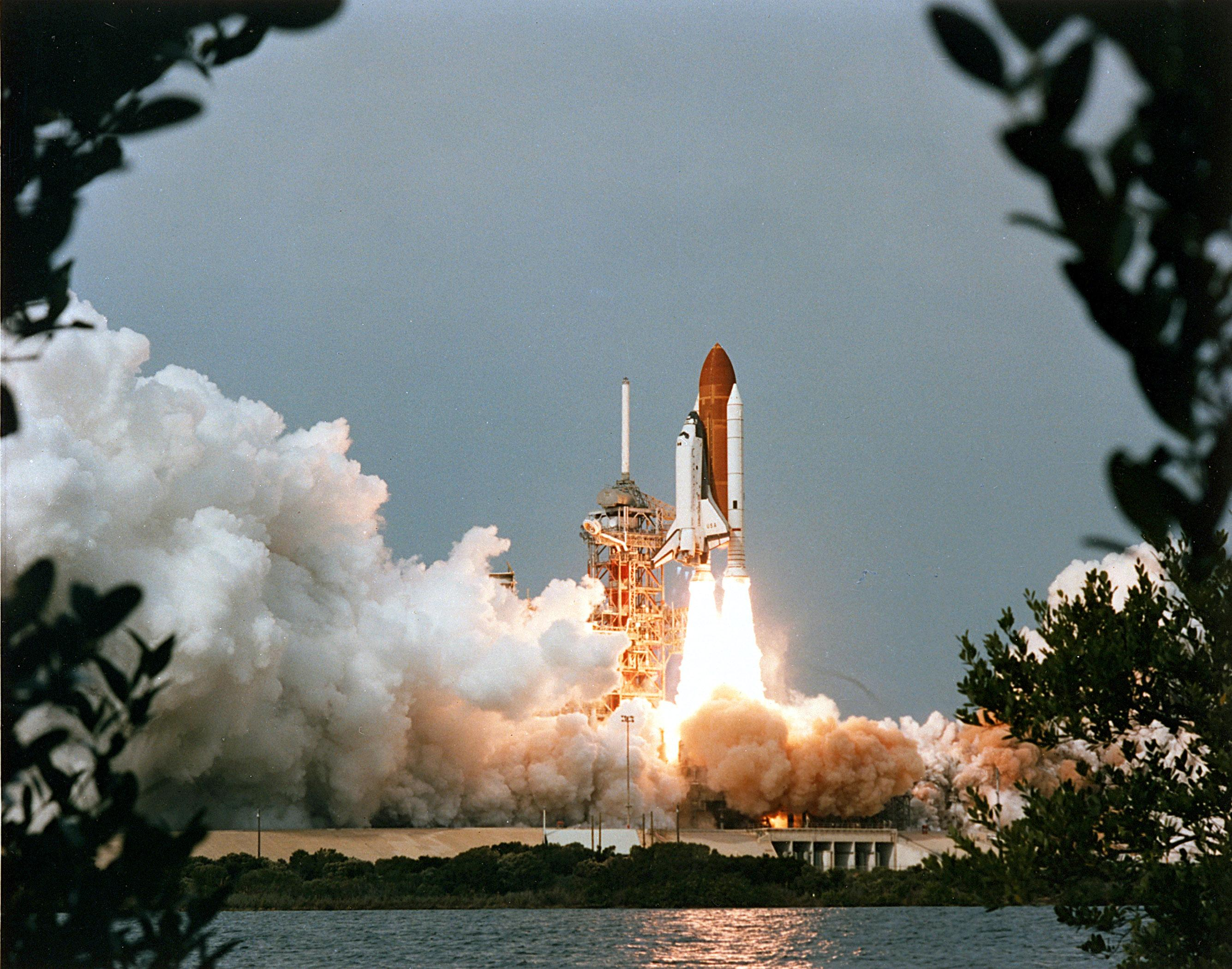
STS-9 launches from Kennedy Space Center, on November 28, 1983.

STS-9 launched successfully from Kennedy Space Center at 11:00:00 a.m. EST on November 28, 1983. The shuttle's crew was divided into two teams, each working 12-hour shifts for the duration of the mission. Young, Parker and Merbold formed the Red Team, while Shaw, Garriott and Lichtenberg made up the Blue Team. Usually, Young and Shaw were assigned to the flight deck, while the mission and payload specialists worked inside the Spacelab.

Over the course of the mission, 72 scientific experiments were carried out, spanning the fields of atmospheric and plasma physics, astronomy, solar physics, material sciences, technology, astrobiology and Earth observations. The Spacelab effort went so well that the mission was extended an additional day to 10 days, making it the longest-duration shuttle flight at that time. In addition, Garriott made the first ham radio transmissions by an amateur radio operator in space during the flight. This led to many further space flights incorporating amateur radio as an educational and back-up communications tool.

The Spacelab 1 mission was highly successful, proving the feasibility of the concept of carrying out complex experiments in space using non-NASA persons trained as payload specialists in collaboration with a POCC. Moreover, the TDRS-1 satellite, now fully operational, was able to relay significant amounts of data through its ground terminal to the POCC.

During orbiter orientation, four hours before re-entry, one of the flight control computers crashed when the Reaction Control System (RCS) thrusters were fired. A few minutes later, a second crashed in a similar fashion, but was successfully rebooted. Young delayed the landing, letting the orbiter drift. He later testified: "Had we then activated the Backup Flight Software, loss of vehicle and crew would have resulted". Post-flight analysis revealed the GPCs (General Purpose Computers) failed when the RCS thruster motion knocked a piece of solder loose and shorted out the CPU board. A GPC running BFS may or may not have the same soldering defect as the rest of the GPCs. Switching the vehicle to the BFS from normal flight control can happen relatively instantaneously, and that particular GPC running the BFS could also be affected by the same failure due to the soldering defect. If such a failure occurred, switching the vehicle back to normal flight control software on multiple GPCs from a single GPC running BFS takes a lot longer, in essence leaving the vehicle without any control at all during the change.

Columbia landed on Runway 17 at Edwards Air Force Base on December 8, 1983, at 03:47:24 p.m. PST, having completed 167 orbits and travelled 4.3 million miles (6.9 million kilometres) over the course of its mission. Right before landing, two of the orbiter's three auxiliary power units (APUs) caught fire due to a hydrazine leak, but the orbiter nonetheless landed successfully. Columbia was ferried back to KSC on December 15, 1983. The leak was later discovered after it had burned itself out and caused major damage to the compartment. By this time, Discovery had been delivered just three weeks before the launch of STS-9. This allowed NASA to take Columbia out of service for an extensive renovation and upgrade program to bring it up to date with Challenger as well as Discovery and later on Atlantis, which would be delivered in 1985. As a result, Columbia would not fly at all during 1984–1985.

== See also ==
- List of human spaceflights
- List of Space Shuttle missions
- List of spaceflight-related accidents and incidents
