= Fire urgency estimator in geosynchronous orbit =

Wildfire damage mitigation proposal

Fire Urgency Estimator in Geosynchronous Orbit (FUEGO) is a proposed method for early detection and evaluation of wildfires using a system of drones and satellites in geosynchronous orbit equipped with infrared sensors. Use of drones has been described as a potential problem due to Federal Aviation Administration's policy concerning use of airspace during fires. In 2021, the project received $1.5 million USD from the Gordon and Betty Moore Foundation to develop a preliminary system of infra-red cameras aboard 'spotter' planes, to provide a proof of concept.

The concept was published in the journal Remote Sensing. The research is led by Carlton Pennypacker who is an astrophysicist at UC Berkeley.
