= STS-73 =

1995 American crewed spaceflight

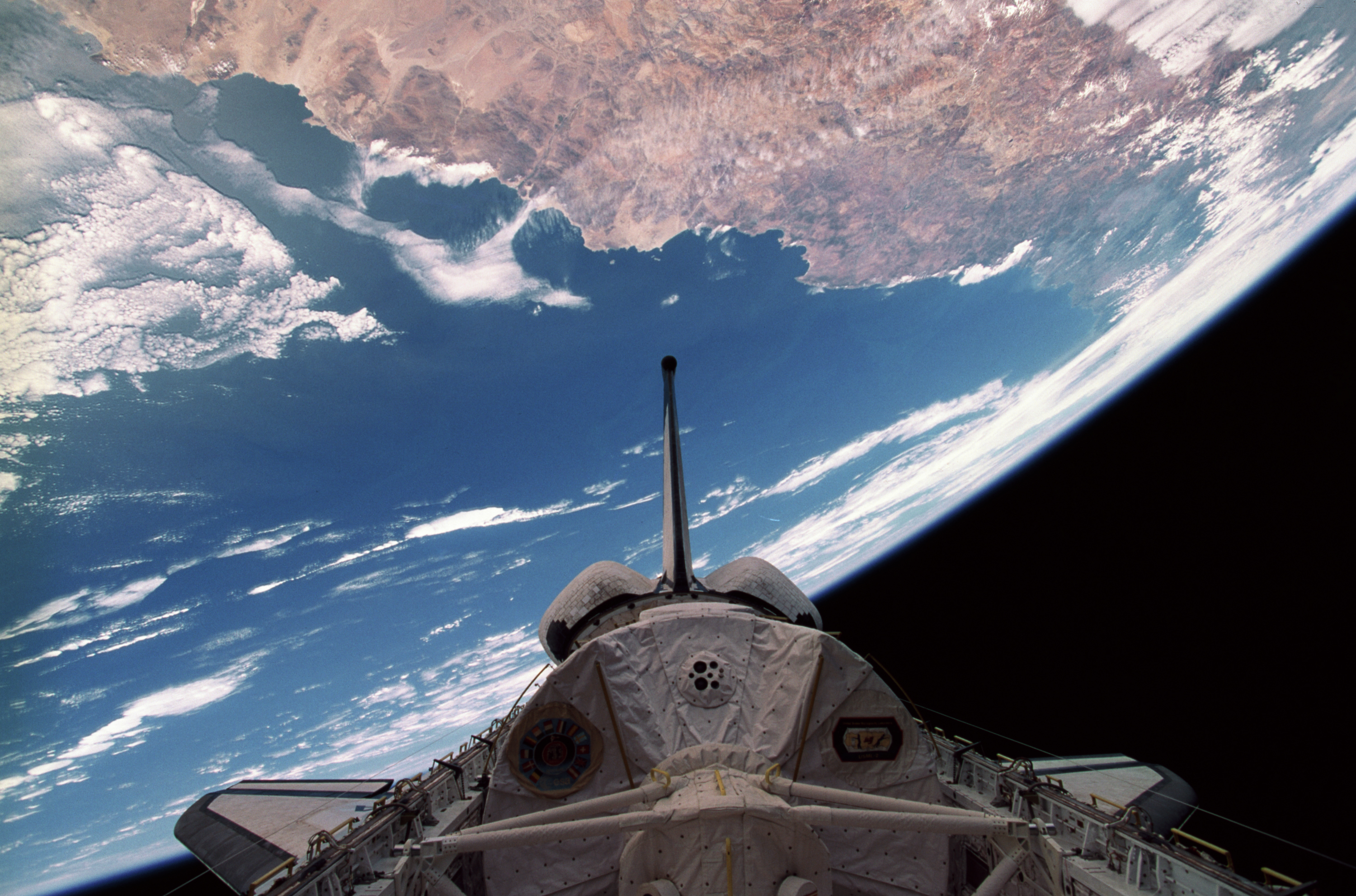
- Spacelab Module LM1 in Columbia's payload bay, serving as the United States Microgravity Laboratory
- Mission type: Microgravity research
- Operator: NASA
- COSPAR ID: 1995-056A
- SATCAT no.: 23688
- Mission duration: 15 days, 21 hours, 53 minutes, 16 seconds
- Distance travelled: 10,600,000 kilometres (6,600,000 mi)
- Orbits completed: 255

Spacecraft properties
- Spacecraft: Space Shuttle Columbia
- Payload mass: 15,250 kilograms (33,620 lb)

Crew
- Crew size: 7
- Members: Kenneth D. Bowersox; Kent V. Rominger; Kathryn C. Thornton; Catherine G. Coleman; Michael López-Alegría; Fred W. Leslie; Albert Sacco Jr.

Start of mission
- Launch date: 20 October 1995, 13:53:00 UTC
- Launch site: Kennedy, LC-39B

End of mission
- Landing date: 5 November 1995, 11:45:21 UTC
- Landing site: Kennedy, SLF Runway 33

Orbital parameters
- Reference system: Geocentric
- Regime: Low Earth
- Perigee altitude: 241 kilometres (150 mi)
- Apogee altitude: 241 kilometres (150 mi)
- Inclination: 39.0 degrees
- Period: 89.7 min
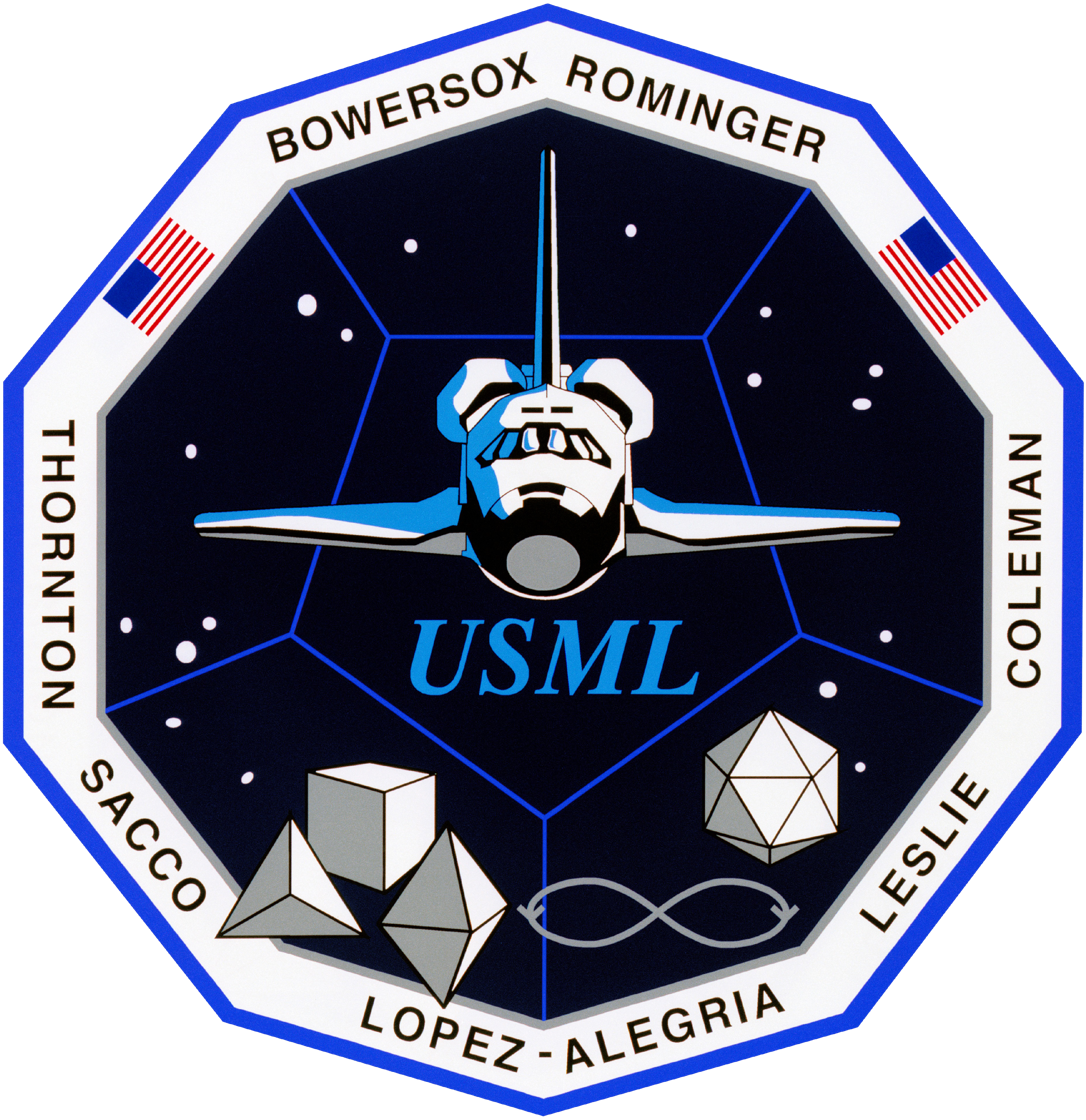
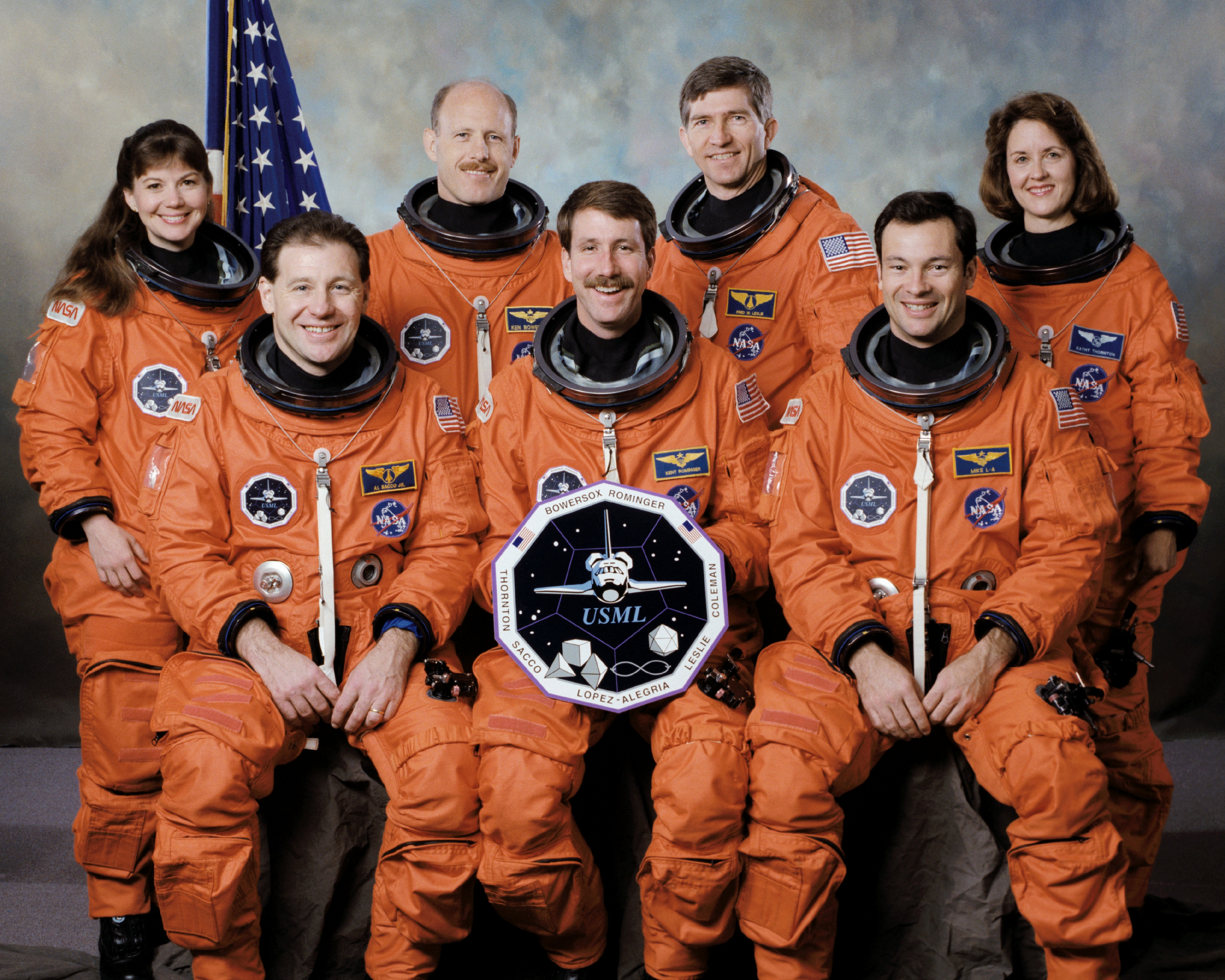
- Left to right - Seated: Sacco, Rominger, Lopez-Alegria; Standing: Coleman, Bowersox, Leslie, Thornton Space Shuttle program

STS-73 was a Space Shuttle program mission, during October–November 1995, on board the Space Shuttle Columbia. The mission was the second mission for the United States Microgravity Laboratory. The crew, who spent 16 days in space, were broken up into 2 teams, the red team and the blue team. The mission also included several Detailed Test Objectives or DTO's.

== Crew ==
Position	Astronaut
Commander	Kenneth D. Bowersox; Third spaceflight
Pilot	Kent V. Rominger; First spaceflight
Mission Specialist 1	Catherine G. Coleman; First spaceflight
Mission Specialist 2 Flight Engineer	Michael López-Alegría; First spaceflight
Mission Specialist 3	Kathryn C. Thornton; Fourth and last spaceflight
Payload Specialist 1	Fred W. Leslie; Only spaceflight
Payload Specialist 2	Albert Sacco Jr. Only spaceflight
Member of Blue Team; Member of Red Team

=== Backup crew ===
Position	Astronaut
Payload Specialist 1	R. Glynn Holt; Only spaceflight
Payload Specialist 2	David H. Matthiesen; Only spaceflight

=== Crew seat assignments ===
Seat	Launch	Landing	Seats 1–4 are on the flight deck. Seats 5–7 are on the mid-deck.
1	Bowersox		Seats 1–4 are on the flight deck. Seats 5–7 are on the mid-deck.
2	Rominger		Seats 1–4 are on the flight deck. Seats 5–7 are on the mid-deck.
3	Coleman	Thornton	Seats 1–4 are on the flight deck. Seats 5–7 are on the mid-deck.
4	Lopez-Alegria		Seats 1–4 are on the flight deck. Seats 5–7 are on the mid-deck.
5	Thornton	Coleman	Seats 1–4 are on the flight deck. Seats 5–7 are on the mid-deck.
6	Leslie		Seats 1–4 are on the flight deck. Seats 5–7 are on the mid-deck.
7	Sacco		Seats 1–4 are on the flight deck. Seats 5–7 are on the mid-deck.

== Mission highlights ==
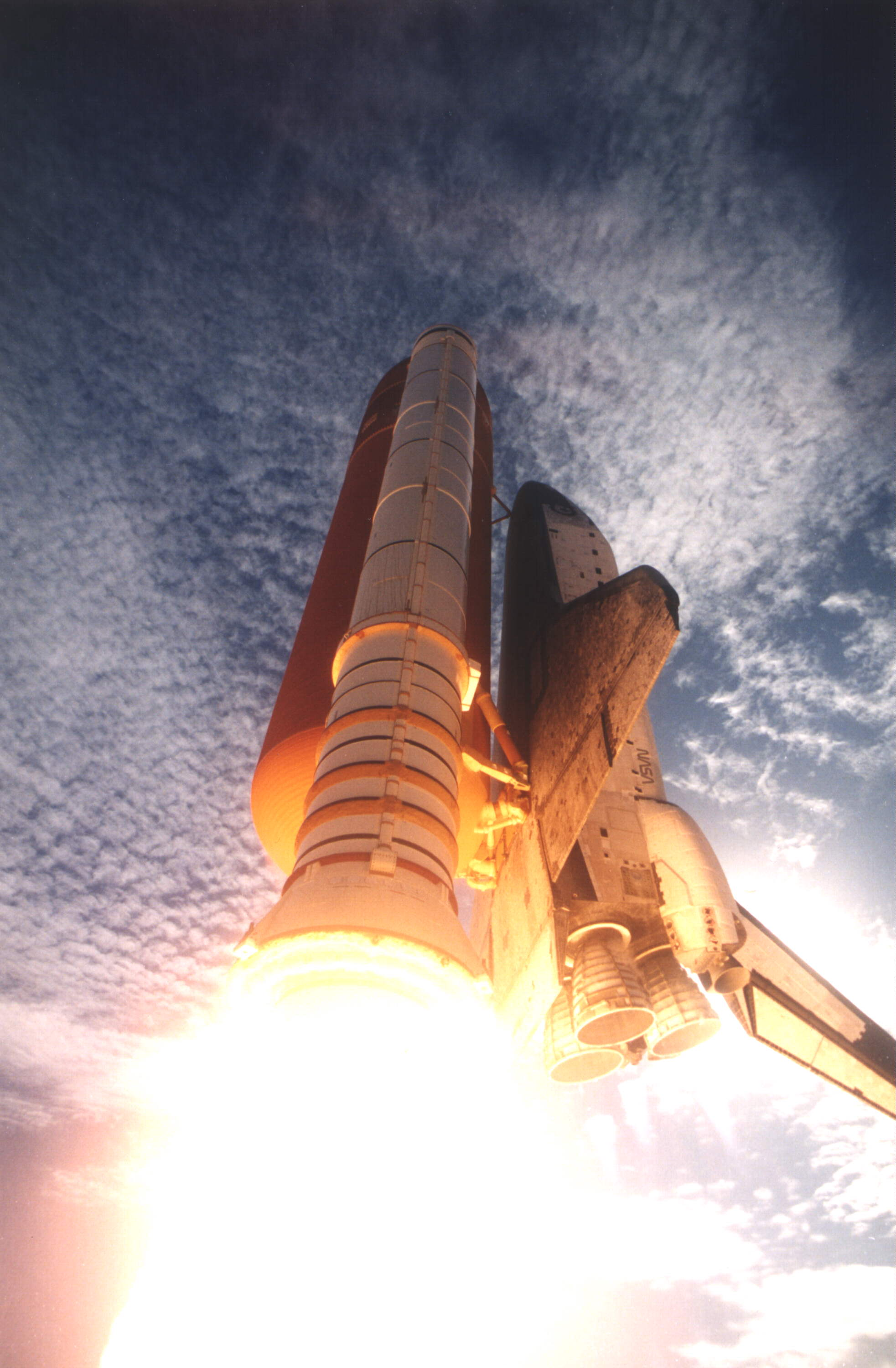
Launch of STS-73

Attempt	Planned	Result	Turnaround	Reason	Decision point	Weather go (%)	Notes
1	28 Sep 1995, 9:35:00 am	Scrubbed	—	Technical	28 Sep 1995, 4:00 am (T−03:30:00)	60	Hydrogen leak in SSME no. 1.
2	5 Oct 1995, 9:40:00 am	Scrubbed	7 days 0 hours 5 minutes	Weather	4 Oct 1995, 2:00 pm (T−11:00:00 hold)	30	Strong winds and rain forecasted due to Hurricane Opal.
3	6 Oct 1995, 9:40:00 am	Scrubbed	1 day 0 hours 0 minutes	Technical	6 Oct 1995, 3:05 am	30	Problem with hydraulic system no. 1.
4	7 Oct 1995, 9:41:00 am	Scrubbed	1 day 0 hours 1 minute	Technical	7 Oct 1995, 10:00 am (T−00:20:00 hold)	60	Master events controller problem.
5	14 Oct 1995, 9:46:00 am	Scrubbed	7 days 0 hours 5 minutes	Technical	13 Oct 1995, 3:32 pm (T−11:00:00 hold)	80	Examinations of the SSME were required due to an oxidizer leak in a test engine.
6	15 Oct 1995, 10:46:00 am	Scrubbed	1 day 1 hour 0 minutes	Weather	15 Oct 1995, 1:25 pm (T−00:05:00)	20	Poor weather at KSC and RTLS.
7	20 Oct 1995, 9:53:00 am	Success	4 days 23 hours 7 minutes			40	Countdown held at T−5 minutes due to range safety problem.

The second United States Microgravity Laboratory (USML-2) Spacelab mission was the prime payload on STS-73. The 16-day flight continued a cooperative effort of the U.S. government, universities and industry to push back the frontiers of science and technology in "microgravity", the near-weightless environment of space.

On October 26, through pre-recorded video, Mission Commander Ken Bowersox threw out the first pitch for Game 5 of the 1995 World Series between the Cleveland Indians and the Atlanta Braves from orbit.

Some of the experiments carried on the USML-2 payload were suggested by the results of the first USML mission that flew aboard Columbia in 1992 during STS-50. The USML-1 mission provided new insights into theoretical models of fluid physics, the role of gravity in combustion and flame spreading, and how gravity affects the formation of semiconductor crystals. Data collected from several protein crystals grown on USML-1 enabled scientists to determine the molecular structures of those proteins.

USML-2 built on that foundation. Technical knowledge gained was incorporated into the mission plan to enhance procedures and operations. Where possible, experiment teams refined their hardware to increase scientific understanding of basic physical processes on Earth and in space, as well as to prepare for more advanced operations aboard the International Space Station and other future space programs.

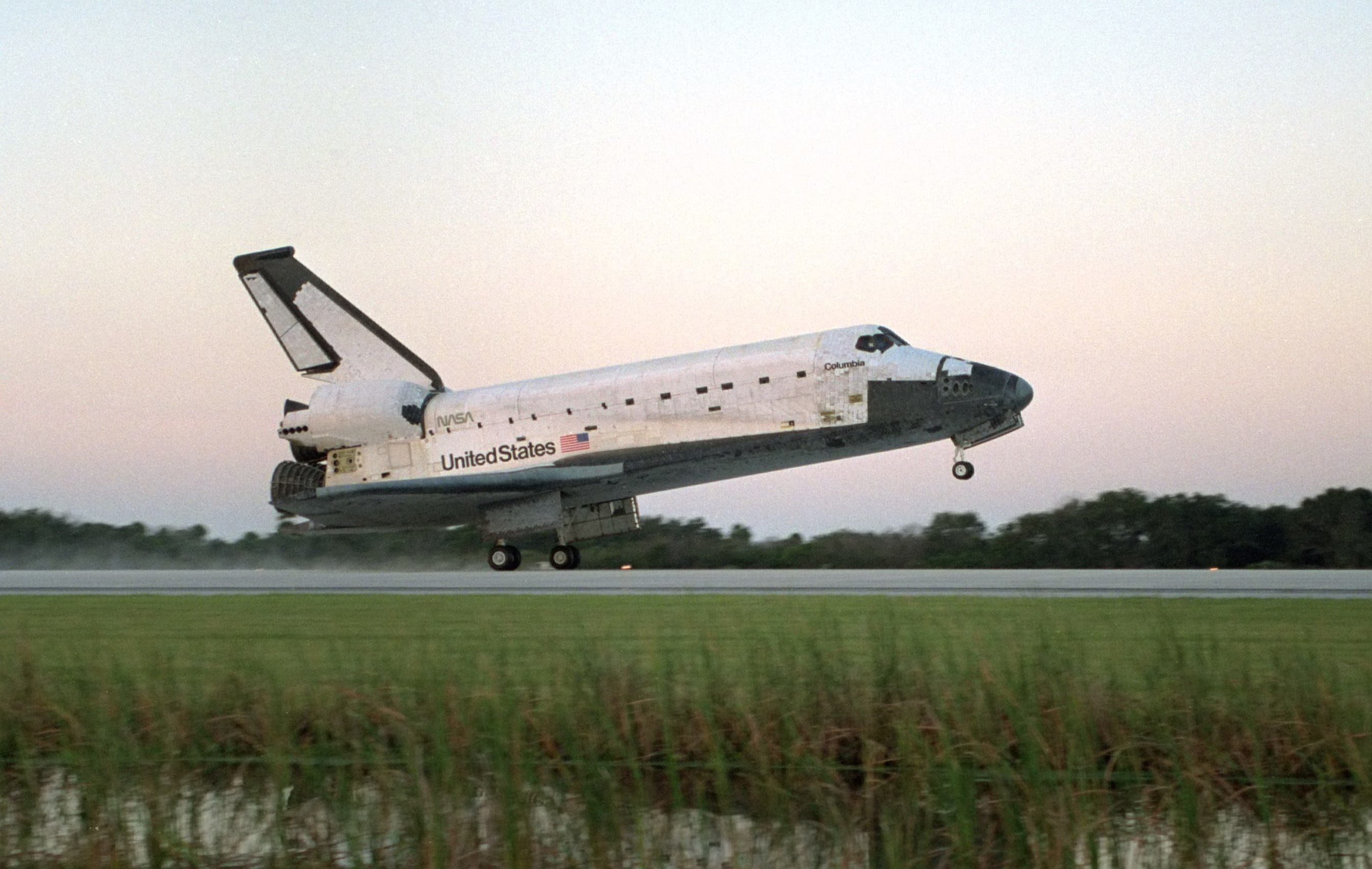
The landing of STS-73.

USML-2 Flight controllers and experiment scientists directed science activities from NASA's Spacelab Mission Operations Control facility at the Marshall Space Flight Center. In addition, science teams at several NASA centers and universities monitored and supported operations of a number of experiments.

Other payloads on board included the Orbital Acceleration Research Experiment (OARE), Space Acceleration Measurement System (SAMS), Three Dimensional Microgravity Accelerometer (3DMA), Suppression of Transient Accelerations By Levitation Evaluation (STABLE) and the High-Packed Digital Television Technical Demonstration system.

Launch was originally scheduled for 25 September 1995 but endured six scrubbed launch attempts before its 20 October 1995 lift off. STS-73 and STS-61C both carry the distinction of being tied for the most scrubbed launches, each having launched on their seventh attempt.

After the mission, five of the crew members, namely, Bowersox, Coleman, Thornton, Leslie, and Sacco appeared on the 13 February 1996 episode of Home Improvement, "Fear of Flying", on a segment of Tool Time. It was Bowersox's second time on the show.

== See also ==
- List of human spaceflights
- List of Space Shuttle missions
- Outline of space science
- Space Shuttle
- STS-80 (17-day 8-hour Shuttle mission)
- STS-78 (16-day 21-hour Shuttle mission)
- STS-67 (16 days 15-hour Shuttle mission)
