= German astronaut team =

Representative astronaut team of Germany

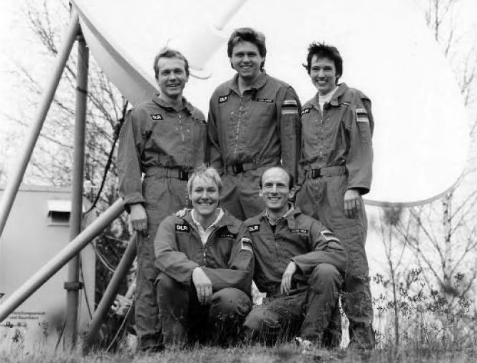
German astronaut team

The German astronaut team was established in 1987. Before the establishment of the team, then-West German astronauts were selected for single missions, or as part of the European Space Agency's crewed spaceflight activities. East Germany had its first cosmonaut, Sigmund Jähn; Jähn was both West and East Germany's first citizen in space when he departed from Baikonur in the Soviet Union in August and returned to Earth in September 1978. West and East Germany reunified in 1990 and the astronaut team became representative of a single German nation.

In 1998, the team became part of the European Astronaut Corps.

== History ==
In 1976, East Germany selected Sigmund Jähn and Eberhard Köllner as the participants of Intercosmos missions to the Soviet Salyut 6 space station. Jähn flew in 1978 on Soyuz 31.

In 1978, the ESA selected a first group of astronauts to fly on the Space Shuttle on Spacelab missions. Among this first group was Ulf Merbold, who then also flew the first Spacelab mission STS-9. In the second ESA selection in 1992 Thomas Reiter was selected.

For the first (then-West) German sponsored Spacelab mission D-1, Reinhard Furrer and Ernst Messerschmid were selected in 1983. Both flew again on STS-61-A in 1985.

The astronaut team was established in 1987, as part of the preparation for the second West German-sponsored Spacelab mission, D-2.

== Team members ==
The team initially consisted of 5 astronaut candidates:

- Renate Brümmer
- Hans Schlegel
- Gerhard Thiele
- Heike Walpot
- Ulrich Walter

For a German mission to the space station Mir, two cosmonauts were selected in 1990 (a few days after the reunification of West and East Germany), and added to the German team:

- Klaus-Dietrich Flade
- Reinhold Ewald

Flade flew on Soyuz TM-14 in 1992, Schlegel and Walter on STS-55 in 1993. Ewald flew on a second Mir mission on Soyuz TM-25 in February 1997. Brümmer and Walpot did not fly on any missions.

== Transition to European Corps ==
The team began to merge with the unified ESA Astronaut Corps in 1998, when Thiele and Schlegel joined the Corps. Ewald joined in 1999. Thiele flew on space shuttle mission STS-99, and Schlegel flew his second mission STS-122 in 2008.

== See also ==
- European Astronaut Corps
- German space programme
- List of German astronauts
