= List of German astronauts =

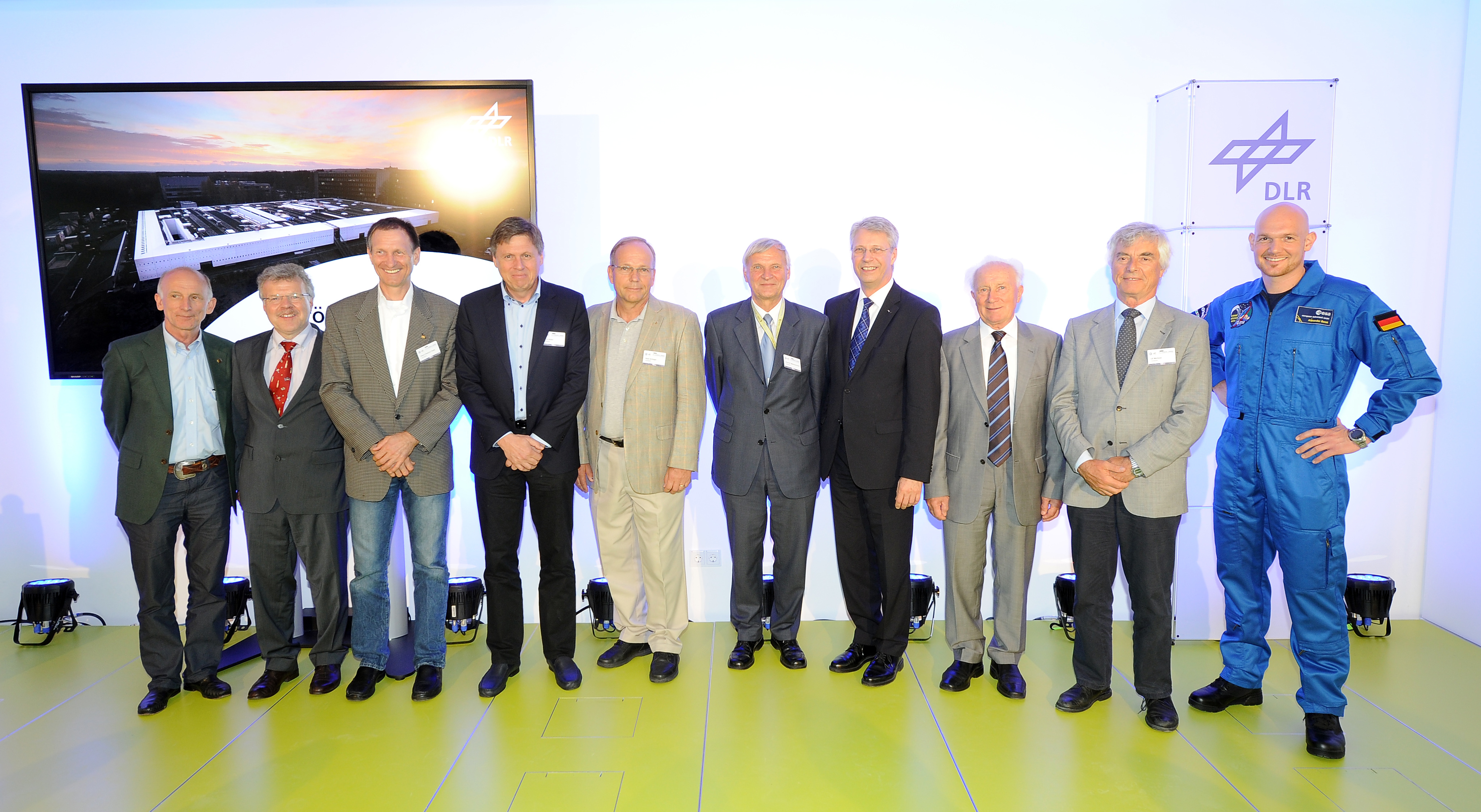
10 German astronauts together in a picture. From left to right: Gerhard Thiele (SRTM/STS-99), Reinhold Ewald (Mir'97), Klaus-Dietrich Flade (Mir'92), Ulrich Walter (D2), Hans Schlegel (D2, Columbus), Ernst Messerschmid (D1), Thomas Reiter (Euromir 95, Astrolab), Sigmund Jähn (Saljut 6), Ulf Merbold (STS-9, STS-42, Euromir 94) and ESA astronaut Alexander Gerst

The following is a list of German astronauts who have traveled into space, sorted by date of first flight.

As of 2024, twelve Germans have been in space. The first German, and only East German, in space was Sigmund Jähn in 1978. Three astronauts – Ulf Merbold, Reinhard Furrer and Ernst Messerschmid – represented West Germany during the time of divided Germany.

Merbold made two other spaceflights after Germany was reunified in 1990. He is the only German to have been in space three times.

== List ==
Image	Name	Mission	Mission start	Mission duration	Space station	Mission objectives
	Sigmund Jähn	Soyuz 31 / Soyuz 29	August 26, 1978	7 days	Salyut 6	Scientific experiments in Salyut 6
	Ulf Merbold	STS-9	November 28, 1983	10 days		Scientific experiments in the Spacelab Module
	Ulf Merbold	STS-42	January 22, 1992	8 days		Scientific experiments in the Spacelab Module
	Ulf Merbold	Soyuz TM-20 / Soyuz TM-19	October 3, 1994	31 days	Mir	
	Reinhard Furrer	STS-61-A (D1)	October 30, 1985	7 days		Scientific experiments in the Spacelab Module, deployment of the Global Low Orbiting Message Relay Satellite (GLOMR)
	Ernst Messerschmid	STS-61-A (D1)	October 30, 1985	7 days		Scientific experiments in the Spacelab Module, deployment of GLOMR
	Klaus-Dietrich Flade	Soyuz TM-14 / Soyuz TM-13	March 17, 1992	7 days	Mir	
	Hans Schlegel	STS-55 (D2)	April 26, 1993	9 days		Scientific experiments in the Spacelab Module
	Hans Schlegel	STS-122	February 7, 2008	12 days	ISS	Installation of the Columbus Orbital Facility
	Ulrich Walter	STS-55 (D2)	April 26, 1993	9 days		Scientific experiments in the Spacelab Module
	Thomas Reiter	Soyuz TM-22 / Euromir 95	September 3, 1995	179 days	Mir	
	Thomas Reiter	STS-121 / Expedition 13 / Expedition 14 / STS-116	July 4, 2006	171 days	ISS	
	Reinhold Ewald	Soyuz TM-25 / Soyuz TM-24	February 10, 1997	19 days	Mir	
	Gerhard Thiele	STS-99	February 11, 2000	11 days		Shuttle Radar Topography Mission, positioning of several satellites
	Alexander Gerst	Soyuz TMA-13M / Expedition 40 / Expedition 41	May 28, 2014	165 days	ISS	
	Alexander Gerst	Soyuz MS-09 / Expedition 56 / Expedition 57	June 6, 2018	197 days	ISS	
	Matthias Maurer	SpaceX Crew-3 / Expedition 66 / Expedition 67	November 10, 2021	190 days	ISS	
	Rabea Rogge	Fram2	April 1, 2025	4 days		Space Tourist. First German women and first crewed spaceflight to enter a polar retrograde orbit, i.e., to fly over Earth's poles.

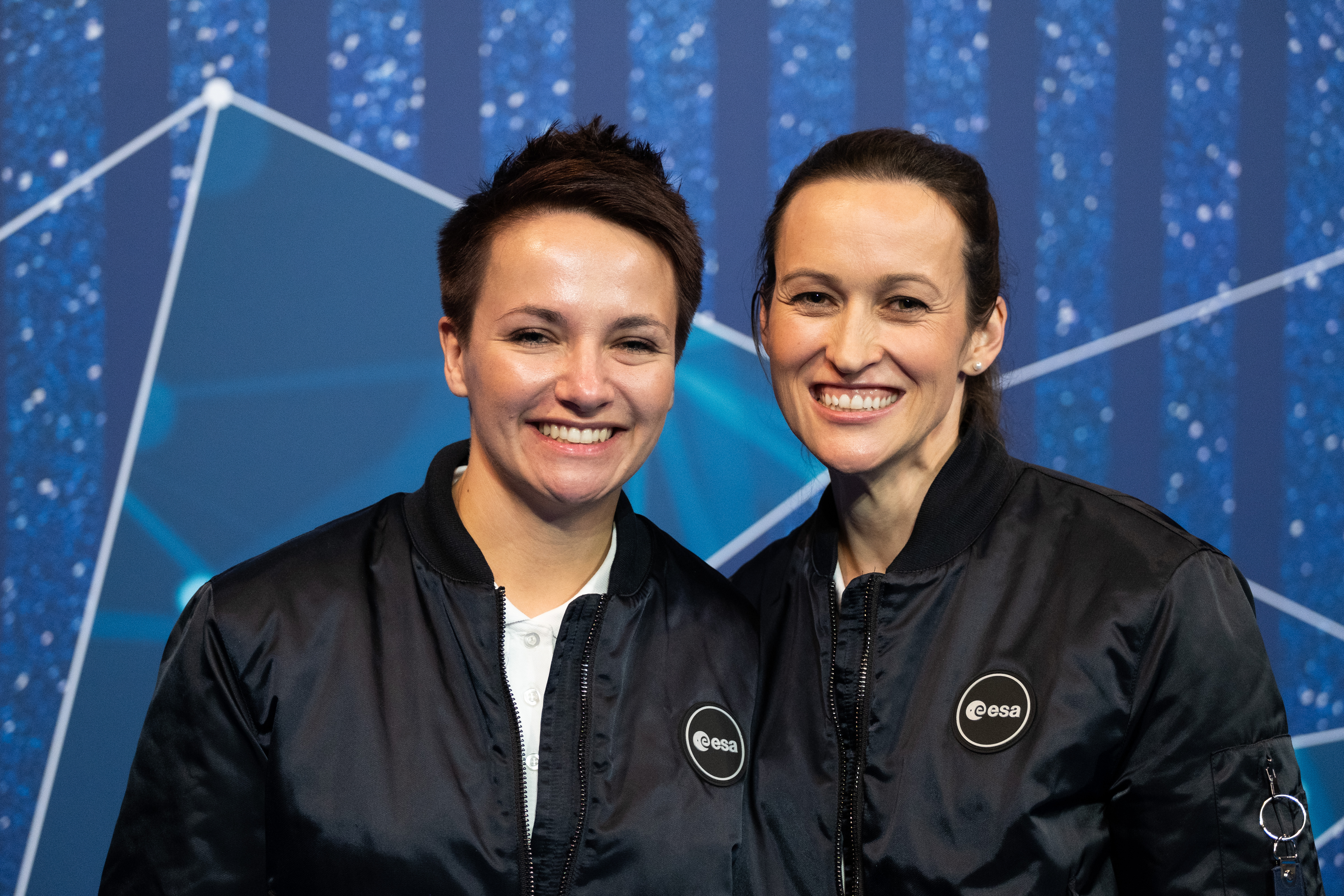
Schoenenwald and Winter

Amelie Schoenenwald and Nicola Winter were selected in the reserve corps of the 2022 European Space Agency Astronaut Group. They are the first women to be selected as astronauts representing Germany, though Rogge became the first German women in space.

== See also ==
- German space programme
- Die Astronautin
