= Ockels =

Ockels may refer to:

- Marjet Ockels (1943–2016), Dutch politician
- Wubbo Ockels (1946–2014), Dutch physicist
- 9496 Ockels, asteroid
