= Heike John =

Pilot, former spaceflight candidate, former swimmer

Personal information
- Born: 19 June 1960 (age 66) Düsseldorf, West Germany
- Height: 1.76 m (5 ft 9 in)
- Weight: 67 kg (148 lb)

Sport
- Sport: Swimming
- Club: Wasserfreunde Weisweiler, Eschweiler
Medal record
Women's swimming
Representing West Germany
European Championships
Bronze medal – third place	1977 Jönköping	4×100 m medley

Heike John (now Heike Walpot; born 19 June 1960) is a German retired swimmer and former astronaut candidate.

She won a bronze medal at the 1977 European Aquatics Championships. She competed at the 1976 Summer Olympics in the 100 m and 200 m backstroke events but did not reach the finals. During her career she won five national titles in the 100 m (1977) and 200 m (1977, 1978) backstroke and 200 m medley (1977, 1978). She missed the 1980 Summer Olympics because of their boycott by West Germany.

After her swimming career, she studied medicine at RWTH Aachen and earned a doctorate in 1987. In the same year she was selected as one of five West German astronaut candidates for the Spacelab D-2 mission, along with Hans Schlegel, Ulrich Walter, Gerhard Thiele and Renate Brümmer. She served as Cap com during the D-2 mission in 1993, but was never assigned to a spaceflight herself. After retiring as an astronaut, she became a professional pilot for Lufthansa in 1996 and retired as a Senior First Officer in the Boeing 747 fleet in the mid 2010s. She is married to astronaut Hans Schlegel.
