= University of Missouri College of Engineering =

- Type: Public
- Established: 1859
- Dean: Marisa Chrysochoou
- Students: 3,204
- Undergraduates: 2,783
- Postgraduates: 421
- Location: Columbia, Missouri; 38°56′46″N 92°19′49″W
- Website: engineering.missouri.edu

The University of Missouri College of Engineering is one of the 19 academic schools and colleges of the University of Missouri, a public land-grant research university in Columbia, Missouri. The college, also known as Mizzou Engineering, has an enrollment of 3,204 students who are enrolled in 10 bachelor’s programs, nine master’s programs and seven doctorate programs. There are six academic departments within the College: Chemical and Biomedical Engineering; Civil and Environmental Engineering; Electrical Engineering and Computer Science; Industrial and Systems Engineering; Engineering and Information Technology; and Mechanical and Aerospace Engineering. The college traces its beginning to the first engineering courses taught west of the Mississippi River in 1849. The college was ranked 88th nationally by the U.S. News & World Report in 2016.

== History ==
=== 1849-1979: Early courses and department ===
In 1849, the University of Missouri offered the first collegiate engineering course west of the Mississippi River – a civil engineering course focusing on "Surveying, Levelling and Classical Topography," taught by the university's acting president, William Wilson Hudson. Hudson would go on to become the first chair of civil engineering in 1856, and the Board of Curators’ officially would create a School of Civil Engineering in 1859 before losing it in an organizational reshuffling in 1860.

The Morrill Land-Grant Acts, the first of which passed in 1862 and accepted by the State of Missouri the following year, provided space for institutions with specialties in agriculture and engineering. By the end of the 1860s, the University of Missouri had departments of civil and military engineering, and in 1871, the School of Engineering was incorporated by the College of Agriculture as a special department before separating into its own institution in 1877 with Thomas J. Lowry as its first dean. The building that eventually would become the current Thomas and Nell Lafferre Hall was constructed in 1893, giving the college its own home.

The college continued to hit landmarks and expand throughout the years, including seeing its first female graduate, Ada Wilson, in 1907, and the creation of the Engineering Library in 1906. Thomas Edison gave the university an electric dynamo and incandescent lamps in 1882, and in 1885, the college created a department of electrical engineering. Mechanical engineering came next in 1891. Chemical engineering debuted as a department in 1903, industrial and manufacturing systems engineering in 1958 and nuclear engineering in 1964.

=== 1980-2019: Addition of IT and Department Mergers ===
Computer science moved from the University of Missouri College of Arts and Science to Engineering in 1995, with the Information Technology program launching in 2005.

James Thompson stepped down as dean of the University of Missouri College of Engineering on September 1, 2014, after being in the role for around 20 years. While he had been dean, the college stated it had added new programs in bioengineering, computer science, and IT, and the General Assembly approved the funds to renovate Lafferre Hall. There had also been some controversy in 2012 about merging with the Nuclear Science and Engineering Institute. On August 15, 2015, the university and the College of Engineering announced the hiring of the college's 11th full-time dean, Elizabeth Loboa, who previously served as associate chair and professor of the Joint Department of Biomedical Engineering at University of North Carolina-Chapel Hill and North Carolina State University, and a professor of materials science and engineering at North Carolina State. Loboa began her tenure on October 15 as the first female dean in the history of the college. Mizzou Engineering was one of fewer than 65 engineering colleges in the United States with a female dean as of 2018.

In 2017, the Department of Electrical and Computer Engineering and Department of Computer Science were merged to form the Department of Electrical Engineering and Computer Science. In 2018, MU became the first public university in the state to offer a degree in biomedical engineering. That same year, Mizzou Engineering combined its focus on bioengineering and chemical engineering fields by merging the Department of Bioengineering and Department of Chemical Engineering to form the Department of Biomedical, Biological and Chemical Engineering, overseen by both College of Engineering and the College of Agriculture, Food and Natural Resources.

== Academics ==
As of the end of the 2017-18 academic year, the MU College of Engineering had a total enrollment of 3,207 students — 2,724 undergraduates, 190 masters students and 283 doctoral candidates. The average freshman ACT score for College of Engineering students was 29.2. For the 2017-18 academic year, total scholarship money totaled more than $1.3 million. The average starting salary for a Mizzou Engineering alumnus was $61,315 as of 2018. The college's 10 undergraduate degree programs had their ABET accreditation renewed in 2018.

More than 50 student organizations and design teams are affiliated with the college, several of which regularly win awards and accolades either from the University of Missouri or their national chapters.

=== Degrees ===
In 2016, Mizzou Engineering offered degrees in 10 undergraduate, eight masters and seven doctoral programs. The undergraduate degree programs were:

- Bioengineering
- Biomedical engineering
- Chemical engineering
- Civil engineering
- Computer engineering
- Computer science
- Electrical engineering
- Industrial engineering
- Information technology
- Mechanical engineering

Graduate degrees are awarded in the following disciplines:

- Bioengineering
- Chemical Engineering
- Civil & Environmental Engineering
- Computer Science
- Electrical & Computer Engineering
- Industrial Manufacturing & Systems Engineering
- Mechanical & Aerospace Engineering
- Data Science & Analytics

Mizzou Engineering will begin offering a fully online master's degree in both bioengineering and industrial engineering and a bachelor's degree in information technology beginning in 2019, and the college offers online courses in various disciplines.

== Research ==
In 2016, Mizzou Engineering has raised its number of awarded research grants by 32%, including grants from the National Science Foundation, National Institutes of Health, Department of Energy, Department of Defense and many more.

== Faculty and alumni ==
The total amount of faculty is 113, and the college has more than 38,000 living alumni, more than 500 of which currently serve as owners, presidents or CEOs of companies in industry.

=== Deans ===
- James Thompson (August 1994 to September 1, 2014)
- Robert Schwartz - interim dean (2014 until November 4, 2015)
- Elizabeth Loboa - 11th Dean (October 15, 2015 to May 2020)
- Noah Manring - 12th Dean (May 1, 2020 to September 15, 2023)
- Praveen Edara - interim dean (September 18, 2023 to July 31, 2024)
- Marisa Chrysochoou - 13th Dean (August 1, 2024 – )

=== Notable staff ===
- Steven Nagel (died 2014) - former NASA astronaut, he joined the University Of Missouri College of Engineering as an instructor in the Mechanical and Aerospace Engineering Department in 2011
- William Carson - professor emeritus

=== Alumni ===
Alumni of the college include the following:

- Mike Brown - Euronet Worldwide chairman, president and CEO
- Peggy Cherng - Panda Express co-founder, No. 12 on Forbes’ 2016 “America’s Richest Self-Made Women”
- Steve Edwards - Black & Veatch CEO, 2015 Kansas City Business Journal Power 100
- Jim Fitterling - Dow Chemical Company president and COO of the Materials Science Division of DowDuPont
- David Haffner - Leggett & Platt CEO and chairman (retired)
- Martin Heinrich - U.S. Senator for New Mexico
- Kelly King - AT&T president of mobility and consumer market for south central U.S.
- Ray Kowalik - Burns & McDonnell CEO, 2016 Kansas City Business Journal Power 100
- Thompson Lin - Applied Optoelectronics Inc. founder, chairman and CEO
- Michael Melton - TME Enterprises president and CEO
- Jim O’Neill - The Boeing Co. president of defense space and security development and St. Louis senior executive (retired)
- Daniel O’Shaughnessy - mission systems engineer position at Johns Hopkins University’s applied physics lab for the NASA MESSENGER program
- Christine Pierson - NexGen Technology Solutions managing partner
- Rodger O. Riney - Scottrade Inc. founder, owner, president and CEO, named to Forbes’ 2016 “America’s Best Mid-Size Employers” list
- William F. Baker - structural engineering partner at Skidmore, Owings & Merrill LLP
- David D. Casey - co-founder of Garmin International, Inc. (retired)
- Jeffrey Davis - chairman, president and CEO at Perficient, Inc.
- William S. Thompson - CEO of Pacific Investment Management (retired)
- Amit Midha - president, Asia Pacific and Japan Commercial at Dell EMC
- Mohsen Sohi - CEO, speaker of the Management Board at Freudenberg & Co.

== Events and student life ==
=== Engineers' Week ===
The tradition of celebrating St. Patrick as the patron Saint of engineers began at Mizzou Engineering. From its beginnings the tradition spread to the offshoot of the university that eventually became the Missouri University of Science and Technology. Today, it is celebrated on campuses nationwide. The concept began at the University of Missouri with the "discovery" that St. Patrick was an engineer in 1903. As former dean Huber O. Croft wrote in "A Brief History of the College of Engineering – University of Missouri-Columbia":

It was on a warm spring day in March 1903 — perhaps as the result of a severe case of spring fever — that the students decided an unbearably long period stretched between officially authorized holidays. They therefore declared their own holiday on St. Patrick's Day, March 17. It was on this day that the whimsical "discovery" was made (or perhaps it should be called a useful invention) that Erin Go Bragh ("Ireland Forever"), somewhat loosely translated, meant "St. Patrick was an Engineer." Thenceforth, the good saint became the patron saint of all engineers. To corroborate St. Pat's engineerhood, he was later credited in song with inventing the "switch" (to "switch" the snakes out of Ireland), the "worm drive" and the "calculus" for engineers to cuss.

By 1905, the event grew to include a parade and kowtow to a student dressed as St. Patrick, the latter a tradition that continues to this day. Several lasting traditions of Engineers’ Week began by 1906, including the Engineer's Song, St. Patrick's Ball, the knighting ceremony, and the discovery of the "Blarney Stone." Since the early days, Engineers’ Week has grown to include the green tea ceremony, lighting the dome of Jesse Hall green, the tradition of knight candidates being required to carry large, ornate shillelaghs at all times, and more. St. Patrick and the shamrock have become symbols of the MU College of Engineering, and legend has it that anyone who walks across the shamrock painted in the courtyard of Lafferre Hall is destined to one day marry an engineer.

== Buildings ==
Thomas and Nell Lafferre Hall is the main building of the MU College of Engineering, with F. Robert and Patricia Naka Hall and Engineering Building North providing additional classroom, laboratory and office space. Lafferre Hall has been named for College of Engineering alumnus Thomas Lafferre and his wife, Nell, since 2004. The original buildings that provide the foundation of what is now Lafferre Hall were built in 1892 and 1893, with additions constructed in 1935, 1944, 1958, 1991 and 2009. In 2014, the State of Missouri's Board of Public Buildings — Governor Jay Nixon, Lieutenant Governor Peter Kinder and Attorney General Chris Koster — approved $38.5 million in bonds issued by the Missouri General Assembly for renovations and repairs to Lafferre Hall. Demolition of the 1935 and 1944 sections of the building began in May 2015, and the project was expected to be finished by December 2016. The renovation was to "allow for space to accommodate student competition teams, student conference rooms and study spaces on the main floor, alongside expanded laboratory space to better accommodate research. The building's various additions will be connected, and the project will make the entire building accessible according to the guidelines set forth by the Americans with Disabilities Act." The college held a ribbon cutting for the newly-renovation section of the building in December 2016.

Naka Hall, formerly Engineering Building West, was renamed for College of Engineering alumnus F. Robert Naka and his wife, Patricia, in 2016. Naka is considered the father of stealth technology and was a former Chief Scientist of the United States Air Force.

== Rankings ==
- U.S. News & World Report's Best Engineering Schools: #88 (2017)
