= Reinhard Furrer =

German physicist and astronaut (1940–1995)

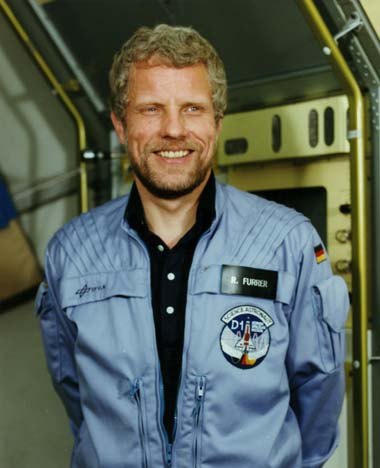
- Born: 25 November 1940; Wörgl, Nazi Germany (now Austria)
- Died: 9 September 1995 (aged 54); Berlin, Germany
- Occupation: Physicist
- Space career

DFVLR astronaut
- Time in space: 7d 00h 44m
- Selection: 1982 German Group
- Missions: STS-61-A

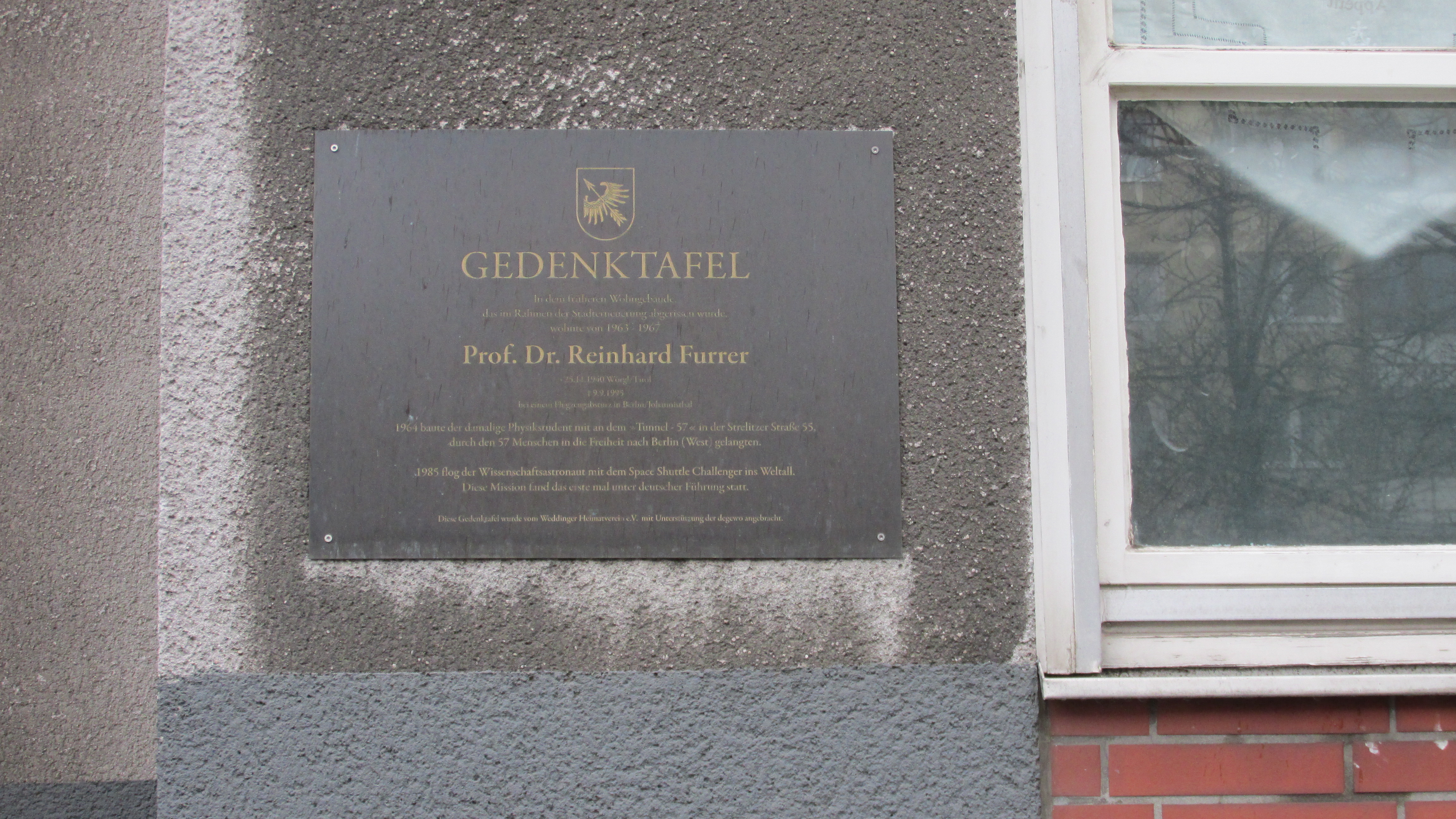
Memorial plaque to Dr. Reinhard Furrer, at his former residence, Brunnenstraße 135, Berlin

Reinhard Alfred Furrer (25 November 1940 – 9 September 1995) was a German physicist and astronaut.

Furrer was born in Wörgl, Ostmark (now Austria). After the end of World War II, his father was expelled from Austria. The family found a new home in Kempten im Allgäu, Bavaria. Furrer stayed there until he joined the University of Kiel to study physics. He later transferred to the Free University of Berlin, where he received a diploma in 1969, and a doctorate in 1972. During his time as a student in Berlin, he was involved in the building of the 145-metre-long (476 ft) "Tunnel 57" below the Berlin Wall, which was the escape route of 57 people from East Berlin to the West.

In 1974 he became assistant professor in Stuttgart and in 1979 qualified for full professorship. He spent time during 1980–1981 at the University of Chicago and during 1981 at the Argonne National Laboratory in Chicago, US.

In 1977 Furrer applied for selection as an astronaut for the first Spacelab mission. He made it into the final round of candidates, although Ulf Merbold was finally selected. In 1982, the astronauts for the first German Spacelab mission were selected from the finalists for the first mission, and Furrer was one of the two chosen. He was a payload specialist on STS-61-A (D1), which was launched on 30 October 1985. The other payload specialists on the flight were Ernst Messerschmid and Wubbo Ockels (Netherlands).

Furrer wore the Sinn (watchmaker) model 140 S on his wrist during the STS-61-A mission in 1985.

After his spaceflight he became a professor in 1987 as well as the director of the Institute of Space Sciences at the Free University of Berlin.

Furrer was an avid pilot. He earned his pilot license in 1974, doing several long-distance trips with one-engine planes - including a flight over the inland ice of Greenland in 1979 and a solo flight from Germany to Quito, Ecuador in 1981. His love for planes finally cost him his life, as he died in a plane crash after a flight show on the Johannisthal Air Field (Berlin). He was a passenger of pilot Gerd Kahdemann in a historic Bf 108 when the plane crashed shortly after 6:00 p.m. after performing a roll at low altitude. Both Kahdemann and Furrer were killed instantly.

== Checkpoint Charlie Museum ==
From the files of the GDR State Security Service: Concerning FURRER it is known that, as a member of the Arbeitsgemeinschaft 13 August e.V. Association (supporting association of the Checkpoint Charlie Museum), he was a close personal friend of the chairman of the anti communism organisation and former head of the "Action Group against Inhumanity" Rainer Hildebrandt. Besides his usual code name "Kurt Jacob" he was also known under the aliases "Reinhard", "Jens", "Heino", "Nikolai" and "Bartmann"... A permanent exhibition, dedicated to Furrer was opened in the Checkpoint Charlie Museum.
