= Renate Brümmer =

Swiss-born German meteorological scientist and astronaut

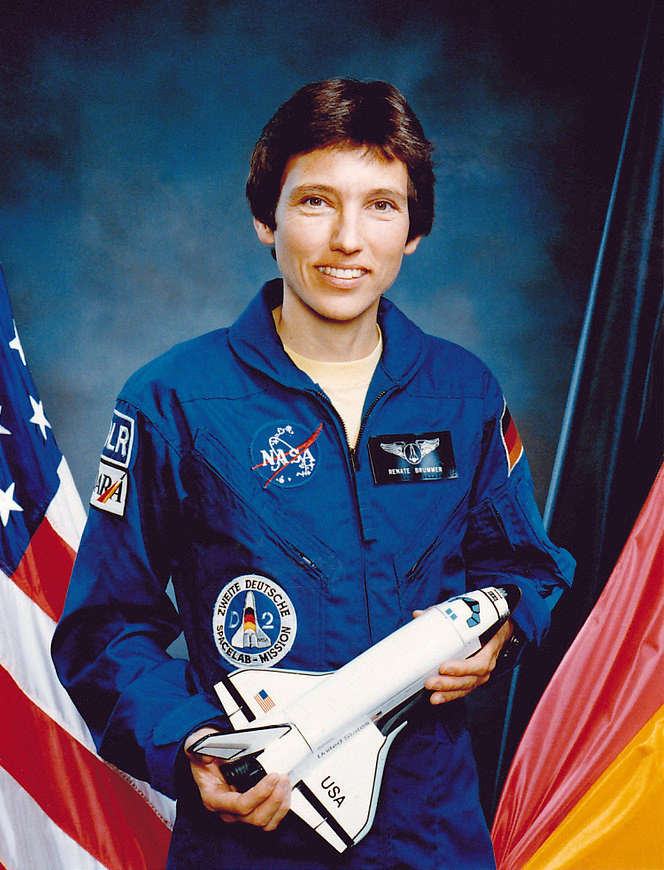
- Born: Renate Luise Brümmer; 4 May 1955 (age 71); St. Gallen, Switzerland
- Occupations: Scientist, astronaut
- Space career
- Selection: German astronaut team (1987)
- Mission: STS-55
- Retired: 6 May 1993

Academic background
- Education: LMU Munich; University of Miami (PhD)
- Thesis: On The Use Of Profiler Data In Limited-Area Numerical Weather Prediction (1986)

Academic work
- Discipline: Meteorology
- Institutions: University of Colorado Boulder, University Corporation for Atmospheric Research
- Scientific career
- Fields: Mesoscale forecast modeling, Satellite meteorology

Renate Luise Brümmer (born 4 May 1955) is a Swiss-born German meteorological scientist and former astronaut. Specialising in satellite meteorology, she was selected as an astronaut in 1987, retiring in 1993, having never been into space.

== Early life and education ==
Brümmer received the equivalent of a Master of Science degree in mathematics and physics from LMU Munich in 1981, and a Doctorate from the University of Miami in meteorology and physical oceanography in 1986.

She had previously qualified as a schoolteacher and taught mathematics and physics at a secondary school. She also held a private pilot's license.^{:238}

== Space career ==
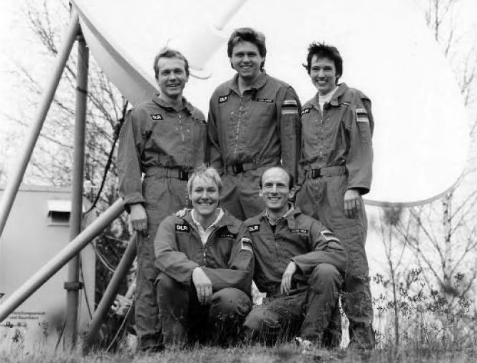
The German astronaut team in 1987; Brümmer is furthest right

The German Aerospace Center was due to select a group of German scientists to become astronauts for the Spacelab D2 missions in 1986, following the successful flights of Ulf Merbold in 1983 and 1985; this selection was postponed until 1987 after the Challenger disaster.^{:237–238} To select astronauts, a competition was run in 1986, and 1400 people applied; 20% were women.^{:279} Brümmer was one of the five people in the first selection to the German astronaut team on 3 August 1987, as a payload specialist.^{:237} Two of the selection were women, Brümmer and Heike Walpot, Germany's first women astronauts;^{:237} neither woman ever went to space.

Brümmer completed basic training by 1990 with the rest of the German team, then undertook further mission-specific training across Europe and the United States. The crew for NASA mission STS-55 was selected in early 1992, with Brümmer and Gerhard Thiele being made reserves and trained for both flight and mission control; Walpot was named a crew interface coordinator and only trained for mission control. As part of the Spacelab D2 group training in Cologne and planning to use the Space Shuttle in 1992, Brümmer was initially considered to fly on the Soviet Mir mission that had been scheduled for the same time, which instead went ahead as Soyuz TM-14 with mostly Russian astronauts and Germans selected after the first five.^{:224–225}

For STS-55, in 1993, she was a reserve astronaut and supported the flying astronauts from the Oberpfaffenhofen control centre during the mission; if she had flown, she would have been the first schoolteacher to orbit Earth.^{:238} The German astronaut team was disbanded later in 1993.^{:238}

== Later career ==
Brümmer is a professional meteorologist; she had been a research associate at the University of Colorado Boulder at the time of her astronaut selection.^{:237} After retiring as an astronaut, she returned to Boulder, Colorado, to become a researcher at the National Oceanic and Atmospheric Administration.^{:238}

She joined the University Corporation for Atmospheric Research (CIRA) in 1995 at Colorado-Boulder. Initially, she worked as part of the GLOBE Program and in running the FX-Net project to deliver forecasting interfaces over the Internet. In the 2010s, she began working as a coordinator for the Regional and Mesoscale Meteorology Branch, researching satellite applications.
