= Superbus (transport) =

2006–2020 Dutch electronic limo car project

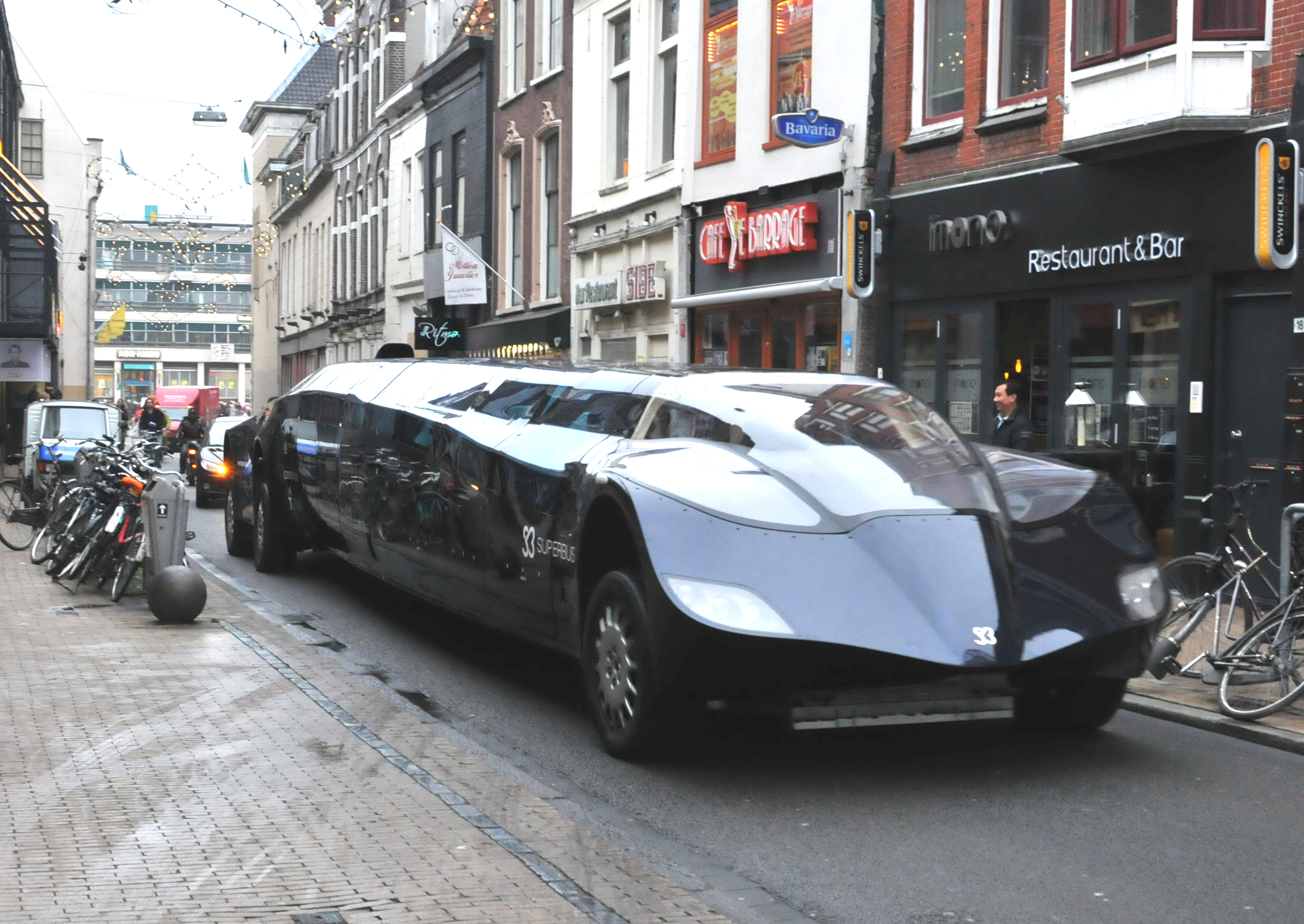
Superbus-II

The Superbus was a project lasting from 2006 to 2020 to create a prototype high speed electric coach-like limo car capable of carrying 23 passengers at speeds of up to 250 kilometres per hour (160 mph) on specially designed segregated highway lanes. The Superbus project, which had been led by Dutch astronaut professor Wubbo Ockels of the Delft University of Technology until his death in 2014 envisaged a comfortable, demand-dependent door-to-door transportation rivaling the car and the train. The project, which encompassed infrastructure, logistics, safety, reliability and economic viability, in addition to the design of the vehicle itself, received funding of €10 million, largely provided by the Dutch State.

== The vehicle ==
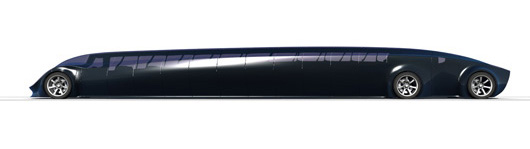
The 23 seater 250 km/h Superbus

The vehicle was a 15-metre-long electric vehicle with seating for 23 passengers accessible from 16 doors with a cruising speed of 250 kilometres per hour (160 mph) and a range of 215 kilometres (134 mi).

== Super lanes ==
The plan required the vehicle run on special 'super lanes' -- geothermically heated in order to prevent icing during cold weather, so the infrastructure costs would be significant.

== Logistics ==
Rather than following a timetable, the plan stated that vehicle will be routed in response to the needs of the particular passengers offering a complete journey without changes based on central routing optimization system.
