= Steven R. Nagel =

American test pilot, astronaut and engineer (1946–2014)

Steven Nagel
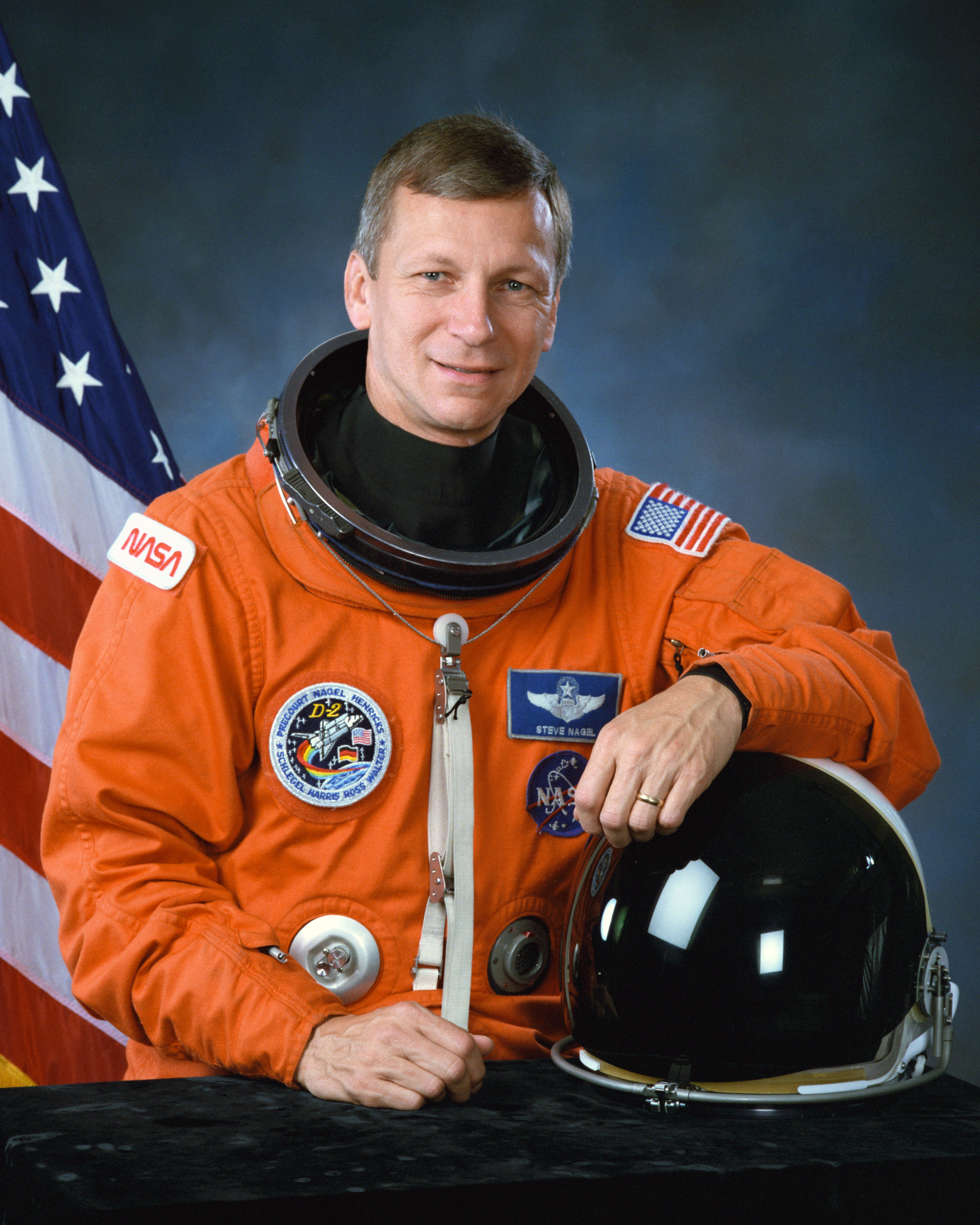
- Born: Steven Ray Nagel; October 27, 1946; Canton, Illinois, U.S.
- Died: August 21, 2014 (aged 67); Columbia, Missouri, U.S.
- Education: University of Illinois, Urbana-Champaign (BS); California State University, Fresno (MS)
- Spouse: Linda M. Godwin
- Awards: Distinguished Flying Cross
- Space career

NASA astronaut
- Rank: Colonel, USAF
- Time in space: 30d 1h 34m
- Selection: NASA Group 8 (1978)
- Missions: STS-51-G; STS-61-A; STS-37; STS-55
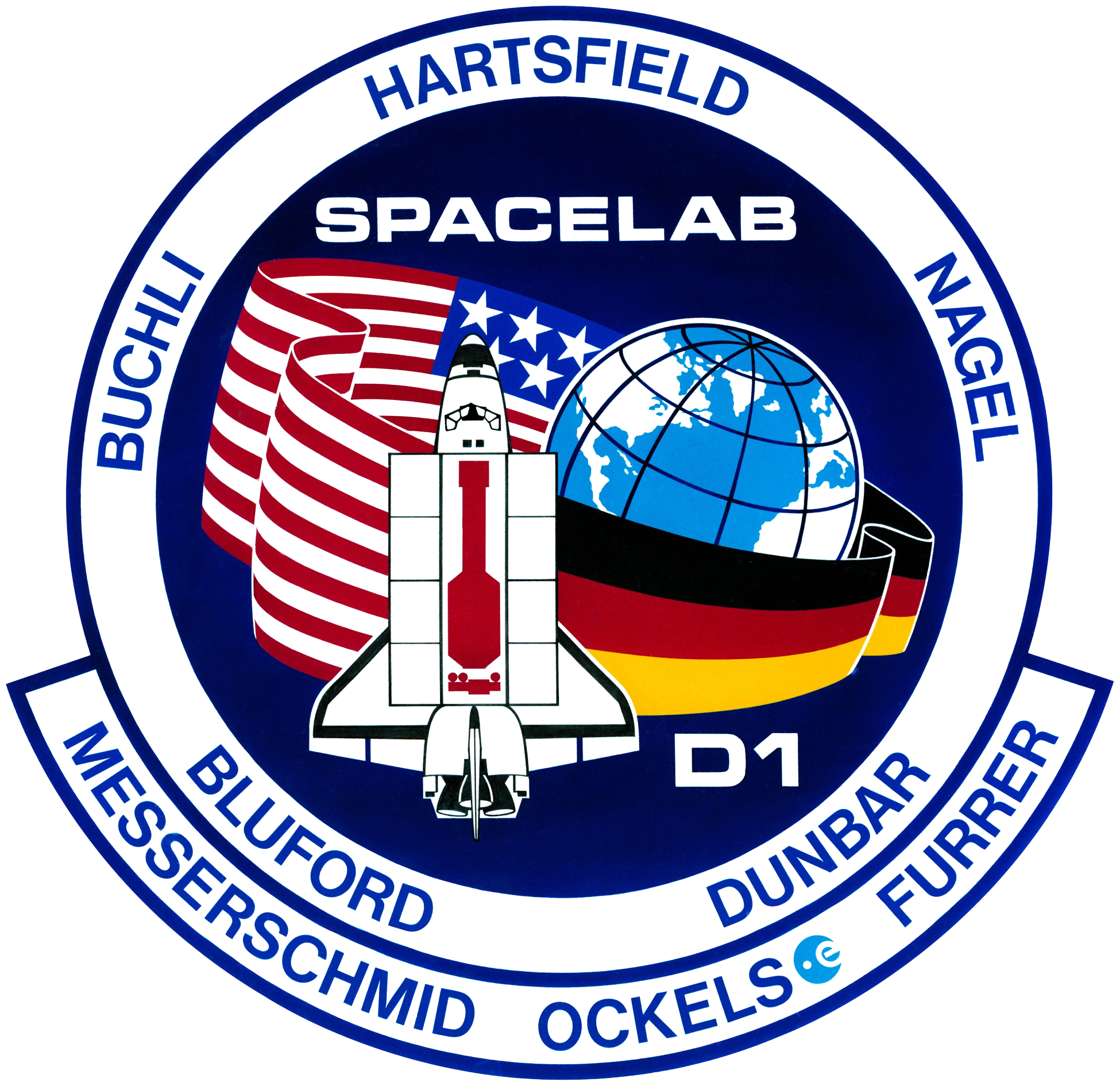
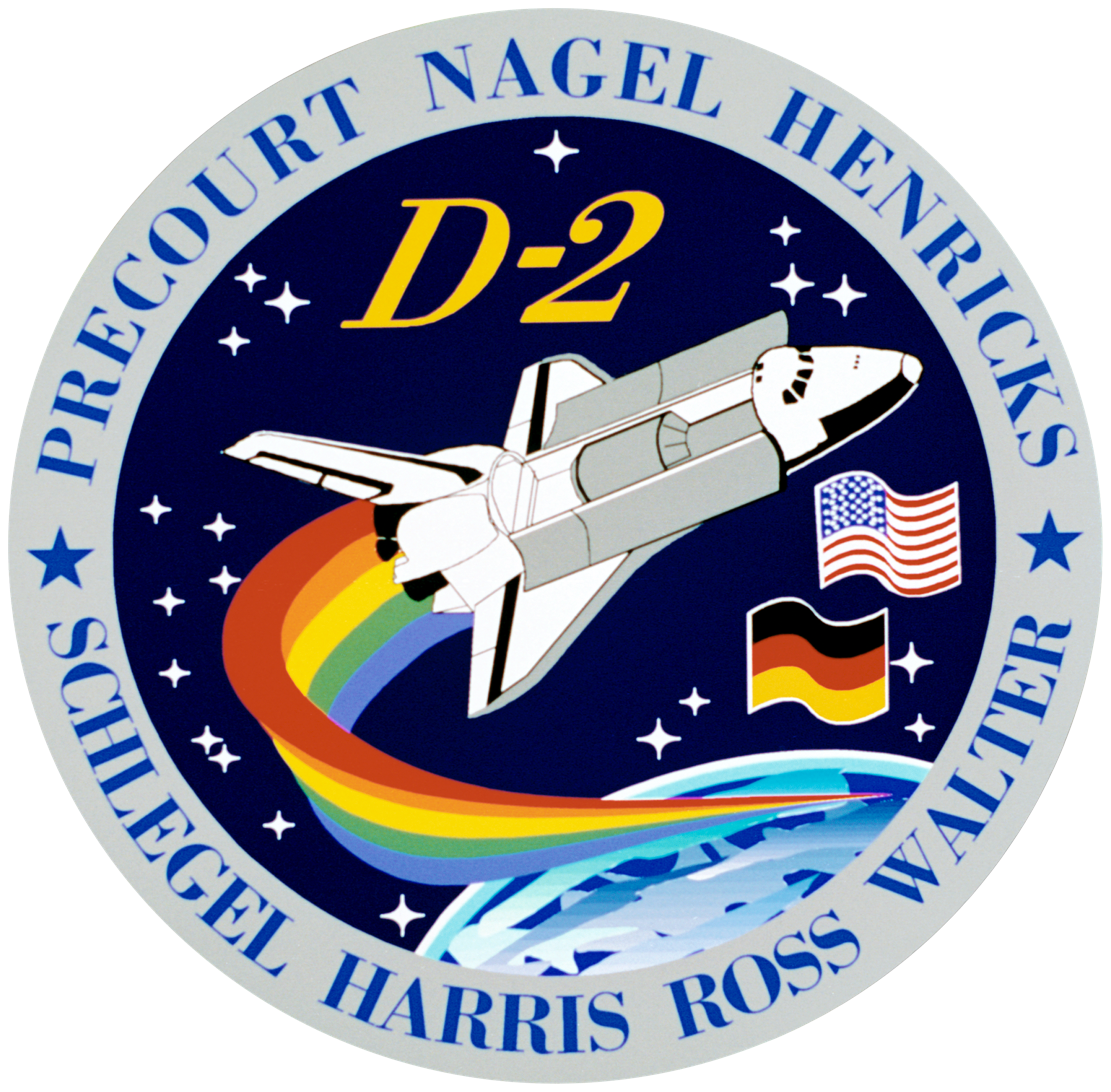
- Mission insignia
- Retired: February 28, 1995

Steven Ray Nagel (October 27, 1946 – August 21, 2014), (Col, USAF), was an American astronaut, aeronautical and mechanical engineer, test pilot, and a United States Air Force pilot. In total, he logged 723 hours in space. After NASA, he worked at the University of Missouri College of Engineering as an instructor in its Mechanical and Aerospace Engineering Department.

== Personal life ==
Nagel was born on October 27, 1946, in Canton, Illinois. He was married to fellow astronaut Linda M. Godwin of Jackson, Missouri. They had two daughters. His hobbies included sport flying, amateur radio operations and music. His wife's father, James M. Godwin, resides in Oak Ridge, Missouri.

== Education ==
Nagel graduated from Canton High School, Canton, Illinois, in 1964; received a Bachelor of Science degree in Aeronautical and Astronautical Engineering (high honors) from the University of Illinois in 1969, and a Master of Science degree in mechanical engineering from California State University, Fresno, in 1978.

== Flight experience ==
Nagel received his commission in 1969 through the Air Force Reserve Officer Training Corps (AFROTC) program at the University of Illinois. He completed Undergraduate Pilot Training at Laredo Air Force Base, Texas, in February 1970, and subsequently reported to Luke Air Force Base, Arizona, for F-100 training. From October 1970 to July 1971, Nagel was an F-100 pilot with the 68th Tactical Fighter Squadron at England Air Force Base, Louisiana. He served a 1-year tour of duty as a T-28 instructor for the Laotian Air Force at Udon RTAFB, Udon Thani, Thailand, prior to returning to the United States in October 1972 to assume A-7D instructor pilot and flight examiner duties at England Air Force Base, Louisiana.

Nagel attended the USAF Test Pilot School at Edwards Air Force Base, California, from February 1975 to December 1975. In January 1976, he was assigned to the 6512th Test Squadron located at Edwards. As a test pilot, he worked on various projects which included flying the F-4 and A-7D.

He logged 12,600 hours flying time—9,640 hours in jet aircraft.

== NASA career ==
Nagel became a NASA astronaut in August 1979. His technical assignments included: backup T-38 chase pilot for STS-1; support crew and backup entry spacecraft (CAPCOM) for STS-2; support crew and primary entry CAPCOM for STS-3; software verification at the Shuttle Avionics Integration Laboratory (SAIL) and the Flight Simulation Laboratory (FSL); representing the Astronaut Office in the development of a crew escape system for the Space Shuttle; Acting Chief of the Astronaut Office (1991). With the completion of his fourth flight, Nagel had logged a total of 723 hours in space. Nagel retired from the Air Force, effective February 28, 1995. He retired from the Astronaut Office, effective March 1, 1995, to assume the full-time position of deputy director for Operations Development, Safety, Reliability, and Quality Assurance Office, Johnson Space Center, Houston, Texas. In September 1996, Nagel transferred to Aircraft Operations Division where he performed duties as a Research Pilot. Nagel was a veteran of four space flights (STS-51-G and STS-61-A in 1985, STS-37 in 1991, and STS-55 in 1993) as described below:

=== Spaceflight experience ===
Nagel first flew as a mission specialist on STS-51G, which launched from the Kennedy Space Center, Florida, on June 17, 1985. The crew aboard the Shuttle Discovery deployed communications satellites for Mexico (Morelos), the Arab League (Arabsat), and the United States (AT&T Telstar). They used the Remote Manipulator System (RMS) to deploy and later retrieve the SPARTAN satellite which performed 17 hours of x-ray astronomy experiments while separated from the Space Shuttle. In addition, the crew activated the Automated Directional Solidification Furnace (ADSF), six "Getaway Specials," participated in biomedical experiments, and conducted a laser tracking experiment as part of the Strategic Defense Initiative. After completing approximately 170 hours of space flight, Discovery landed at Edwards Air Force Base, California, on June 24, 1985.

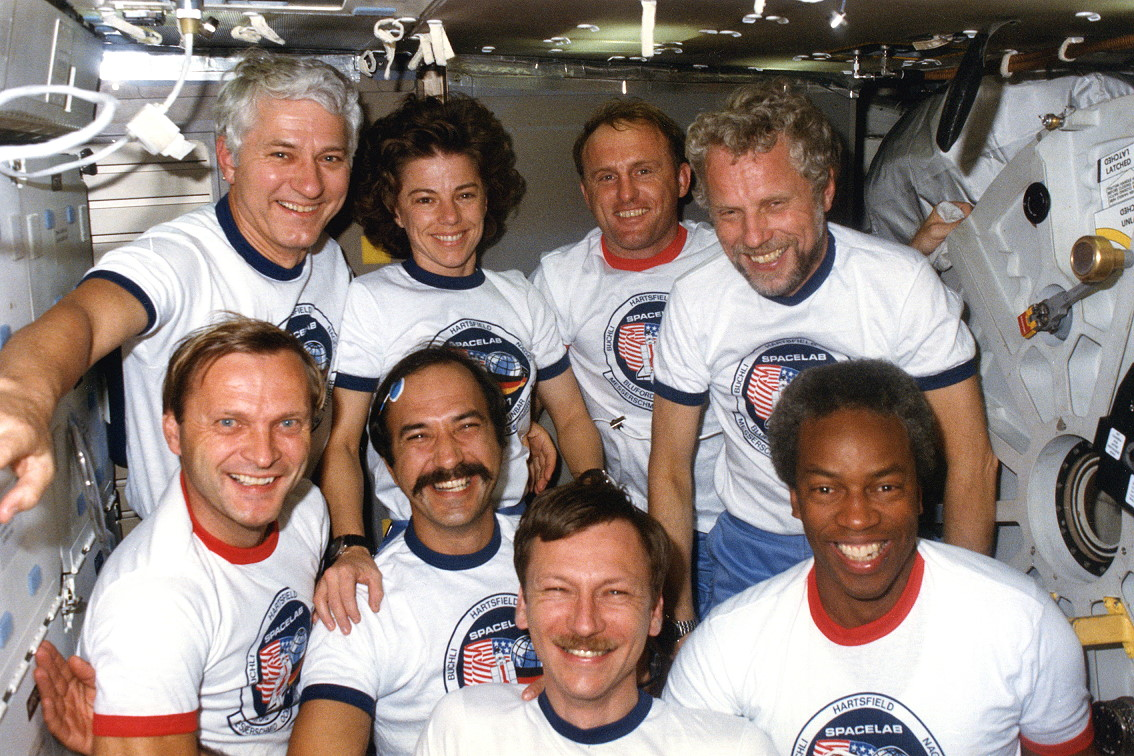
The crew of the STS-61-A mission. Nagel is in the middle on the bottom

Nagel then flew as pilot on STS-61A, the West German D-1 Spacelab mission, which launched from Kennedy Space Center, Florida, on October 30, 1985. This mission was the first in which payload activities were controlled from outside the United States. More than 75 scientific experiments were completed in the areas of physiological sciences, materials processing, biology, and navigation. After completing 111 orbits of the Earth, Shuttle Challenger landed at Edwards Air Force Base, California on November 6, 1985.

On his third flight, Nagel was commander of STS-37, which launched into orbit on April 5, 1991, from Kennedy Space Center, Florida, and landed on April 11, 1991, at Edwards Air Force Base, California. During this mission, the crew aboard the Shuttle Atlantis deployed the Compton Gamma Ray Observatory for the purpose of exploring gamma ray sources throughout the universe. The crew and conducted the first scheduled space walk in more than five and one-half years, and the first successful unscheduled spacewalk to free a stuck antenna on the satellite.

Nagel also served as commander of STS-55, the German D-2 Spacelab mission. After launching on April 26, 1993, on the Shuttle Columbia; the crew landed 10 days later on May 6, 1993, at Edwards Air Force Base, California. During the ambitious mission 89 experiments were performed in many disciplines such as materials processing, life sciences, robotics, technology, astronomy and earth mapping.

In total, he logged 723 hours in space.

== Post-NASA career ==
In 2011, Nagel and his wife Linda moved to Columbia, Missouri, where they both were teaching at the University of Missouri. Nagel was a retention specialist in the College of Engineering and instructor in the Mechanical and Aerospace Engineering Department, specializing in aerospace propulsion; Godwin was a professor in the physics department, specializing in astronomy.

Specifically he worked at the University of Missouri College of Engineering. There he served as an instructor in the university's Mechanical and Aerospace Engineering Department.

== Organizations ==
Life member of the Order of Daedalians and Alpha Delta Phi; and honorary member of Phi Eta Sigma, Sigma Tau, Tau Beta Pi, and Sigma Gamma Tau.

== Special honors ==
Awarded the Air Force Distinguished Flying Cross and the Air Medal with 7 Oak Leaf Clusters; and for Undergraduate Pilot Training, recipient of the Commander's Trophy, the Flying Trophy, the Academic Trophy, and the Orville Wright Achievement Award (Order of Daedalians); also presented the Air Force Meritorious Service Medal (1978).

Recipient of 4 NASA Space Flight Medals, (1985, 1991, 1993), NASA Exceptional Service Medals (1988, 1989), NASA Outstanding Leadership Medal (1992), AAS Flight Achievement Award, STS-37 Crew (1992), Outstanding Alumni Award (University of Illinois, 1992), NASA Distinguished Service Medal (1994), Distinguished Alumni Award (California State University, Fresno, 1994), Lincoln Laureate (State of Illinois, 1994).

== Death ==
Nagel died in Columbia, Missouri, from advanced melanoma on August 21, 2014. He was 67 years old.

== See also ==
- List of spaceflight records
