= Marjet Ockels =

Dutch politician (1943–2016)

Member of the House of Representatives
- In office 4 June 1991 – 17 May 1994

Personal details
- Born: 12 November 1943 Almelo, Netherlands
- Died: 14 May 2016 (aged 72) Zoutkamp, Netherlands
- Party: Labour Party (until 1993), Independent (after 1993)

Marjet Joan Ockels (12 November 1943 – 14 May 2016) was a Dutch politician. She was a member of the House of Representatives between 1991 and 1994. She started as member of the Labour Party, but left the party in 1993 and continued as an independent.

== Career ==
From 1966 until 1986, she worked at a general practice clinic. She was a member of the municipal council of Ulrum for the Labour Party between 3 September 1982 and 1 January 1990. From 29 April 1986 she concurrently served as alderwoman for education, social affairs, employment and fishery. Afterwards, she continued as a member of the municipal council of the expanded municipality of Ulrum, which later became the De Marne. Her time in office ended on 12 April 1994.

Ockels served in the House of Representatives from 4 June 1991 to 17 May 1994. On 21 September 1993 she left the Labour party and continued as an independent. She was discontent with the internal relations within the party. Fellow Labour Party MPs Frans Moor and Piet de Visser had left the party a year before, also citing internal party differences. For the 1994 Dutch general election she was the third candidate on the list of The New Party(De Nieuwe Partij); the party failed to obtain a seat in the House of Representatives.

== Personal life ==
Ockels was born on 12 November 1943 in Almelo.

Ockels died in Zoutkamp on 14 May 2016, aged 72. Her brother was astronaut Wubbo Ockels.
