= Elizabeth G. Loboa =

American engineer and academic administrator

Provost and Executive Vice Chancellor at University of Denver

Personal details
- Education: University of California, Davis (B.S.); Stanford University (M.S.) (Ph.D)

Elizabeth G. Loboa (born 1966) is an American biomedical engineer, inventor, and academic administrator. Loboa is currently Provost and Executive Vice Chancellor at the University of Denver. She joined the university in July 2025. Previously, she was dean of the College of Engineering at the University of Missouri from 2015 to 2020 and provost of Southern Methodist University (SMU) from 2020 to 2025. During her tenure at SMU, the university achieved Carnegie R1 Status, grew its enrollment, and invested heavily in supercomputing.

Loboa is a fellow of the American Association for the Advancement of Science.

== Education ==
Loboa received a bachelor's degree in mechanical engineering from the University of California, Davis in 1995, followed by a master's degree in biomechanical engineering in 1997 and a doctorate in mechanical engineering in 2002 from Stanford University.
