= Wubbo Ockels =

Dutch astronaut (1946–2014)

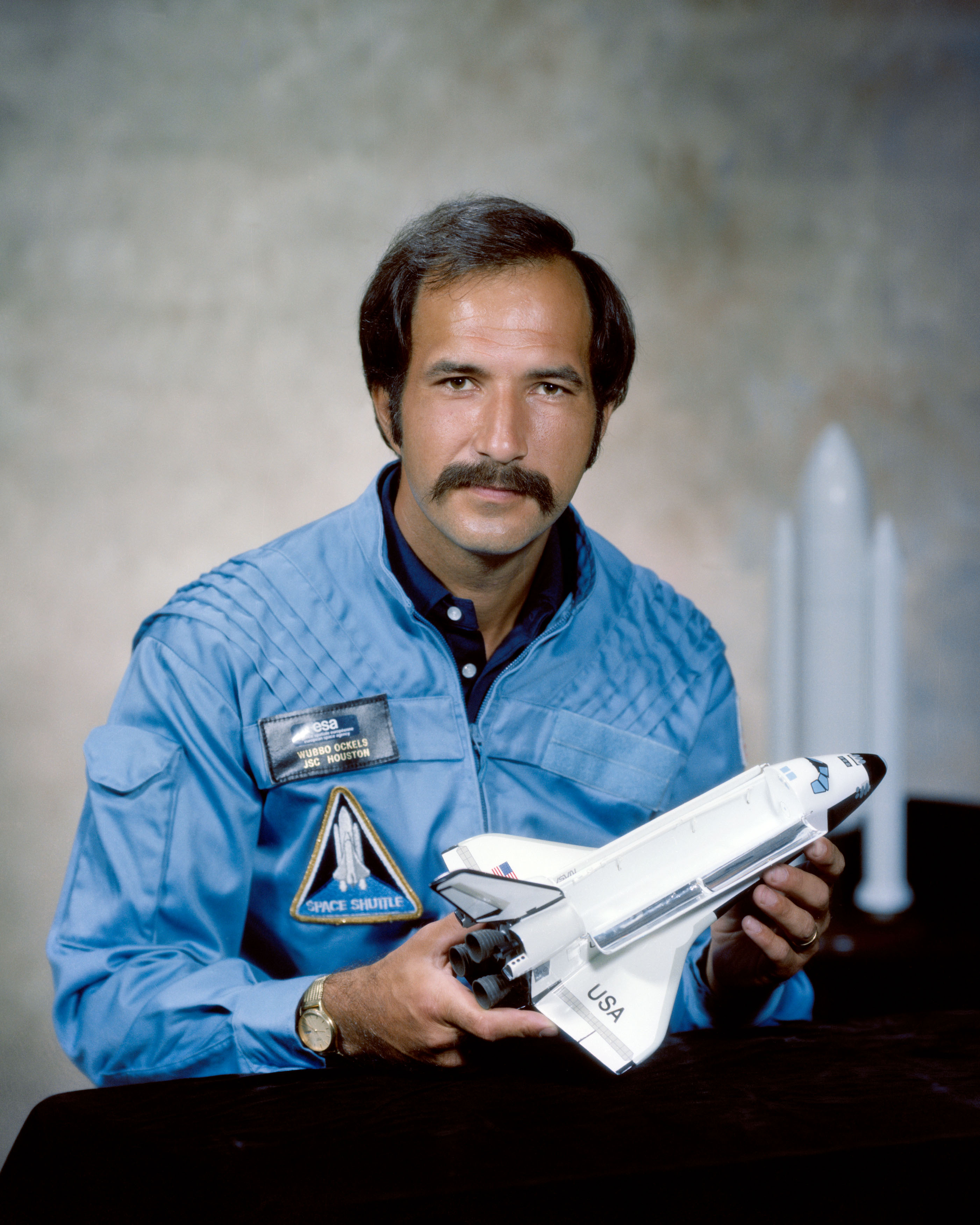
- NASA portrait of Ockels in 1981.
- Born: Wubbo Johannes Ockels; 28 March 1946; Almelo, Netherlands
- Died: 18 May 2014 (aged 68); Amsterdam, Netherlands
- Education: University of Groningen (MSc, PhD)
- Occupation: Physicist
- Spouse: Joos Swaving
- Children: 2
- Space career

ESA astronaut
- Time in space: 7 days, 44 minutes
- Selection: 1978 ESA Group
- Missions: STS-61-A

Wubbo Johannes Ockels (28 March 1946 – 18 May 2014) was a Dutch physicist and astronaut with the European Space Agency who, in 1985, became the first Dutch citizen in space when he flew on STS-61-A as a payload specialist. He later became professor of aerospace engineering at Delft University of Technology.

== Education and early life ==
Ockels was born in Almelo, Netherlands, but considered Groningen to be his hometown. He obtained his MSc degree in physics and mathematics in 1973 and subsequently a PhD degree in the same subjects in 1978 from the University of Groningen. His thesis was based on experimental work at the Nuclear-physics Accelerator Institute (KVI) in Groningen.

From 1973 to 1978, Ockels performed experimental investigations at the Nuclear Physics Accelerator Institute in Groningen. His work concerned the gamma-ray decay of nuclear systems directly after formation and the development of a data-handling system involving design of electronics and programming of real-time software. He also contributed to the design and construction of position-sensitive charged particle detectors. While at the K.V.I. Institute, Ockels supervised the practical work of first-year physics students at the University of Groningen.

== ESA career ==
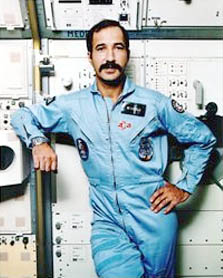
Wubbo Ockels as an astronaut

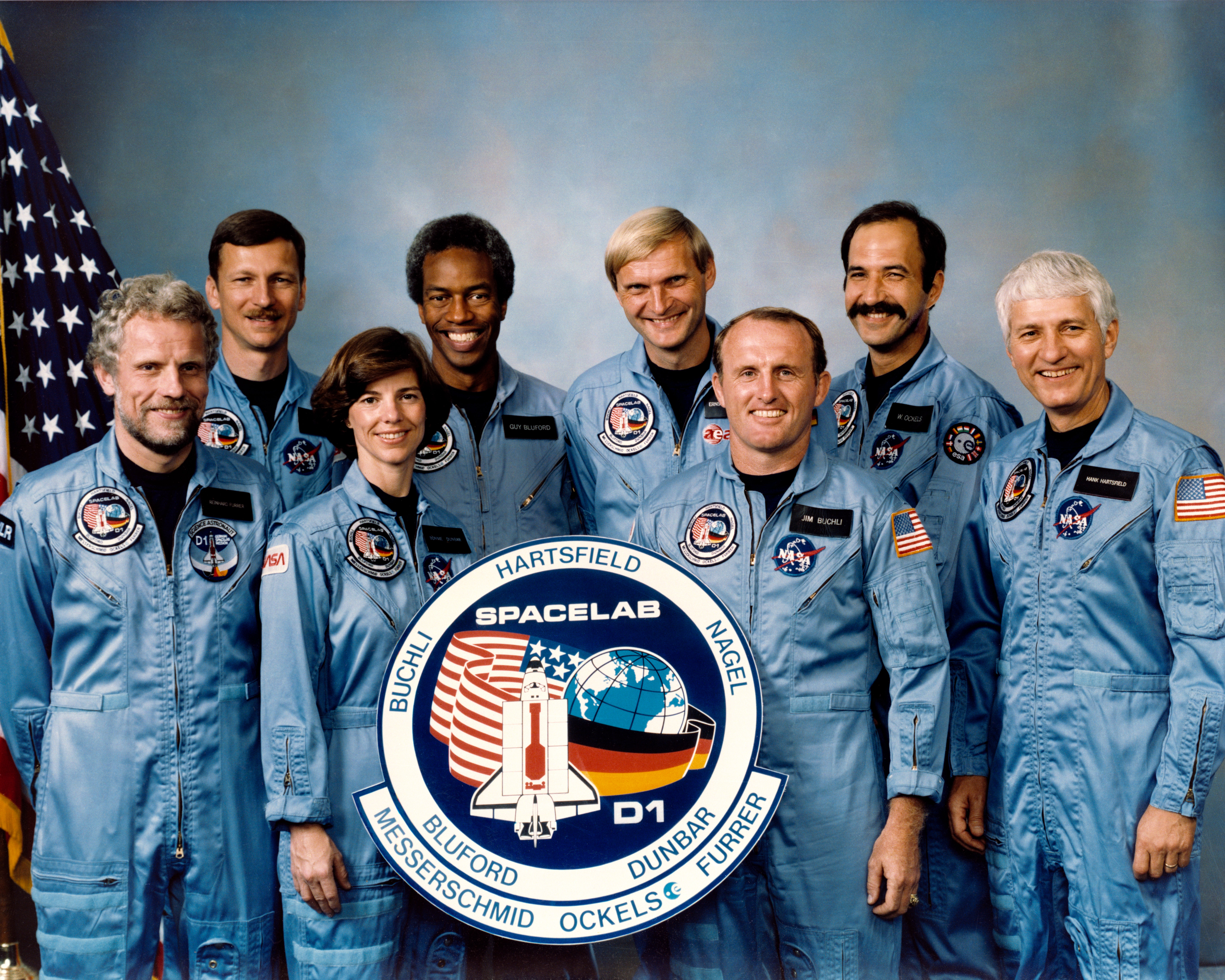
The STS-61-A crew with Ockels second from the right

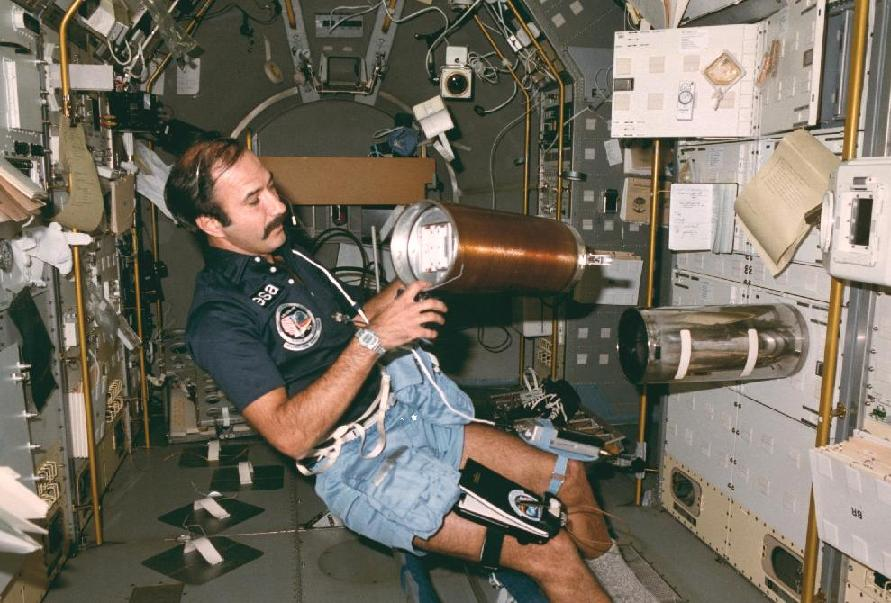
Ockels in Spacelab

In 1978, Ockels was selected by the European Space Agency (ESA) as one of three European payload specialists to train for the Spacelab 1 mission. In May 1980, under the terms of an agreement between ESA and NASA, Ockels and Swiss astronaut Claude Nicollier were selected to begin basic mission specialist training with the NASA astronaut candidates at NASA's Johnson Space Center, Houston, Texas.

In September 1981 Ockels withdrew from training to focus on Spacelab, and did not become a NASA mission specialist. He rejoined the Spacelab 1 crew for training as a back-up payload specialist to operate experiments. This mission of a reusable, scientific research facility built by the European Space Agency (ESA) took place aboard the Space Shuttle in November 1983. Spacelab 1 was a joint NASA/ESA mission. He was the first Dutch citizen astronaut, not the first Dutch-born astronaut, as he is preceded by the naturalized American Lodewijk van den Berg, who flew on STS-51-B. Having served his role as back-up payload specialist for German astronaut Ulf Merbold, he took his place in Mission Control in Houston as the primary communicator between the astronauts working in Spacelab and the Mission Management Team in Houston.

Ockels flew as a payload specialist on the crew of STS-61A Challenger (30 October to 6 November 1985). STS-61A was the West German D-1 Spacelab mission. It was the first to carry eight crew members, (five Americans, two Germans and Ockels); the largest to fly in space; and was also the first in which payload activities were controlled from outside the United States: from the DLR control center in Germany. More than 75 scientific experiments were completed in the areas of physiological sciences, materials science, biology, and navigation. At mission conclusion Ockels had traveled 2.5 million miles in 110 Earth orbits, and logged over 168 hours in space.

Ockels was a member of the American Physical Society and the European Physical Society. From 1999 to 2003, he was head of ESA's Office for Educational Projects Outreach Activities.

A minor planet was named after Wubbo Ockels by the International Astronomical Union. The asteroid orbits the Sun between Mars and Jupiter. The object's full name is 9496 Ockels.

== Scientific career ==
In 1992, Ockels was appointed part-time professor of aerospace engineering (in particular, Aerospace for Sustainable Engineering and Technology) at Delft University of Technology, and promoted to full-time professor in September 2003. In this function, he oversaw the Nuna projects. He also proposed the development of a Superbus, a new method of high speed (250 km/hour) public transportation by road. The public transportation company Connexxion was the first company to invest in the development of this Superbus.

The LadderMill is the response to the challenge for exploiting the gigantic energy source contained in the airspace up to high altitudes of 10 km. The concept has been developed with the aim to convert wind energy at altitude in electricity on the ground in an environmental and cost effective manner.

While working at the university he assisted and advised the Nuon Solar Team, a solar racer team consisting of students, which won the biennial World Solar Challenge four consecutive times from 2001 to 2007. Ockels was also the initiator of the Superbus project. He also cofounded the sustainable engineering firm "The Green Canals" (De Groene Grachten).

In 2009, Ockels presented a talk arguing that the notion of time is human-constructed as a result of our interpretation of the effects of gravity.

== Personal life ==
Ockels was married, had two children and two grandchildren.

His sister was politician Marjet Ockels.

=== Health and death ===
In August 2005, Ockels suffered a severe heart attack, which required his hospitalization. He recovered well and was able to resume his work at the Delft University of Technology. On 29 May 2013 it was announced that Ockels had an aggressive form of kidney cancer (renal cell carcinoma) with a metastasis in his pleural cavity, and a life expectancy of one to two years. He died from complications of cancer on 18 May 2014.

== Honours ==
- Officer of the Order of Orange-Nassau (Netherlands)
- Merit Cross 1st Class (Officer's Cross) of the Order of Merit of the Federal Republic of Germany
- NASA Public Service Award
- NASA Space Flight Medal
- Generaal Snijdersfonds Gold Medal (the highest aviation award in the Netherlands)

== In popular culture ==
- On March 28, 2020, Google celebrated his 74th birthday with a Google Doodle.
- A fictional version of Ockels played by Norwegian actor Bjørn Alexander appears in the second season of the alternate history space drama show For All Mankind, in which he crashes his rover on the Moon during a solar storm and is saved by a lead character, Molly.
- Wubbo Ockels Base is among the names that get assigned to space habitats in the 2022 grand strategy 4X game Terra Invicta.
- Dutch rapper Donnie has released a song in 2015 called "Wubbo Ockels", produced by Bas Bron.
- Indiepop band John Wayne Shot Me recorded a song called "Wubbo Ockels" for their album The Purple Hearted Youth Club.
- Dutch cowpunk band Freaking Farmer Boys wrote a tribute to Wubbo Ockels: Wubbo oh Wubbo. They played the song during their live concerts in 1986 and 1987, and it has survived on some of their demo tapes.
