= STS-55 =

1993 American crewed spaceflight

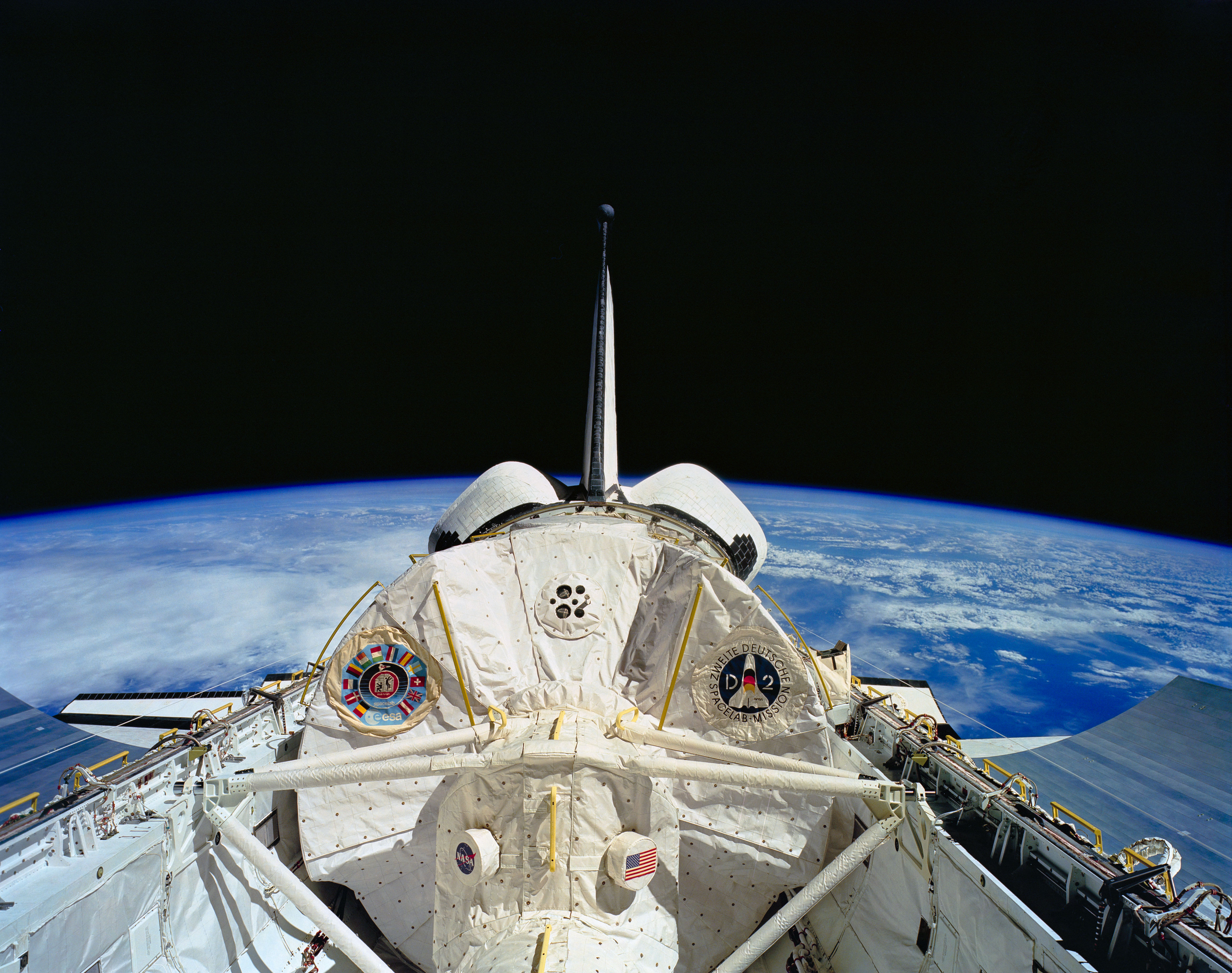
- Spacelab Module LM1 in Columbia's payload bay, serving as the Spacelab D-2 laboratory
- Names: Space Transportation System-55; Spacelab D-2
- Mission type: Microgravity research
- Operator: NASA and DLR
- COSPAR ID: 1993-027A
- SATCAT no.: 22640
- Mission duration: 9 days, 23 hours, 39 minutes, 59 seconds
- Distance travelled: 6,701,603 km (4,164,183 mi)
- Orbits completed: 160

Spacecraft properties
- Spacecraft: Space Shuttle Columbia
- Landing mass: 103,191 kg (227,497 lb)
- Payload mass: 11,539 kg (25,439 lb)

Crew
- Crew size: 7
- Members: Steven R. Nagel; Terence T. Henricks; Jerry L. Ross; Charles J. Precourt; Bernard A. Harris Jr.; Ulrich Walter; Hans Schlegel

Start of mission
- Launch date: April 26, 1993, 14:50:00 UTC (10:50 am EDT)
- Launch site: Kennedy, LC-39A
- Contractor: Rockwell International

End of mission
- Landing date: May 6, 1993, 14:29:59 UTC (7:29:59 am PDT)
- Landing site: Edwards, Runway 22

Orbital parameters
- Reference system: Geocentric orbit
- Regime: Low Earth orbit
- Perigee altitude: 304 km (189 mi)
- Apogee altitude: 312 km (194 mi)
- Inclination: 28.45°
- Period: 90.70 minutes
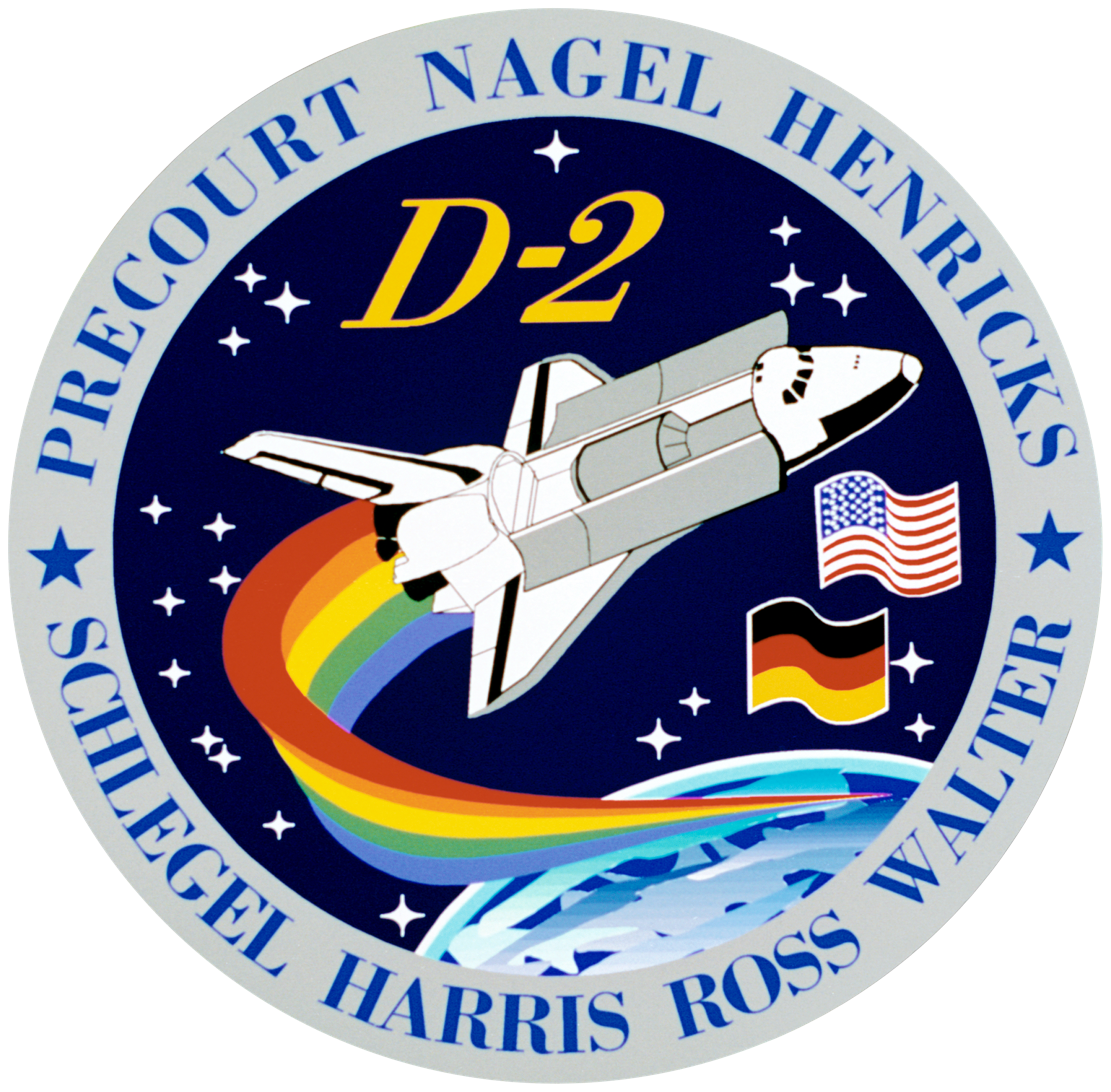
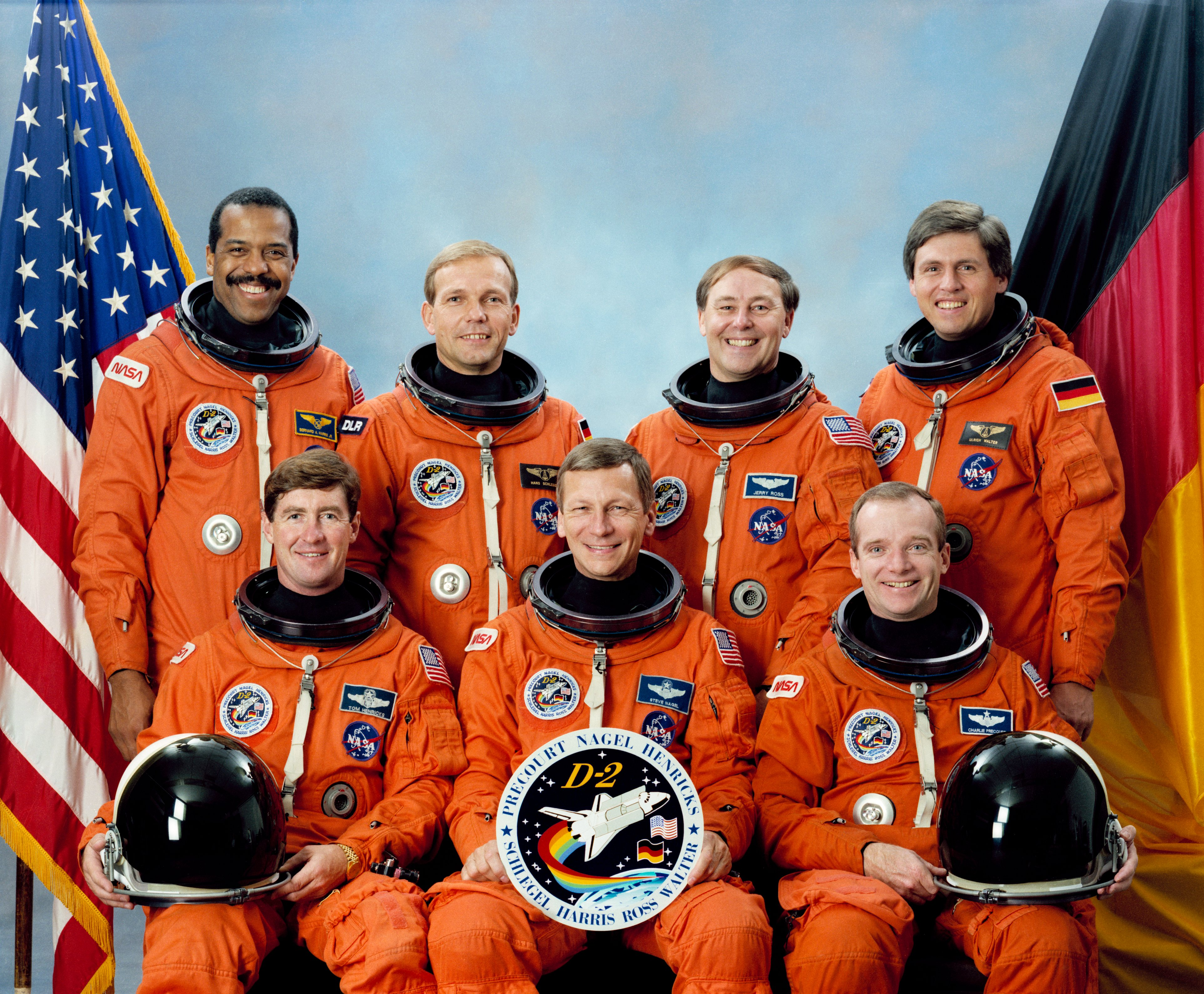
- STS-55 mission patch Standing: Harris, Schlegel, Ross, Walter; Seated: Henricks, Nagel, Precourt Space Shuttle program

STS-55, or Deutschland 2 (D-2), was the 55th overall flight of the NASA Space Shuttle and the 14th flight of Shuttle Columbia. This flight was a multinational Spacelab flight involving 88 experiments from eleven different nations. The experiments ranged from biology sciences to simple Earth observations.

== Crew ==
Position	Astronaut
Commander	(United States) Steven R. Nagel; Fourth and last spaceflight
Pilot	(United States) Terence T. Henricks; Second spaceflight
Mission Specialist 1	(United States) Jerry L. Ross; Fourth spaceflight
Mission Specialist 2 Flight Engineer	(United States) Charles J. Precourt; First spaceflight
Mission Specialist 3	(United States) Bernard A. Harris Jr. First spaceflight
Payload Specialist 1	(Germany) Ulrich Walter, DLR; Only spaceflight
Payload Specialist 2	(Germany) Hans Schlegel, DLR; First spaceflight
Member of Blue Team; Member of Red Team

Backup crew
Position	Astronaut
Payload Specialist 1	(Germany) Gerhard Thiele, DLR
Payload Specialist 2	(Germany) Renate Brümmer, DLR

=== Crew seat assignments ===
Seat	Launch	Landing	Seats 1–4 are on the flight deck. Seats 5–7 are on the mid-deck.
1	Nagel		Seats 1–4 are on the flight deck. Seats 5–7 are on the mid-deck.
2	Henricks		Seats 1–4 are on the flight deck. Seats 5–7 are on the mid-deck.
3	Ross	Harris	Seats 1–4 are on the flight deck. Seats 5–7 are on the mid-deck.
4	Precourt		Seats 1–4 are on the flight deck. Seats 5–7 are on the mid-deck.
5	Harris	Ross	Seats 1–4 are on the flight deck. Seats 5–7 are on the mid-deck.
6	Walter		Seats 1–4 are on the flight deck. Seats 5–7 are on the mid-deck.
7	Schlegel		Seats 1–4 are on the flight deck. Seats 5–7 are on the mid-deck.

== Launch ==
Columbia was initially scheduled to launch in late February 1993. However, this date slipped to early March 1993 due to concerns with the tip-seal retainers in the main engines' oxidizer turbopumps. All three turbopumps were replaced at the pad but later inspection revealed the retainers to be in good condition. Further delays were caused by the burst of a hydraulic flex hose in the aft compartment during the Flight Readiness Test (FRT). The lines were removed and inspected and three replacements were installed.

Attempt	Planned	Result	Turnaround	Reason	Decision point	Weather go (%)	Notes
1	22 Mar 1993, 9:51:00 am	Scrubbed	—	Technical	22 Mar 1993, 9:50 am (T−00:00:03)		Pad abort: oxidizer purge valve jammed on a chunk of O-ring, all 3 main engines changed.
2	24 Apr 1993, 10:52:00 am	Scrubbed	33 days 1 hour 1 minute	Technical			Possible faulty reading with one of the inertial measurement units.
3	26 Apr 1993, 10:50:00 am	Success	1 day 23 hours 58 minutes				Launched

== Mission highlights ==
Columbia carried to orbit the second reusable German Spacelab D-2 and demonstrated the shuttle's ability for international cooperation, exploration, and scientific research in space. The Spacelab module and an exterior experiment support structure contained in Columbia's payload bay comprised the Spacelab D-2 payload. The first German Spacelab flight, D-1, flew Shuttle mission STS-61-A in October 1985. The United States and Germany gained valuable experience for future space station operations.

The D-2 mission, as it was commonly called, augmented the German microgravity research program started by the D-1 mission. The German Aerospace Center (DLR) had been tasked by the German Space Agency (DARA – Deutsche Agentur für Raumfahrtangelegenheiten) to conduct the second mission. DLR, NASA, the European Space Agency (ESA), and agencies in France and Japan contributed to D-2's scientific program. Eleven nations participated in the experiments. Of the 88 experiments conducted on the D-2 mission, four were sponsored by NASA.

The crew worked in two shifts around-the-clock to complete investigations into the areas of fluid physics, materials sciences, life sciences, biological sciences, technology, Earth observations, atmospheric physics, and astronomy. Many of the experiments advanced the research of the D-1 mission by conducting similar tests, using upgraded processing hardware, or implementing methods that took full advantage of the technical advancements since 1985. The D-2 mission also contained several new experiments which were not previously flown on the D-1 mission.

The mission surpassed the 365th day in space for the Space Shuttle fleet and the 100th day of flight time in space for Columbia, the fleet's oldest Space Shuttle orbiter, on its fourteenth flight.

D-2 marked the first telerobotic capture of a free floating object by flight controllers in Germany. The crew conducted the first intravenous saline solution injection in space as part of an experiment to study the human body's response to direct fluid replacement as a countermeasure for amounts lost during space flight. They also successfully completed an in-flight maintenance procedure for collection of orbiter waste water, which allowed the mission to continue.

STS-55 crew members participated in two amateur radio experiments, SAREX II from the United States and the German SAFEX. These experiments allowed students and amateur radio operators from around the world to talk directly with the Space Shuttle in orbit and participated in a SpaceMedicine conference with the Mayo Clinic.

== See also ==
- List of human spaceflights
- List of Space Shuttle missions
- Outline of space science
- Space Shuttle
- Space Shuttle abort modes
