= Ernst Messerschmid =

German physicist and astronaut (born 1945)

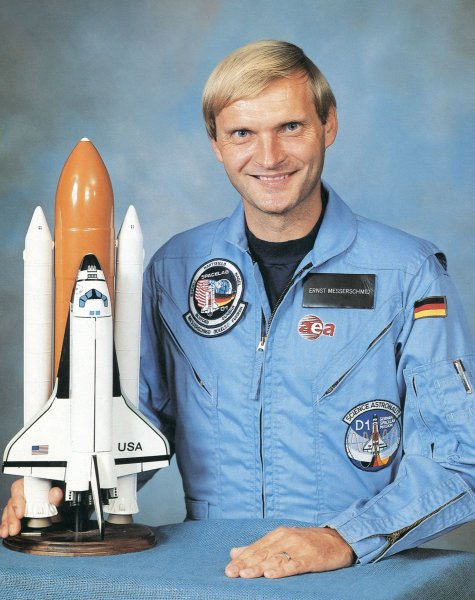
- Born: Ernst Willi Messerschmid; 21 May 1945 (age 81); Reutlingen, Allied-occupied Germany
- Occupation: Physicist
- Space career

DFVLR astronaut
- Time in space: 7d 00h 44m
- Selection: 1982 German Group
- Missions: STS-61-A
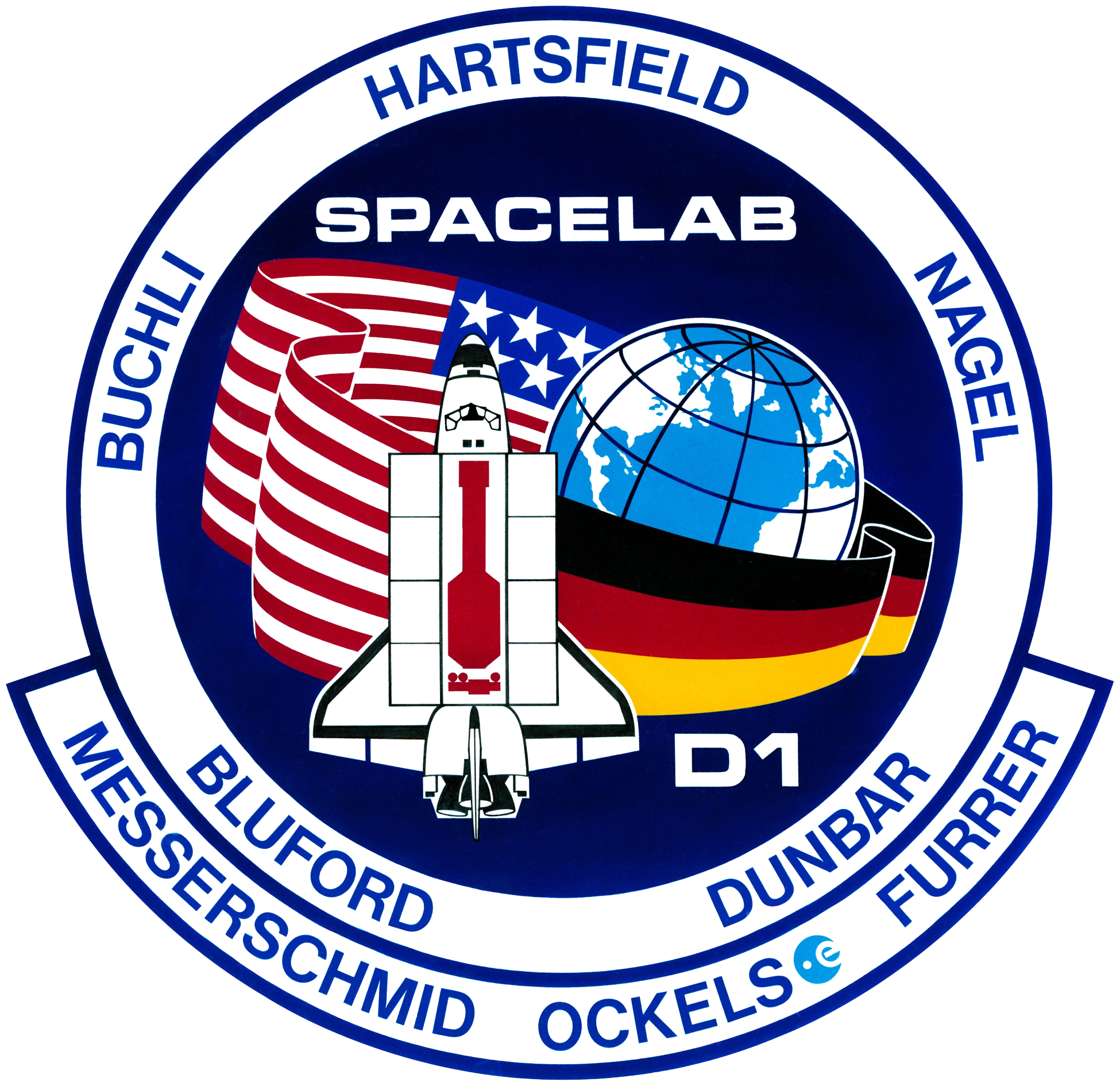
- Mission insignia

Ernst Willi Messerschmid (born 21 May 1945) is a German physicist and former astronaut.

== Biography ==
Ernst Messerschmid was born in Reutlingen, Germany, on May 21, 1945. He finished the Technisches Gymnasium in Stuttgart in 1965. After two years of military service he studied physics at the University of Tübingen and Bonn, receiving a Diplom degree in 1972 and doctorate in 1976. From 1970 to 1975 he was also a visiting scientist at the CERN in Geneva, working on proton beams in accelerators and plasmas. From 1975 to 1976 he worked at the University of Freiburg and the Brookhaven National Laboratory (New York), In 1977, he joined DESY in Hamburg to work on the beam optics of the PETRA storage ring.

From 1978 to 1982, he worked at the DFVLR (the precursor of the DLR) in the Institute of Communications Technology in Oberpfaffenhofen on space-borne communications. In 1983, he was selected as one of the astronauts for the first German Spacelab mission D-1. He flew as a payload specialist on STS-61-A in 1985, spending over 168 hours in space.

After his spaceflight he became a professor at the Institut für Raumfahrtsysteme at the University of Stuttgart. From 2000 to 2004, he was head of the European Astronaut Centre in Cologne. In January 2005, he returned to the University of Stuttgart teaching on subjects of Astronautics and Space Stations.
