= STS-61-A =

1985 American crewed spaceflight funded and directed by West Germany

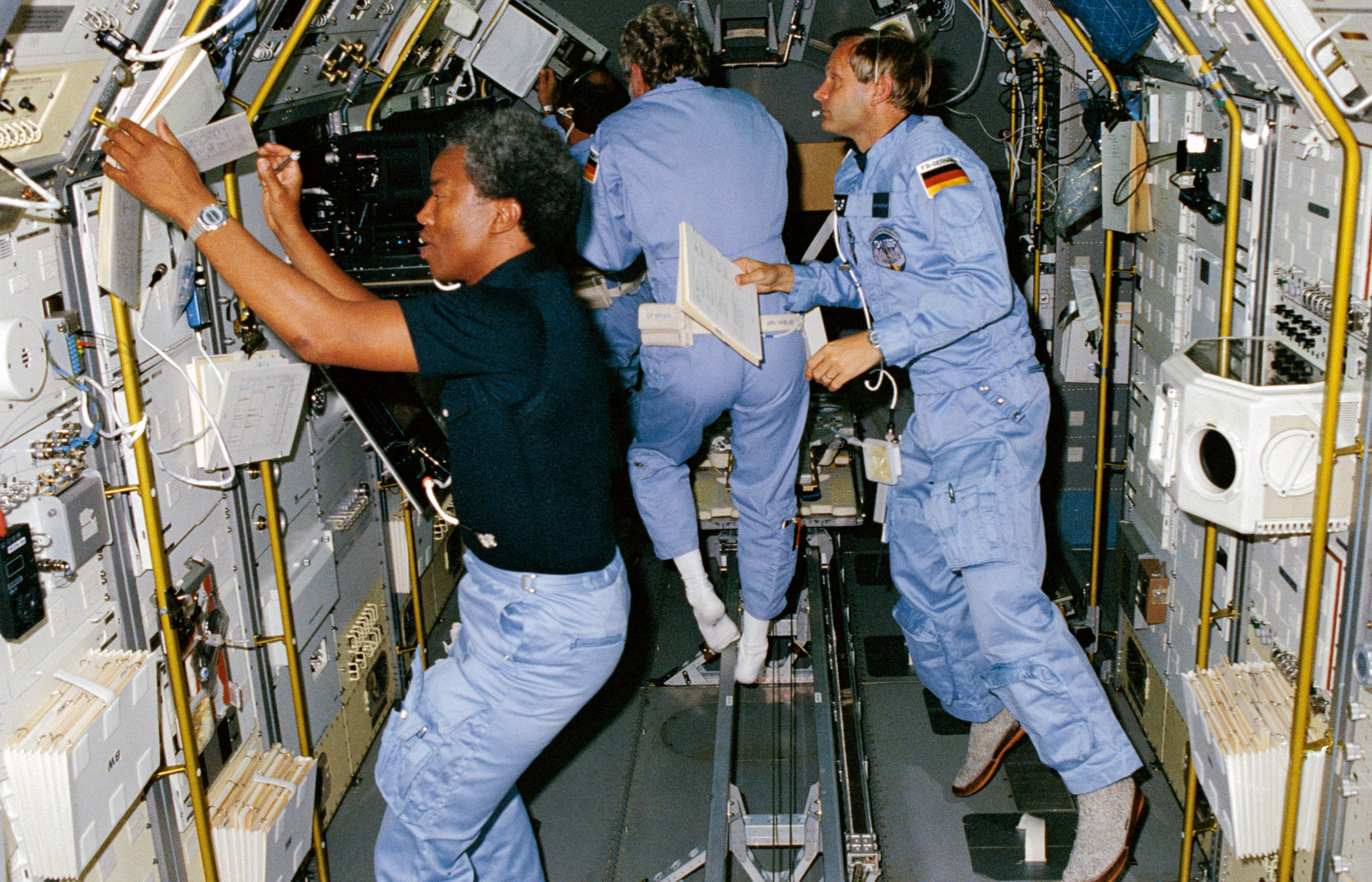
- Guion Bluford, Reinhard Furrer, and Ernst Messerschmid in Spacelab Module LM2, serving as the Spacelab D1 laboratory.
- Names: Space Transportation System-22; Spacelab D-1
- Mission type: Microgravity research
- Operator: NASA, West Germany and ESA
- COSPAR ID: 1985-104A
- SATCAT no.: 16230
- Mission duration: 7 days, 44 minutes, 51 seconds
- Distance travelled: 4,682,148 km (2,909,352 mi)
- Orbits completed: 112

Spacecraft properties
- Spacecraft: Space Shuttle Challenger
- Launch mass: 110,568 kg (243,761 lb)
- Landing mass: 97,144 kg (214,166 lb)
- Payload mass: 14,451 kg (31,859 lb)

Crew
- Crew size: 8
- Members: Henry W. Hartsfield Jr.; Steven R. Nagel; Bonnie J. Dunbar; James Buchli; Guion Bluford; Reinhard Furrer; Ernst Messerschmid; Wubbo Ockels

Start of mission
- Launch date: October 30, 1985, 17:00:00 UTC (12:00 pm EST)
- Launch site: Kennedy, LC-39A
- Contractor: Rockwell International

End of mission
- Landing date: November 6, 1985, 17:44:51 UTC (9:44:51 am PST)
- Landing site: Edwards, Runway 17

Orbital parameters
- Reference system: Geocentric orbit
- Regime: Low Earth orbit
- Perigee altitude: 319 km (198 mi)
- Apogee altitude: 331 km (206 mi)
- Inclination: 57.00°
- Period: 91.00 minutes
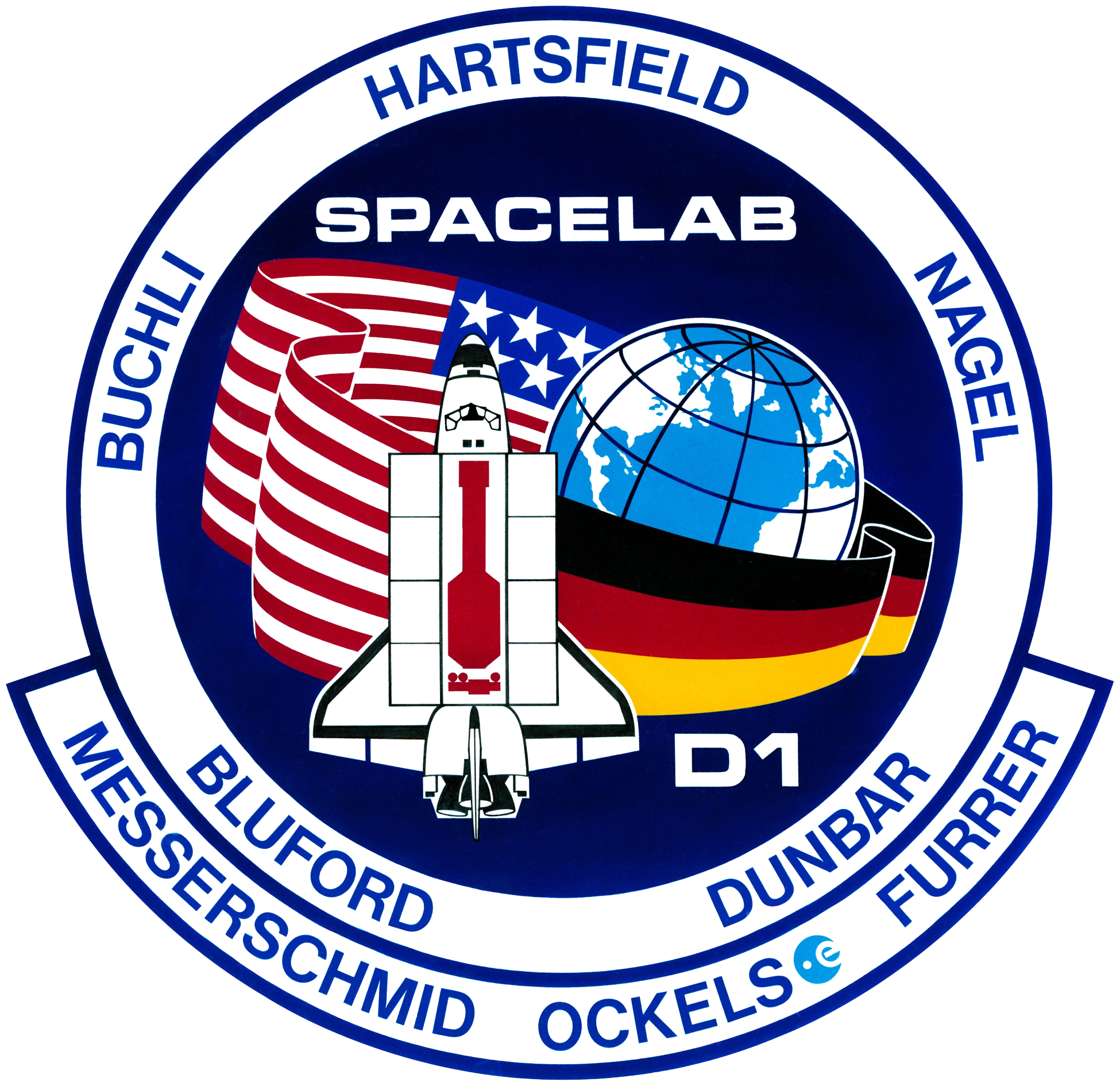
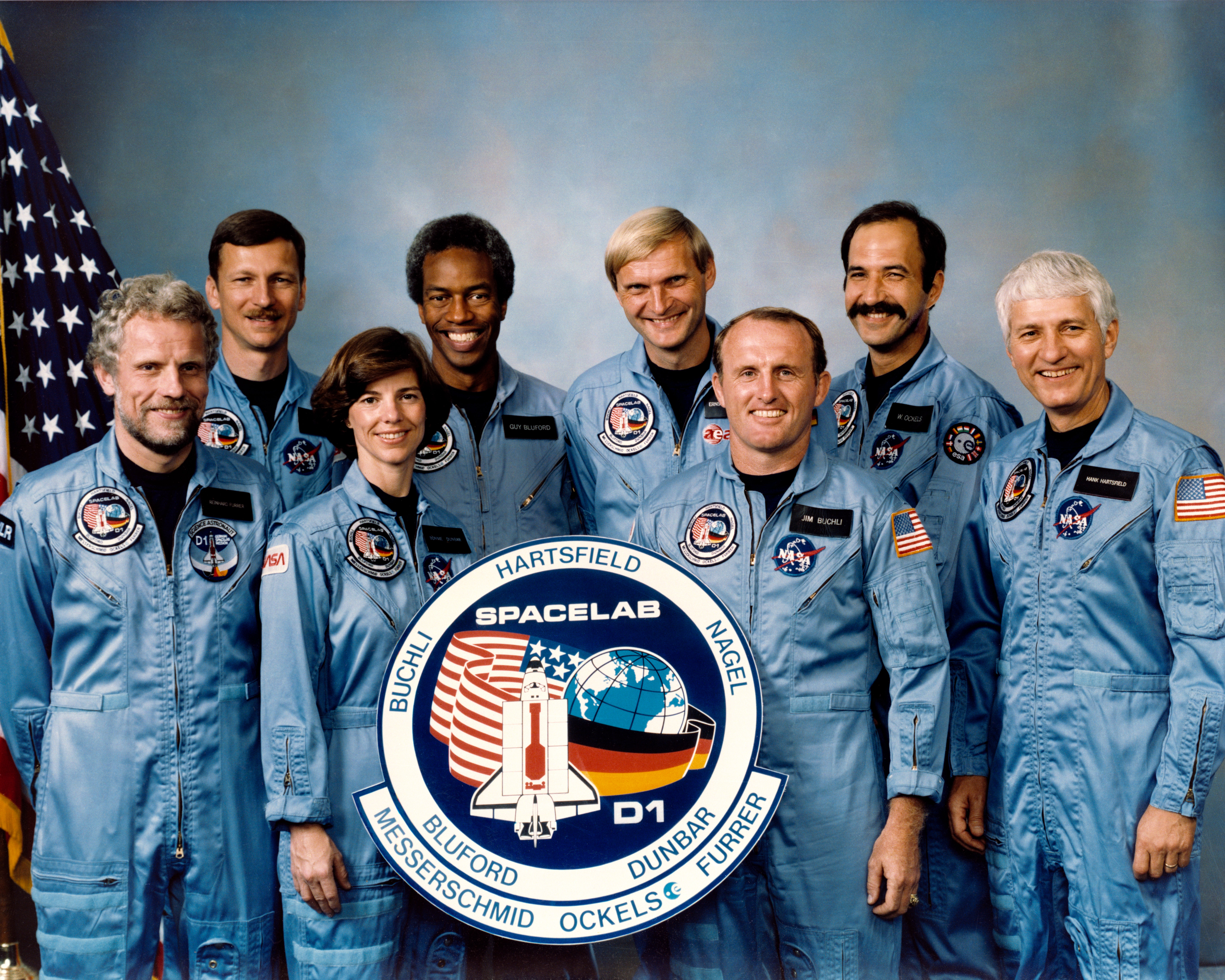
- STS-61-A mission patch Back: Nagel, Bluford, Messerschmid and Ockels; Front: Furrer, Dunbar, Buchli and Hartsfield Space Shuttle program

STS-61-A (also known as Spacelab D-1) was the 22nd mission of NASA's Space Shuttle program. It was a scientific Spacelab mission, funded and directed by West Germany – hence the non-NASA designation of D-1 (for Deutschland-1). STS-61-A was the ninth and last successful flight of Space Shuttle Challenger before the STS-51-L disaster. STS-61-A holds the current record for the largest crew—eight people—aboard any single spacecraft for the entire period from launch to landing.

The mission carried the NASA/European Space Agency (ESA) Spacelab module into orbit with 76 scientific experiments on board, and was declared a success. Payload operations were controlled from the German Space Operations Center in Oberpfaffenhofen, West Germany, instead of from the regular NASA control center. This was the first spaceflight to include multiple crewmembers from any single country other than the United States or Soviet Union. The crew also included the first Dutch citizen astronaut, payload specialist Wubbo Ockels.

== Crew ==
Position	Astronaut
Commander	(United States) Henry W. Hartsfield Jr. Third and last spaceflight
Pilot	(United States) Steven R. Nagel; Second spaceflight
Mission Specialist 1 RMS Operator	(United States) Bonnie J. Dunbar; First spaceflight
Mission Specialist 2 Flight Engineer	(United States) James Buchli; Second spaceflight
Mission Specialist 3	(United States) Guion Bluford; Second spaceflight
Payload Specialist 1	(West Germany) Reinhard Furrer, DLR; Only spaceflight
Payload Specialist 2	(West Germany) Ernst Messerschmid, DLR; Only spaceflight
Payload Specialist 3	(Netherlands) Wubbo Ockels, ESA; Only spaceflight
Member of Blue Team; Member of Red Team This was the first and only time a Space Shuttle launched with eight crew members and one of two missions (the other being STS-71), to land with eight crew members. STS-61A was also the first Space Shuttle mission in which the pilot was a veteran astronaut.

Backup crew
Position	Astronaut
Payload Specialist 3	(West Germany) Ulf Merbold, ESA

=== Crew seat assignments ===
Seat	Launch	Landing	Seats 1–4 are on the flight deck. Seats 5–8 are on the mid-deck. Seat 8 is located directly ahead of Seat 5.
1	Hartsfield		Seats 1–4 are on the flight deck. Seats 5–8 are on the mid-deck. Seat 8 is located directly ahead of Seat 5.
2	Nagel		Seats 1–4 are on the flight deck. Seats 5–8 are on the mid-deck. Seat 8 is located directly ahead of Seat 5.
3	Dunbar	Bluford	Seats 1–4 are on the flight deck. Seats 5–8 are on the mid-deck. Seat 8 is located directly ahead of Seat 5.
4	Buchli		Seats 1–4 are on the flight deck. Seats 5–8 are on the mid-deck. Seat 8 is located directly ahead of Seat 5.
5	Bluford	Dunbar	Seats 1–4 are on the flight deck. Seats 5–8 are on the mid-deck. Seat 8 is located directly ahead of Seat 5.
6	Furrer		Seats 1–4 are on the flight deck. Seats 5–8 are on the mid-deck. Seat 8 is located directly ahead of Seat 5.
7	Messerschmid		Seats 1–4 are on the flight deck. Seats 5–8 are on the mid-deck. Seat 8 is located directly ahead of Seat 5.
8	Ockels		Seats 1–4 are on the flight deck. Seats 5–8 are on the mid-deck. Seat 8 is located directly ahead of Seat 5.

== Mission summary ==
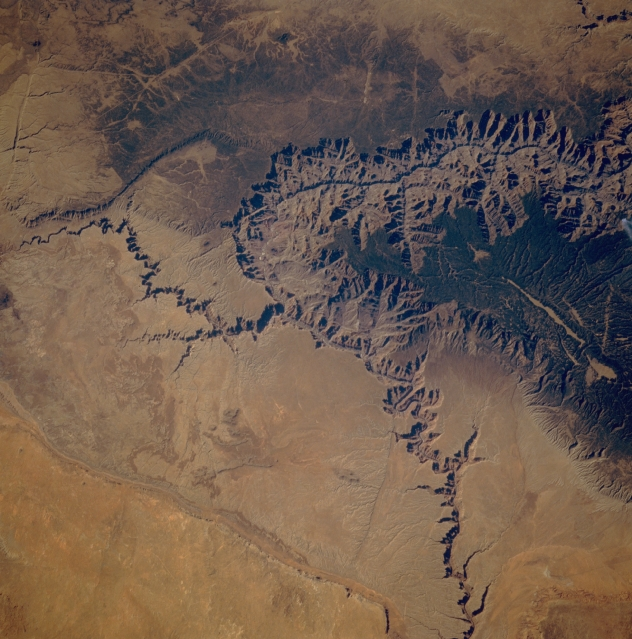
The Grand Canyon from orbit

Space Shuttle Challenger lifted off from Launch Complex 39A at Kennedy Space Center, Florida, at 12:00 p.m. EST on October 30, 1985. This was the first Space Shuttle mission largely financed and operated by another nation, West Germany. It was also the only Shuttle flight to launch with a crew of eight. The crew members included Henry W. Hartsfield Jr., commander; Steven R. Nagel, pilot; Bonnie J. Dunbar, James F. Buchli and Guion S. Bluford, mission specialists; and Ernst Messerschmid and Reinhard Furrer of West Germany, along with first Dutch astronaut Wubbo J. Ockels of the European Space Agency (ESA), all payload specialists.

The primary task of STS-61-A was to conduct a series of experiments, almost all related to functions in microgravity, in Spacelab D-1, the third flight of a Spacelab orbital laboratory module. Two other mission assignments were to deploy the Global Low Orbiting Message Relay Satellite (GLOMR) out of a Getaway Special (GAS) canister in the cargo bay, and to operate five materials processing experiments, which were mounted in the orbiter's payload bay on a separate device called the German Unique Support Structure. The experiments included investigations into fluid physics, with experiments in capillarity, Marangoni convection, diffusion phenomena, and critical points; solidification experiments; single crystal growth; composites; biological studies, including cell functions, developmental processes, and the ability of plants to perceive gravity; medical experiments, including the gravitational perceptions of humans, and their adaptation processes in space; and speed-time interaction studies of people working in space.

One equipment item of unusual interest was the Vestibular Sled, an ESA contribution consisting of a seat for a test subject that could be moved backward and forward with precisely controlled accelerations and stops, along rails fixed to the floor of the Spacelab aisle. By taking detailed measurements on a human strapped into the seat, scientists gained data on the functional organization of the human vestibular and orientation systems, and the vestibular adaptation processes under microgravity. The acceleration experiments by the sled riders were combined with thermal stimulations of the inner ear and optokinetic stimulations of the eye.

NASA operated the Space Shuttle, and was responsible for overall safety and control functions throughout the flight. West Germany was responsible for the scientific research carried out during the seven-day mission. To fulfill this function, German scientific controllers on the ground worked closely with the personnel in orbit, operating out of the German Space Operations Center at Oberpfaffenhofen, near Munich, West Germany. The orbiting crew was divided into two teams, working in shifts to ensure laboratory work was performed 24 hours a day. Communications were optimal throughout the mission and the ground and orbital crews were able to interact regularly. The overall system of one control center controlling spacecraft operations and a second controlling experiment functions worked smoothly in practice.

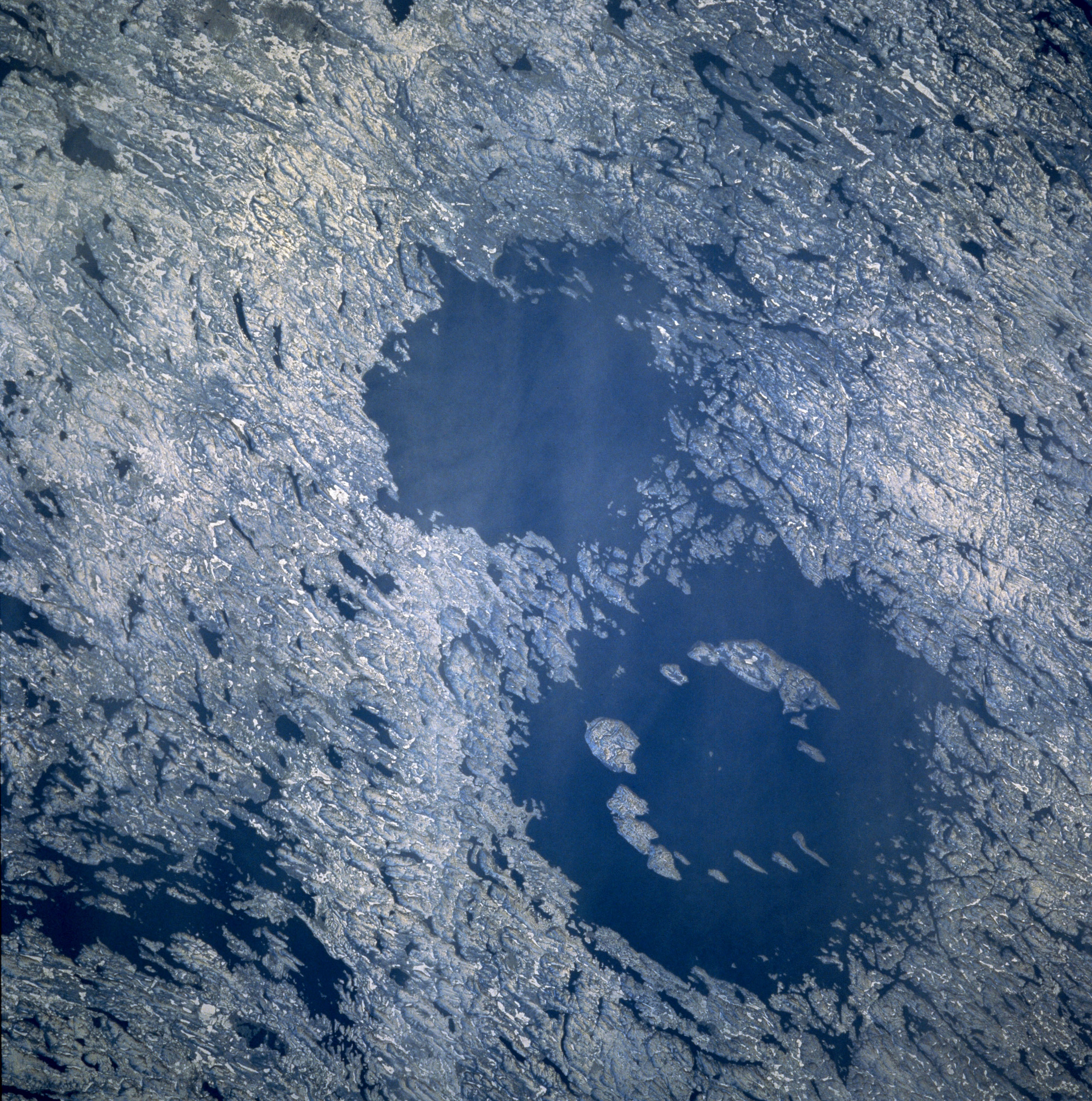
Clearwater Lakes in Quebec, Canada (meteorite impact craters) as seen during the mission.

The GLOMR satellite was successfully deployed during the mission, and the five experiments mounted on the separate structure behind the Spacelab module obtained useful data. Challenger landed, for what was to be the last time, on Runway 17 at Edwards Air Force Base on November 6, 1985. The wheels stopped rolling at 12:45 p.m. EST, after a mission duration of 7 days, 0 hour, 44 minutes, and 51 seconds.

STS-61-A marked the last successful mission of Space Shuttle Challenger, which would be destroyed with all hands on board during the launch of the STS-51-L mission on January 28, 1986.

== Records ==
STS-61-A with its crew of 8 set a record as the highest number of people in space on a single spacecraft. The first seven-person Shuttle mission had been STS-41-G in October 1984.

STS-61-A was not the first Space Shuttle flight of an ESA astronaut or a West German citizen, as Ulf Merbold, who also served as the backup on this mission, had previously flown on the STS-9 mission in 1983, but Wubbo Ockels became the first Dutch citizen in space.

Guion S. Bluford at the time was already the first African-American in space, having previously flown on STS-8. With STS-61-A he became the first African-American to fly in space twice. He would later go on to fly on STS-39 in 1991 and on STS-53 in 1992. Bluford was a member of the U.S. astronaut class of 1978.

== Mission insignia ==
The insignia was chosen by the eight members of the STS-61A/D1 Spacelab mission to represent the record-sized Space Shuttle crew. Crewmembers surnames surround the colorful patch scene depicting Challenger carrying a long science module and an international crew from Europe and the United States, and as the module is primarily part of the German contribution to the mission, the German flag and the mission suffix D-1 are prominently depicted. As to further distinguish Ockels, being the first Dutch citizen to fly into space, gets attributed an ESA logo to his name, instead of the more traditional addition of the respective non-US members being attributed with their respective nation's flags, as the patch already was that elaborately showing such.

== See also ==
- List of human spaceflights
- List of Space Shuttle missions
- Space exploration
- Space Shuttle Challenger disaster
- Space Shuttle program
- Spacelab
- List of Space Shuttle crews
