= Bonnie J. Dunbar =

American astronaut (born 1949)

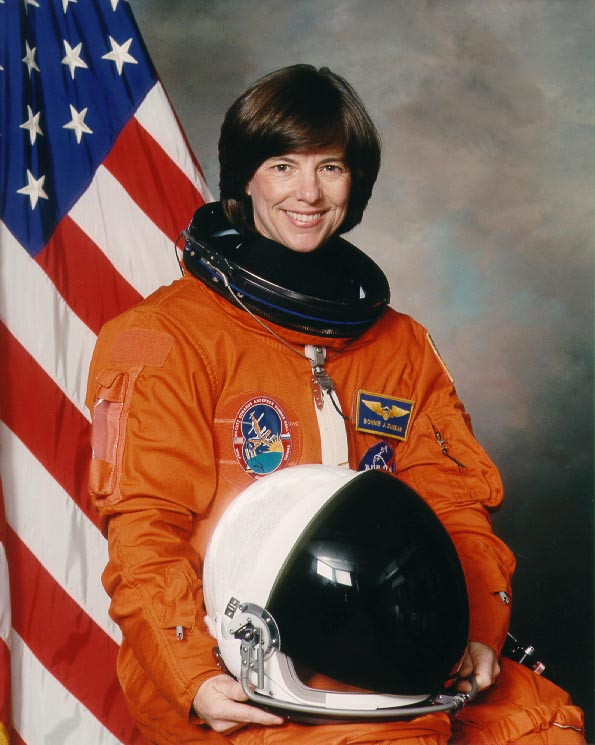
- Dunbar in 1997
- Born: Bonnie Jeanne Dunbar; March 3, 1949 (age 77); Sunnyside, Washington, U.S.
- Education: University of Washington (BS, MS); University of Houston (PhD)
- Spouse: Ronald M. Sega (m. 1988, divorced)
- Space career

NASA astronaut
- Time in space: 50d 8h 24m
- Selection: NASA Group 9 (1980)
- Missions: STS-61-A; STS-32; STS-50; STS-71; STS-89
- Mission insignia
- Scientific career
- Fields: Aerospace engineering
- Workplaces: Boeing; Rockwell International; NASA; Museum of Flight; University of Houston; Texas A&M University
- Thesis: Effects of Antiorthostatic Kinesia on Sprague Dawley Rat Femur Fracture Toughness and Concomitant Alterations in Metabolic Activity ProQuest 303164294 (1983)

Bonnie Jeanne Dunbar (born March 3, 1949) is an American engineer and retired NASA astronaut. She flew on five Space Shuttle missions between 1985 and 1998, including two dockings with the Mir space station.

A graduate of the University of Washington, where she earned a Master of Science degree in ceramics engineering, Dunbar became a senior research engineer in Rockwell International's Space Division, where she designed the equipment and manufacturing processes used to fabricate the ceramic tiles for the Space Shuttle thermal protection system. In 1978, she joined NASA as a flight controller / payload officer, and was a guidance and navigation controller for Skylab during its de-orbiting and re-entry in July 1979. She was selected as one of the nineteen astronaut candidates in NASA Astronaut Group 9 in 1980. She flew in space five times, on the STS-61-A, STS-32, STS-50, STS-71 and STS-89, and trained in Russia as a cosmonaut.

Dunbar left NASA to become the president and chief executive officer of the Museum of Flight in Seattle, where she was involved in science, technology, engineering, and mathematics (STEM) education for high school students. From 2013 to 2015, she led the University of Houston's STEM Center and was a faculty member in the Cullen College of Engineering. She became the John and Bea Slattery professor of aerospace engineering at Texas A&M University in 2016, and was the Director of the Institute for Engineering Education and Innovation (IEEI) there from 2016 to 2020.

== Early life and education ==
Bonnie Jeanne Dunbar was born in Sunnyside, Washington, on March 3, 1949, the oldest of four children of Robert and Ethel Dunbar. She has two younger brothers and a sister. Her father was a United States Marine Corps veteran who returned from World War II and purchased 40 acres (16 ha) of land in Outlook, Washington, through a lottery for veterans in 1948. She grew up on the farm, could drive a tractor when she was about nine years old, and she helped her father repair tractors. The Future Farmers of America did not accept girls so when she was nine her father started a 4-H club so she could show cattle, which she did until she was eighteen, although she was the only girl. In October 1957, Dunbar and her parents gazed at the night sky, looking for Sputnik, the first artificial satellite. She became fascinated with space, reading science fiction novels by H. G. Wells and Jules Verne, and following the real-life exploits of the Mercury Seven. In 1962, the family went to the Seattle World's Fair, which showcased an imaginary ride into space, a science pavilion and the Space Needle.

Dunbar attended Outlook Elementary, a small rural school that went to the eighth grade. When she told the principal that she had an ambition to one day build spacecraft, he recommended that she learn algebra. She attended Sunnyside High School, where she took physics and chemistry and math algebra, trigonometry, analysis and precalculus classes. She was a member of the math club, debate club, speech club, and Latin club. She played sports and was a cheerleader for three years. Her high school career guidance counselor advised her that since she grew up on a farm, she should marry a farmer and have children. Dunbar ignored her and turned to her physics teacher for career advice instead. She scored high marks in spatial ability and English on her SATs. Boys with similar scores in spatial ability were steered towards science and engineering, but these were not considered options for girls.

After Dunbar graduated from high school in 1967, she wanted to attend California Institute of Technology or the Massachusetts Institute of Technology, because that was where many astronauts had gone, but the former did not yet accept women as students, and the latter was unaffordable. She was accepted by the University of Washington, which also offered her financial assistance under the National Defense Student Loan program. She became the first member of her family to attend college. Neither Dunbar nor her parents were aware that she had to select a college within the university and could not take classes on anything that interested her. She was interested in the Romantic poets like Lord Byron, Percy Shelley and John Keats, but she still wanted to build spacecraft, so her physics teacher advised her to study engineering.

As a student at the University of Washington, Dunbar took heavy course loads, but also served on the Engineering Student Council and played on its baseball team. As a freshman, she aspired to join the university's Air Force Reserve Officer Training Corps (AFROTC) unit, but it did not accept women then. Instead, she became a volunteer for Angel Flight, a coeducational military support-oriented organization. She worked as a waitress at the Greek Pastry Shop on The Ave and in movie theaters in the University District. She joined the Kappa Delta sorority's Sigma Iota chapter as a sophomore. James I. Mueller, the dean of the ceramics engineering department, heard that she was interested in space, and he had a grant from NASA to develop the ceramic tiles used by the Space Shuttle thermal protection system. He persuaded her to change her major from aeronautical engineering to ceramic engineering, and during the summer break she became part of his team conducting X-ray diffraction studies of some of the different forms of silica fibers that were being considered for use in the tiles. She graduated with her Bachelor of Science degree in ceramic engineering. in 1971. She did some graduate work at the University of Illinois.

Engineering jobs were hard to find in 1971, so Dunbar accepted a position as an office manager at a Seattle linen-supply company. Two months later, she secured a position in the computer services division at Boeing through her experience in writing programs in Fortran IV. Boeing trained her in COBOL, and she went to work at the Boeing Renton Factory. After a year and a half, she got a call from Mueller, who informed her that he had secured a grant from NASA, and asked if she would be interested in graduate school. The grant was for investigating the use of beta-alumina solid electrolyte in batteries, and Dunbar researched the kinetics of ionic diffusion in sodium beta-alumina, with Suren Sarian as her advisor. She received her Master of Science degree in ceramics engineering from the University of Washington in 1975.

In 1975, Dunbar was invited to participate in research at the Atomic Energy Research Establishment in Oxfordshire, as a visiting scientist. She researched the wetting behavior of liquids on solid substrates. Before she left for England, she had already accepted a position in Downey, California, as a senior research engineer with Rockwell International's Space Division starting in October 1976. Her responsibilities involved developing the equipment and processes required to fabricate the Space Shuttle thermal protection system tiles that she had worked on as an undergraduate. She served as a Rockwell's representative on Kraft Ehricke's evaluation committee on prospective space industrialization concepts, and she was Rockwell's Engineer of the Year in 1978 for her work on the thermal protection system.

== NASA career ==
=== Flight controller / payload officer ===
NASA issued a call for applications for pilot and mission specialist candidates on July 8, 1976. For the first time, women were encouraged to apply. Dunbar was one of 8,079 applicants. She was selected as one of 200 finalists, and was asked to report to the Johnson Space Center (JSC) in Houston, Texas, for a week of interviews and evaluations, commencing on October 17, 1977. She was not selected; instead of a call from George Abbey, the Director of Flight Operations, she received one from Carolyn Huntoon. However, Abbey offered her another job at JSC. Joe Cuzzupoli, the vice president at Rockwell, advised her to accept; her promotion prospects at Rockwell were uncertain, since she was the youngest member of her group, and if NASA did not work out she was always welcome to return to Rockwell. In July 1978, Dunbar joined NASA as a flight controller / payload officer. She was a guidance and navigation controller for Skylab and monitored its de-orbiting and re-entry in July 1979. Afterward, she returned to her payload operator role, preparing for the upcoming STS-1 Space Shuttle mission.

Dunbar noted that all the women accepted in NASA Astronaut Group 8 in 1978 had M.D. or Ph.D. degrees or had nearly completed one. She therefore embarked on earning a Ph.D. in mechanical/biomedical engineering at the University of Houston. She took classes for two years. Her research project involved testing rats with hind leg suspension as a means of simulating the effects of a microgravity environment. The rats were kept at the Life Sciences Laboratory (Building 37) at JSC. She would dissect their femurs to study the bone, and measure their strength in the Instron machines in the Structures and Mechanics Laboratory (Building 13). Her thesis on the "Effects of antiorthostatic kinesia on Sprague Dawley rat femur fracture toughness and concomitant alterations in metabolic activity" was accepted and she was awarded her doctorate in 1983.

=== Astronaut ===
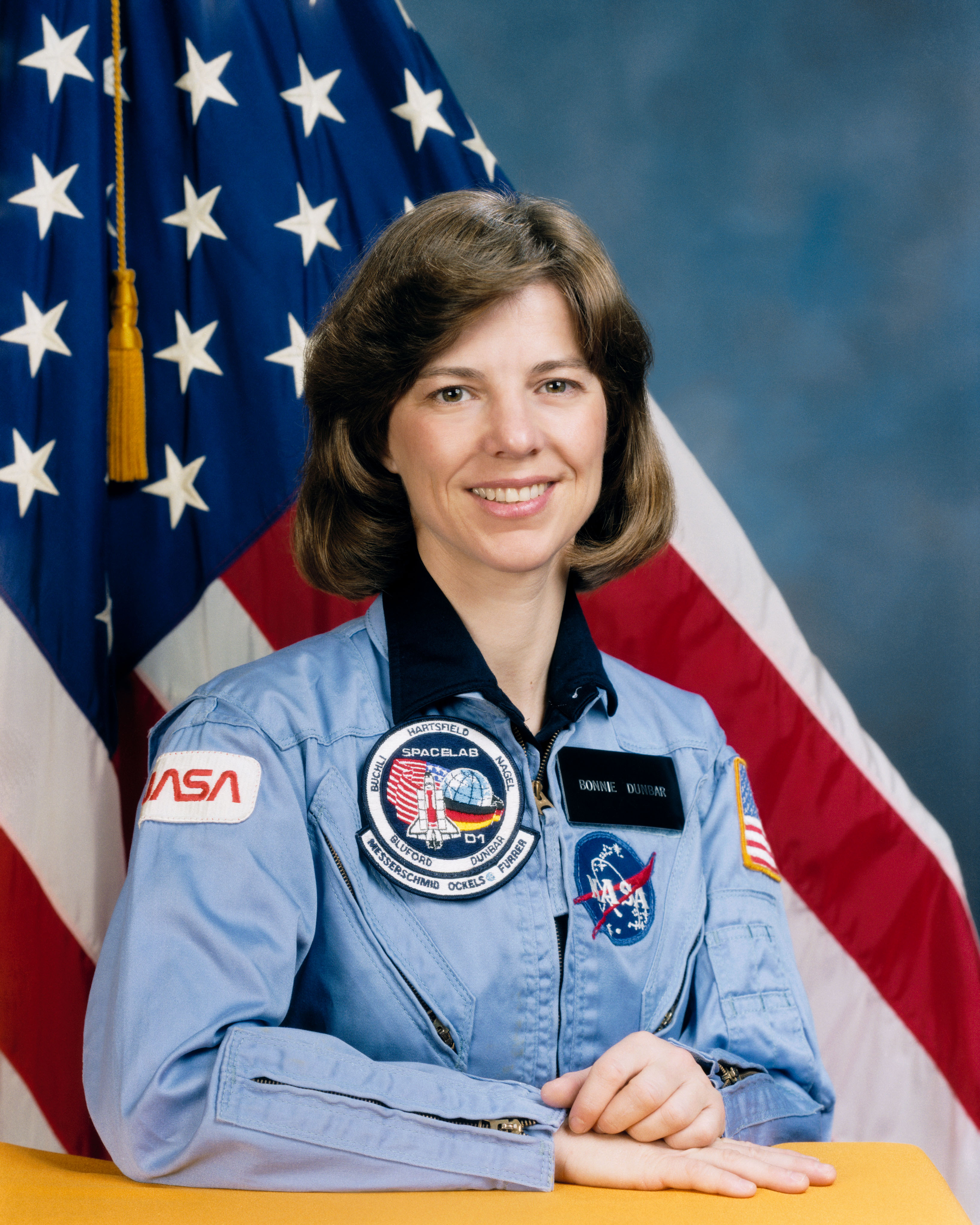
1987 portrait

On August 1, 1979, NASA announced another round of selections for astronaut candidates. There were 3,122 applicants. Once again Dunbar was a finalist, and she was asked to report for interviews and examinations on March 24, 1980. This time she got a call from Abbey asking if she would like to move her office down the hall (where the astronauts were). Her selection as one of the 19 astronaut candidates in NASA Astronaut Group 9 was announced on May 29, 1980. She was one of six civilians selected in the group, three of whom were JSC employees.

After completing a year of astronaut candidate training, Dunbar officially became a fully-fledged NASA astronaut on August 21, 1981. Her technical assignments included assisting with the testing of the Space Shuttle onboard software at the Shuttle Avionics Integration Laboratory (SAIL). She was a member of the Flight Crew Equipment Control Board, and as such was involved in the remote manipulator system (RMS) development. She later became the chief of the Mission Development Branch, and was the Astronaut Office interface for "secondary" payloads, and the lead for the Science Support Group. She was a member of the support crews for the STS-2 and STS-9 missions, and worked with Walter Cronkite on the CBS television coverage of the STS-2 mission.

==== STS-61-A ====
On February 14, 1984, NASA announced that Dunbar had been selected as a member of the crew for the upcoming Spacelab D-1 mission. The Federal Republic of Germany paid $65 million (equivalent to $194.58 million in 2025) for the mission to be dedicated to German science experiments. The other NASA mission specialist assigned to the flight, Guy Bluford, was not yet available, so the payload coordinator, William B. Lenoir sent Dunbar to Germany to coordinate the arrangements for the mission. She lived there for seven months. Although the mission was conducted in English through the German Aerospace Center (DFVLR) in Oberpfaffenhofen, Dunbar was given instruction in the German language.

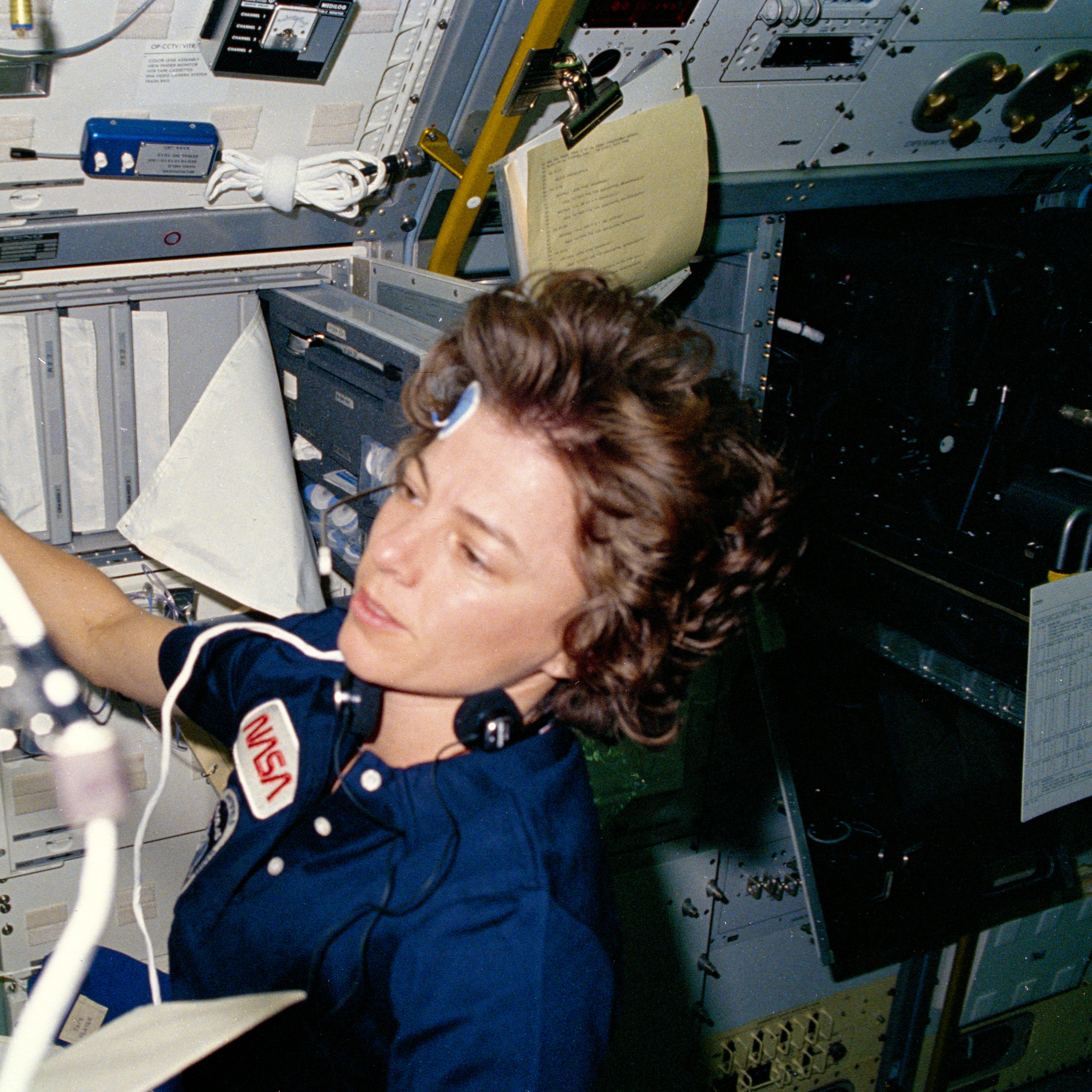
Preparing to perform bio-medical test on the STS-61-A mission

The Germans were concerned by the assignment of a woman to the mission. Some of the experiments involved drawing blood, and the possibility of female blood had not been considered, and some of the experiments like the vestibular system sled did not fit her. There were rumors that NASA had deliberately assigned her to the mission as an insult to the Germans. Dunbar reported this to George Abbey, who drafted a memo to the DFVLR stating that all equipment for the mission had to accommodate a range of sizes.

STS-61-A lifted off from the Kennedy Space Center (KSC) in the Space Shuttle Challenger on October 30, 1985. With eight crew members, this mission was the largest to fly in space, and it was the only mission that launched with eight crew members. For the first time, payload activities were controlled from outside the United States. The crew of five astronauts and three payload specialists worked in two twelve-hours shifts, red and blue; Dunbar was in charge of the blue shift and Bluford of the red shift. Some 75 scientific experiments were carried out, ranging from physiology and biology to materials science and navigation. Although she performed various experiments, Dunbar was primarily responsible for the operation of the Spacelab and its subsystems.

Challenger landed at Edwards Air Force Base in California on November 6, after 7 days, 44 minutes and 51 seconds, during which it had traveled 2.5 million miles and orbited the Earth 111 times.

=== STS-32 ===
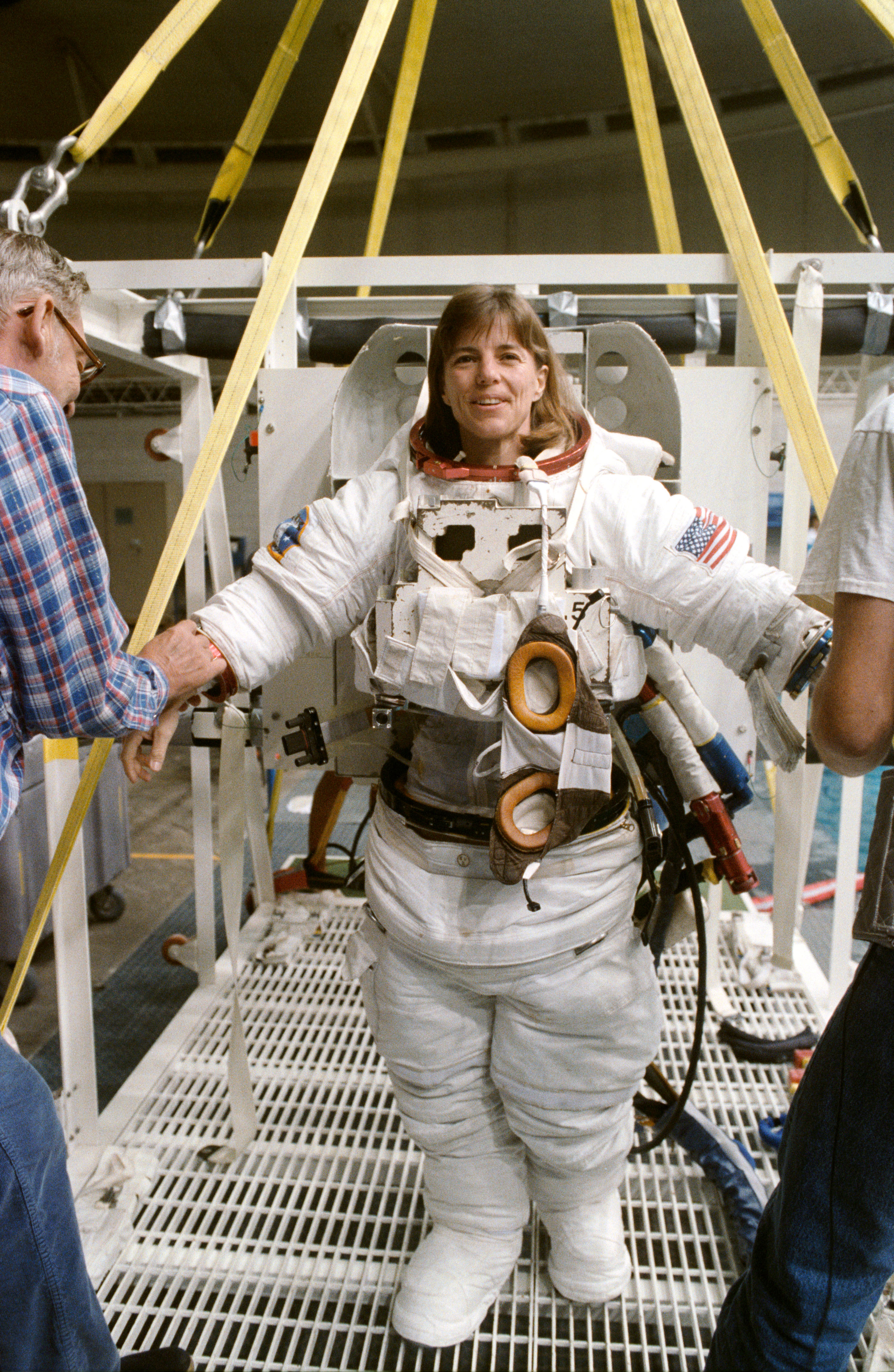
Wearing an extravehicular mobility unit (EMU) spacesuit, Dunbar prepares to don a helmet and be lowered by a hoist device for a session of underwater training in the Johnson Space Center's weightless environment training facility (WET-F).

Flight assignments were canceled in the wake of the Space Shuttle Challenger disaster in January 1986, but Dunbar became the chairman of NASA's Microgravity Materials Science Assessment Task Force, which examined proposals for materials science experiments with Spacelab and the proposed Space Station Freedom. She also became a member of the Astronaut Science Support Group, that collaborated with engineers on the design of experiments and experimental apparatus. On June 29, 1989, NASA announced Dunbar's assignment to her second space flight, the STS-32 mission, also known as Long Duration Exposure Facility (LDEF) retrieval mission.

One of the largest payloads ever deployed by the Space Shuttle, the LDEF was a 21,500-litre (4,700 imp gal; 5,700 US gal) satellite containing 57 experiments to study the effects of long-term exposure to the Low Earth Orbit space environment. It had been launched by the STS-41-C mission on April 7, 1984, and by January 1990 its orbit had decayed to about 175 nautical miles (324 km) and it was only a month or so away from re-entering the atmosphere and burning up.

The STS-32 mission lifted off from the KSC in the Space Shuttle Columbia on January 9, 1990. The crew deployed the Syncom IV-F5 satellite, and Dunbar operated the RMS to retrieve the LDEF. The crew operated a variety of experiments, but Dunbar was the principal investigator of the Microgravity Disturbance Experiment using the Fluids Experiment Apparatus. Other experiments investigated protein crystal growth, echocardiography, latitude/longitude locating, mesoscale convective system lightning and circadian rhythms. The crew themselves were test subjects for investigations of the benefits of in-flight aerobic exercise and human adaptation to extended duration missions. Activities were filmed using an IMAX camera.

Columbia landed at Edwards Air Force Base after a mission lasting 10 days, 21 hours, 1 minute and 38 seconds, during which it had traveled 4.5 million miles (7.2 million kilometres) in 173 orbits of the Earth.

=== STS-50 ===
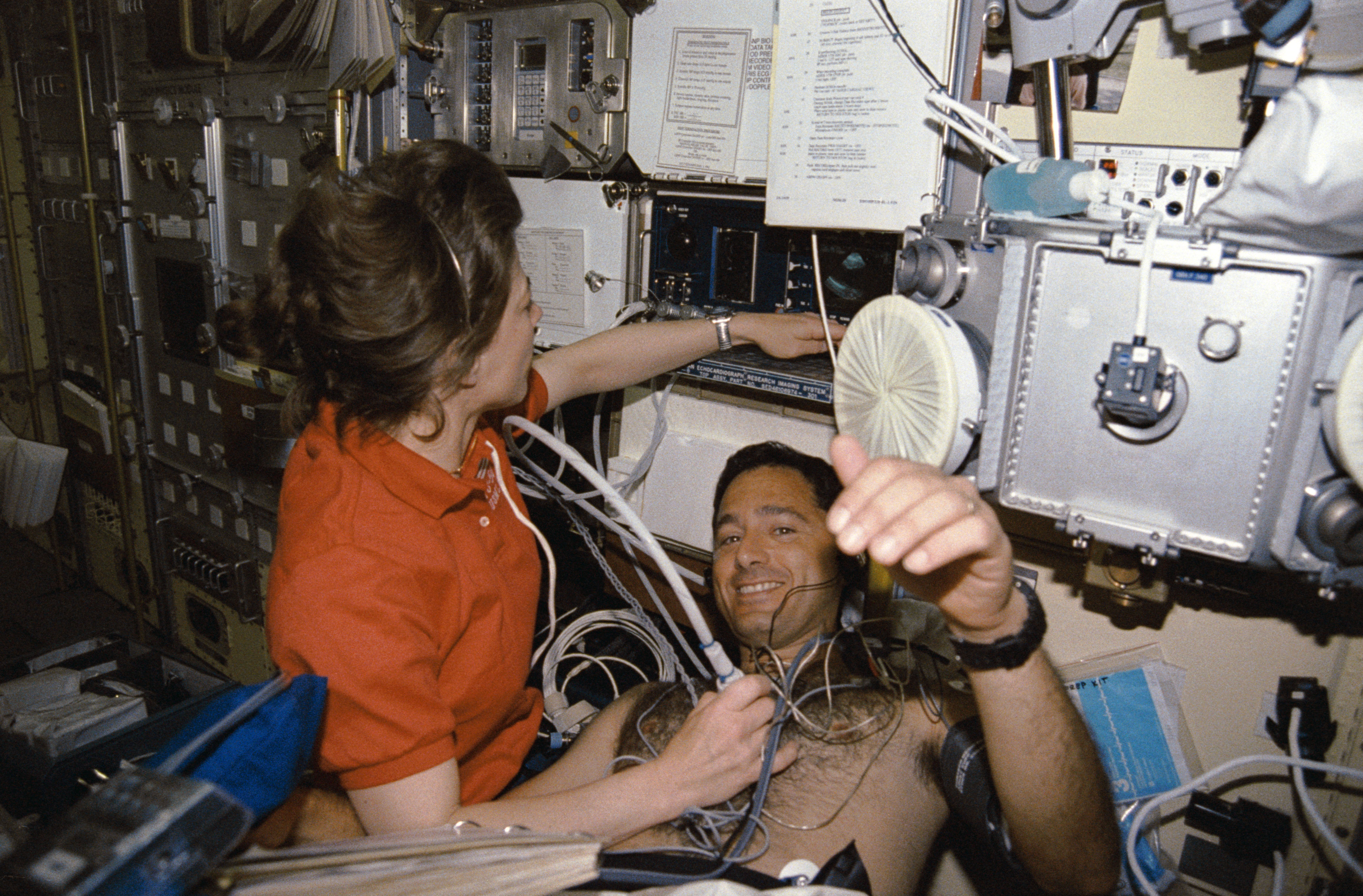
Dunbar uses a Doppler to collect medical data from payload specialist Lawrence J. DeLucas during his diagnostic "run" in the Lower Body Negative Pressure device (LBNP). The Doppler is used to pick up high-frequency sound waves from the surface of the heart, thus producing pictures on the monitor of the American Flight Echocardiograph (AFE).

Planned Spacelab missions for the early 1990s included another mission for Germany (D-2) and one for Japan (J), while NASA focused on two Spacelab life sciences (SLS) missions, SLS-1 and SLS-2. It was realized that leaving materials science to the Europeans and Japanese meant that NASA had no research facilities in development of the kind that were envisaged for the Space Station Freedom. To address this, Dunbar was appointed the head of the Microgravity Materials Research Task Group. Dunbar was designated the payload commander for STS-50, the United States Microgravity Lab-1 (USML-1) mission, which was dedicated to microgravity and materials science experiments. As payload commander, she organized the crew schedule and training activities for the mission.

The STS-50 mission lifted off from KSC in Columbia on June 25, 1992. Over thirty experiments sponsored by more than researchers were housed in the Spacelab. Over the next thirteen days, the payload crew of four performed a series of experiments related to human physiology and the growth of various crystals in microgravity. A microscope was carried on board so images could be taken of crystals as they were growing.

Columbia landed back at the KSC on July 9, after 13 days, 19 hours, 30 minutes and 4 seconds, having traveled 5.7 million miles (9.2 million kilometres) and made 221 orbits of the Earth.

=== STS-71 ===
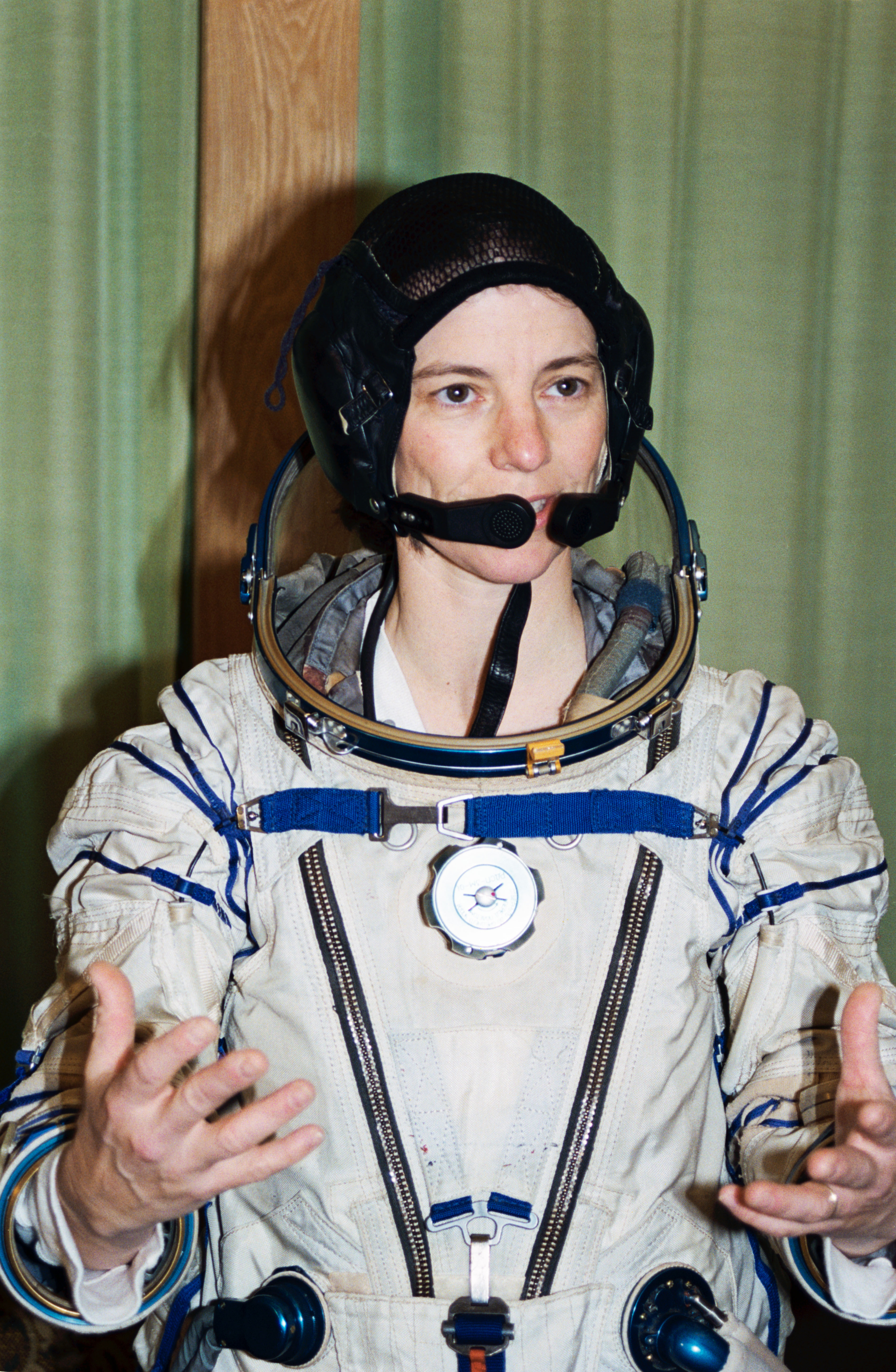
In a cosmonaut space suit in the Training Simulator Facility at the Yuri Gagarin Cosmonaut Training Center in Star City, Russia.

In 1993, Dunbar became the Deputy Associate Administrator in the Office of Life and Microgravity Sciences at NASA Headquarters in Washington, D.C. In this role she was involved in key decisions regarding the redesign of the Freedom space station, such as the decision to use air at 14.7 pounds per square inch (101 kPa), which was necessary for experiments with plants.

Dunbar returned to the Astronaut Office in Houston in December 1993. She was approached by David Leestma, a fellow member of the 1980 group of astronauts who was now the Director of Flight Crew Operations, who informed her that he needed someone to go to Russia as a backup for Norman Thagard, who had been designated to become the first US astronaut to fly in space on the Russian Mir space station. Finding a volunteer for a grueling year-long training program without any assurance of a flight at the end of it had been difficult. No American astronaut had served as a backup since the early days of the Space Shuttle program, and none had flown or even trained for a long-duration mission since Skylab, almost twenty years before.

Dunbar protested that while she had begun learning Russian, her knowledge of the language was far short of the fluency that would be required. After meetings with Carolyn Huntoon and George Abbey, who figured that since she had learned some German for the D-1 mission, she should be able to pick up Russian. Dunbar reluctantly agreed. On February 4, 1994, NASA announced that Thagard and Dunbar had been selected for the prime and backup crews for a three-month flight on Mir in 1995.

In February 1994, Dunbar traveled to Star City, Russia, where she spent thirteen months in training to be a back-up Mir crew member. She found Russian attitudes towards women disconcerting and dismissive, but made friends with Russian women who worked there as engineers and mathematicians and were eager to see her succeed. This included survival training for the contingency of a landing in the Arctic region of northern Russia, which Dunbar enjoyed, as it reminded her of home. As it happened all seven Shuttle-Mir astronauts ultimately returned to Earth on Space Shuttle missions, but an emergency evacuation in a Soyuz spacecraft was always a possibility. In March 1995, the Yuri Gagarin Cosmonaut Training Center certified her as qualified for long-duration Mir flights. To obtain this credential she took a series of final oral examinations for each system, in which members of the training department fired questions at her in Russian.

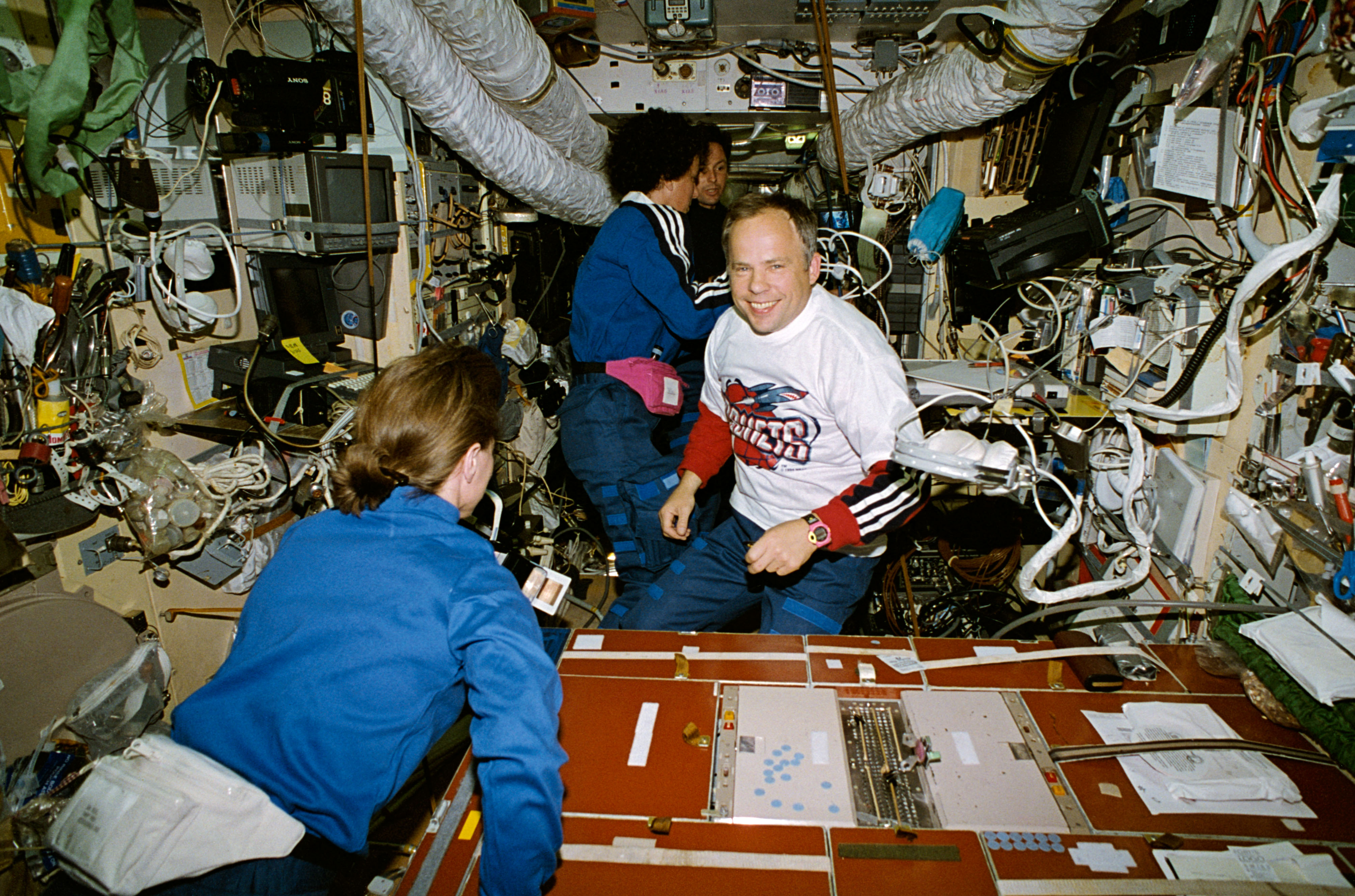
In the Mir core module

Although Dunbar did not fly a long-duration mission on Mir due to delays in negotiations, the training was not wasted, for she visited on the STS-71 mission. Dunbar was mission specialist 3 on this flight, assisting Ellen S. Baker, the payload commander. The mission lifted off from KSC in the Space Shuttle Atlantis on June 27, 1995. On this mission, the Space Shuttle mission docked with Mir for the first time, and there was an exchange of crews. A Spacelab module was also carried so the crew could perform medical evaluations of the Mir crew. These evaluations were designed to ascertain and measure the effect of prolonged weightlessness on the bones, muscles, and the cardiovascular, immune system, and cardiopulmonary systems.

The STS-71 mission lasted 9 days, 19 hours, 23 minutes and 8 seconds. Atlantis landed at KSC on July 7, having traveled 4.1 million miles (6.6 million kilometres) and orbited the Earth 153 times.

=== STS-89 ===
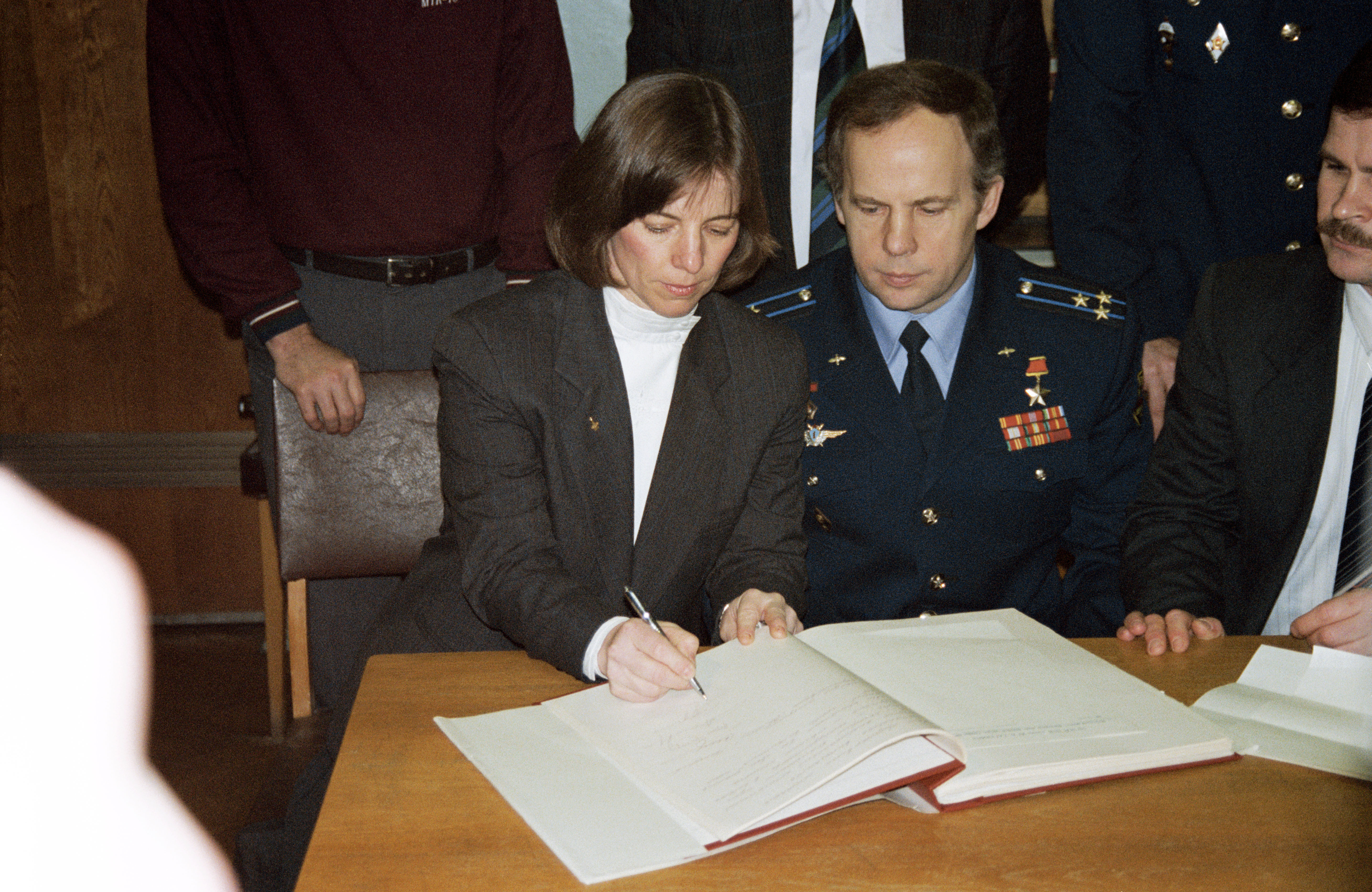
In keeping with Russian tradition, astronaut Dunbar (left), signs the diary of the late Yuri Gagarin, the first cosmonaut. Her STS-71 crew mates Anatoly Solovyev (center) and Nikolai Budarin, look on.

In January 1998, Dunbar returned to Mir on the STS-89 mission in the Space Shuttle Endeavour. Launched from KSC on January 22, 1998, this was the eighth mission in which the Space Shuttle docked with the Mir space station. The Space Shuttle crew transferred more than 9,000 pounds (4,100 kg) of scientific and logistical equipment, and supplies of food and water from the Space Shuttle Endeavour to Mir. For the fifth and final time, an astronaut, in this case Andy Thomas, was delivered to Mir and one was returned, in this case David Wolf. As the payload commander, Dunbar was responsible for the twenty-three scientific and technological experiments. Endeavour touched down at KSC after 8 days, 19 hours and 47 seconds during which Endeavour had traveled 3.6 million miles (5.8 million kilometres) in 138 orbits of the Earth.

Between October 1995 and November 1996, Dunbar worked in the Mission Operations Directorate at JSC as the assistant director for ISS readiness and Russian-American cooperation. In this role she chaired International Space Station (ISS) training readiness reviews, and facilitated Russian-American operational and training activities. Dunbar retired from NASA on September 30, 2005. On her five space flights, she had logged over 1,208 hours (more than 50 days) in space. As a private pilot, she has flown more than 200 hours in single-engine aircraft. She also logged over 700 hours flying time in NASA T-38 Talon jets as a back-seater, and 100 hours as a Cessna Citation jet co-pilot.

== Post-NASA career ==
Dunbar left NASA to become the president and chief executive officer of the Museum of Flight in Seattle. She founded the Washington Aerospace Scholars program, an online distance learning course for high school juniors run in partnership with NASA and Washington state. She expanded participation in the museum's Aviation Learning Center, Aerospace Camp Experience and Challenger Learning Center. The museum's K-12 science, technology, engineering, and mathematics (STEM) programs were expanded to reach nearly 140,000 students per year. The museum's collections and exhibition spaces were expanded and she oversaw the construction of the T. Evans Wyckoff Memorial Bridge. The museum became a Smithsonian affiliate and was re-accredited with the American Association of Museums. She handed over day-to-day management of the museum in April 2010, and officially left the museum on July 1, 2010. She attempted to acquire a Space Shuttle for the museum. In this she was unsuccessful, but the museum did manage to acquire NASA's Full-Fuselage Shuttle Trainer for its 15,500-square-foot (1,440 m^{2}) Space Gallery.

From 2013 to 2015, Dunbar led the University of Houston's STEM Center and was a faculty member in the Cullen College of Engineering. She became the John and Bea Slattery professor of aerospace engineering at Texas A&M University in 2016, and was the Director of the Institute for Engineering Education and Innovation (IEEI), a joint entity in the Texas A&M Engineering Experiment Station (TEES) and the Dwight Look College of Engineering, until 2020, when she was succeeded by Tracy Hammond.

== Personal life ==
Dunbar married Ronald M. Sega in 1988. He was a major in the United States Air Force Reserve and an associate professor of electrical engineering at the University of Colorado at Colorado Springs. Sega was selected for astronaut training with NASA Astronaut Group 13 on January 17, 1990. They later divorced.

== Organizations ==
- Board of Directors, Arnold Air Society and Angel Flight / Silver Wings
- American Association for the Advancement of Science
- American Ceramic Society (ACerS)
- American Institute of Aeronautics and Astronautics (AIAA), Fellow (2006)
- American Society of Mechanical Engineers (ASME)
- Association of Space Explorers (ASE)
- Biomedical Engineering Society (BMES)
- Experimental Aircraft Association (EAA)
- International Academy of Astronautics (IAF)
- Kappa Delta sorority
- Keramos
- Materials Research Society (MRS)
- National Academy of Engineering, Member (2002)
- National Institute of Ceramic Engineers (NICE)
- Member, National Science Foundation (NSF) Engineering Advisory Board, 1993–
- Royal Aeronautical Society, fellow (2008)
- Royal Society of Edinburgh, corresponding Fellow (2001)
- Society of Women Engineers (SWE)
- Tau Beta Pi
- Texas Academy of Medicine, Engineering, Science and Technology (2004)
- Washington State Academy of Science (2006)

== Awards and honors ==
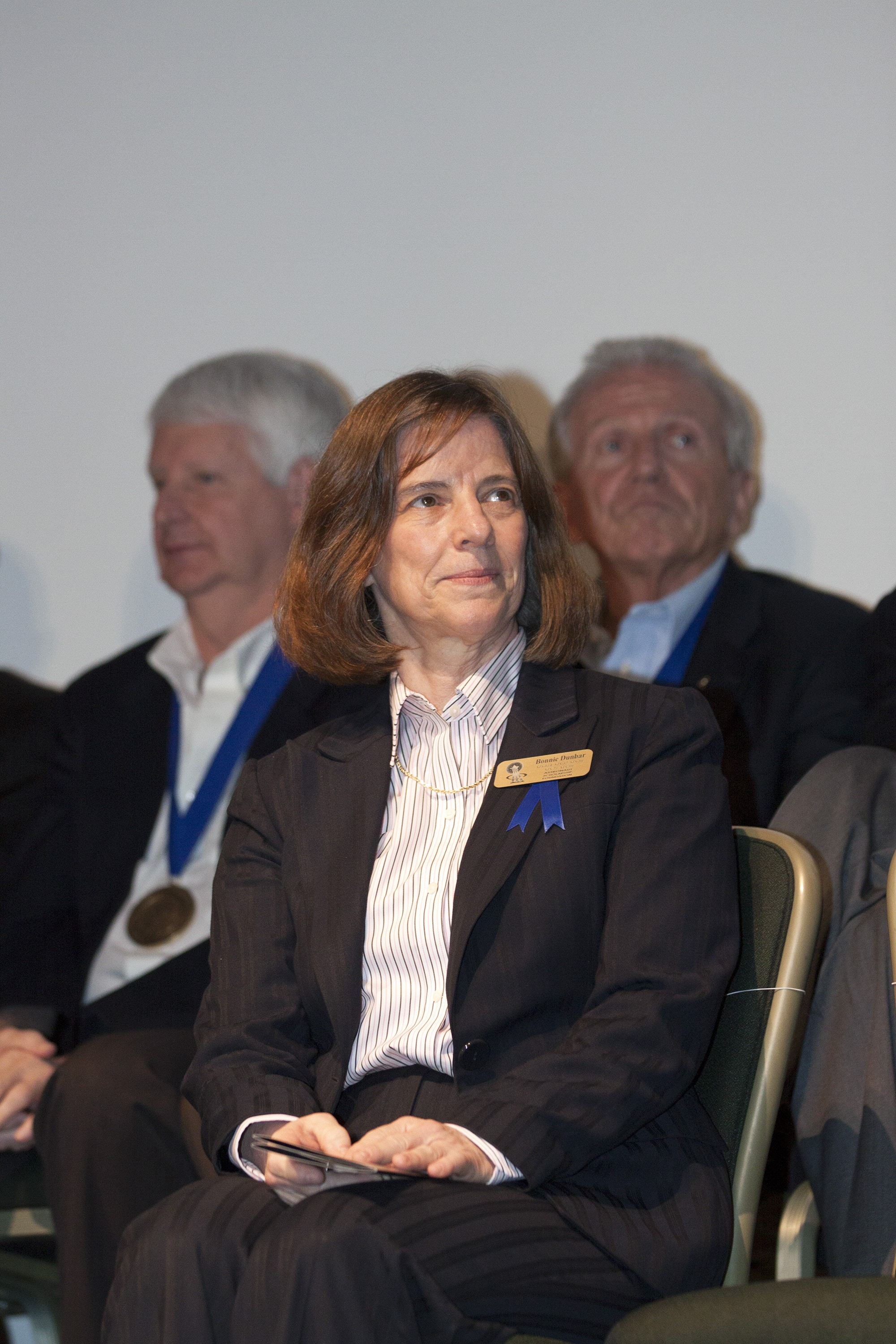
Introduced for induction into the U.S. Astronaut Hall of Fame in April 2013

- Inducted into the Texas Women's Hall of Fame (2025)
- Sigma Xi John P. McGovern Science & Society Award (2020)
- George R. Stibitz Computer and Communications Award (2018)
- Edward O. Wilson Biodiversity Technology Pioneer Award(2018)
- BioHouston Women of Science Award (2015)
- Elected to Astronaut Hall of Fame (2013)
- University of Washington College of Engineering Diamond Service Award (2012)
- American Association of Engineering Societies (AAES) Norm Augustine Award for Outstanding Achievement in Engineering Communications (2011)
- ASME Ralph Coats Roe Medal (2010)
- Elected to Living Legends of Aviation, California (2009)
- Washington State Medal of Merit (Governor's Award) (2007)
- Society of Women Engineers (SWE) National Achievement Award (2006)
- ACerS Annual Meeting in Baltimore - Orton Lecture awardee (2005)
- Arthur Friedberg Award, National Institute of Ceramic Engineers (NICE) Ceramic Engineering (2005)
- The American Ceramic Society (ACerS) James I. Mueller Award, Cocoa Beach, Florida (2000)
- Inducted into the Women in Technology International Hall of Fame (2000), one of five women in the world so honored annually
- Selected as one of the top 20 women in technology in Houston, Texas (2000)
- NASA Space Flight Medals (1985, 1990, 1992, 1995 and 1998)
- NASA Superior Accomplishment Award (1997)
- NASA Exceptional Achievement Medal (1994)
- NASA Distinguished Service Medal (1996 and 1999)
- NASA Outstanding Leadership Medal (1993)
- NASA Exceptional Service Medal (1988)
- Design News Engineering Achievement Award (1993)
- IEEE Judith A. Resnik Award (1993)
- Society of Women Engineers Resnik Challenger Medal (1993)
- Museum of Flight Pathfinder Award (1992)
- AAES National Engineering Award (1992)
- University of Houston Cullen College of Engineering Distinguished Engineering Alumna Award (1991)
- M.R.S. President's Award (1990)
- The American Ceramic Society (ACerS) Schwaltzwalder P.A.C.E. Award (1990)
- University of Washington Engineering Alumni Achievement (1989)
- The American Ceramic Society (ACerS) Life Membership (1986)
- General Jimmy Doolittle Fellow of the Aerospace Education Foundation (1986)
- Evergreen Safety Council Public Service in Space Award (1986)
- The American Ceramic Society (ACerS) Greaves-Walker Award (1985)
- Rockwell International Engineer of the Year (1978)
- Honorary Doctor of Laws from Clemson University (1990); Honorary Doctor of Science from Clarkson University (1993); Honorary of Engineering from Alfred University (1991), Michigan Technological University (1992), Heriot-Watt University (2000), University of Glasgow (2002), University of Dundee (2002), University of Strathclyde (2014) and Rowan University (2015); and an Honorary Doctor of Letters from Heritage University (2016).
