= Joseph M. Prahl =

American mechanical engineer and professor (1943–2018)

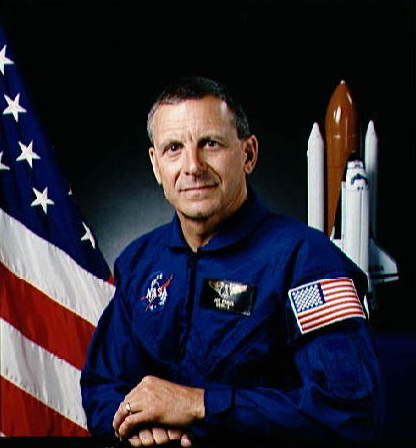
- Born: March 30, 1943; Beverly, Massachusetts
- Died: April 19, 2018 (aged 75)
- Other name: Joseph Markel Prahl
- Occupation: Professor
- Title: Professor

Academic background
- Education: Harvard, B.A. 1963; Harvard, M.S., Ph.D. 1968

Academic work
- Discipline: mechanical engineer
- Institutions: Case Western Reserve University
- Main interests: fluid dynamics, thermodynamics
- Space career

NASA Payload Specialist (backup)
- Mission: STS-50

Joseph M. Prahl (March 30, 1943 – April 19, 2018) was an American mechanical engineer and professor who trained as a backup Payload Specialist for the Space Shuttle Columbia mission STS-50 in 1992.

Born in Beverly, Massachusetts, Prahl attended Phillips Academy in Andover, Massachusetts, completed a bachelor's degree in mechanical engineering from Harvard College in Cambridge in 1963, and then an M.S. and Ph.D. in mechanical engineering from Harvard University in 1968.

He joined the faculty of Case Western Reserve University (then known as Case Institute of Technology) in 1968, becoming a full professor in 1985 and serving as department chair of mechanical and aerospace engineering from 1992 to 2007. After stepping down as department chair, in August 2007 Prahl was appointed as the faculty director for undergraduate recruiting and student life in the School of Engineering.

In 2010, Prahl was selected as a "Key Influencer" in Northeast Ohio and flew in an F/A-18 Hornet with the Blue Angels.
