= STS-50 =

1992 American crewed spaceflight

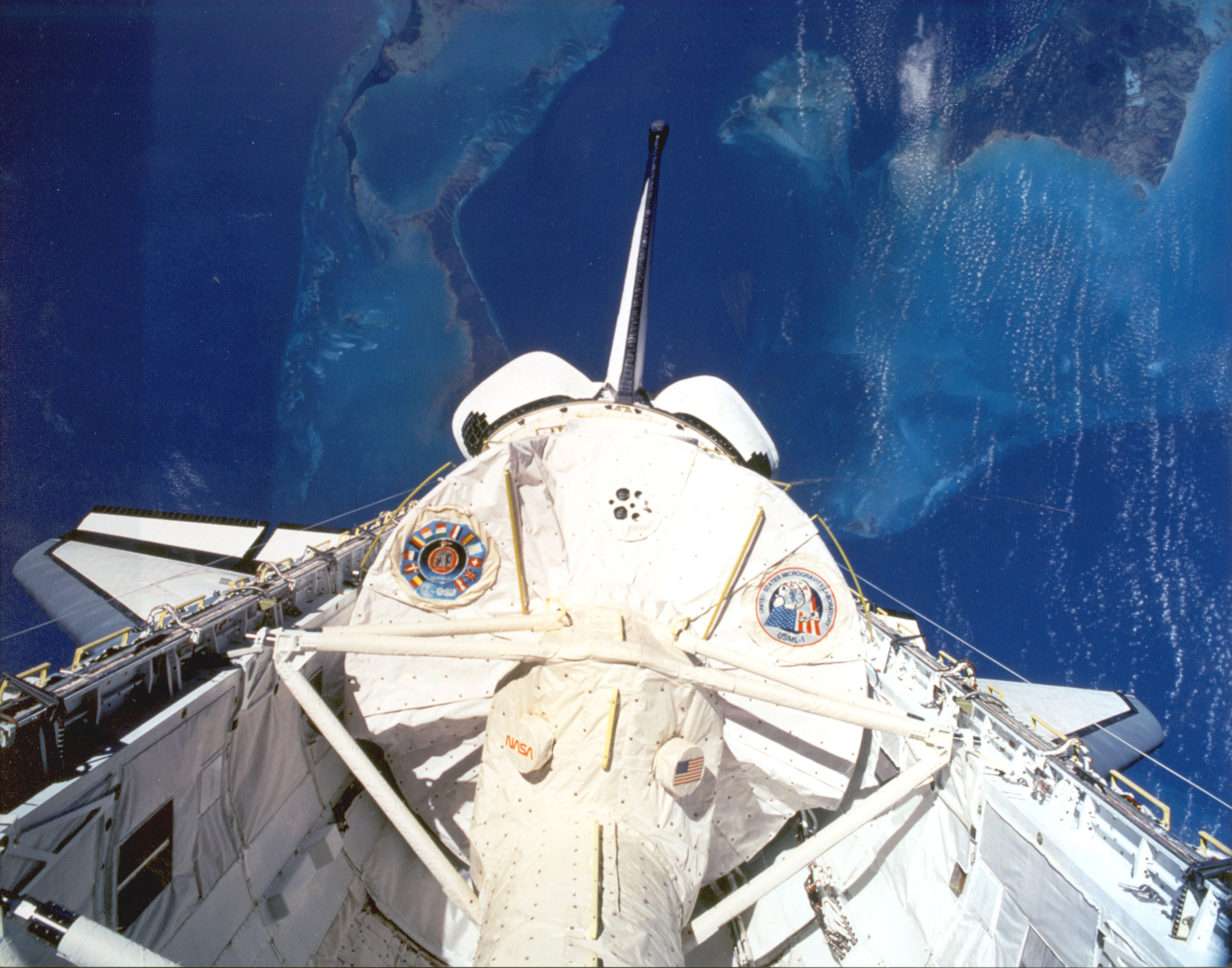
- Spacelab Module LM1 in Columbia's payload bay, serving as the United States Microgravity Laboratory.
- Names: Space Transportation System-50
- Mission type: USML-1 microgravity research
- Operator: NASA
- COSPAR ID: 1992-034A
- SATCAT no.: 22000
- Mission duration: 13 days, 19 hours, 30 minutes, 4 seconds
- Distance travelled: 9,200,000 km (5,700,000 mi)
- Orbits completed: 221

Spacecraft properties
- Spacecraft: Space Shuttle Columbia
- Launch mass: 116,693 kg (257,264 lb)
- Landing mass: 103,814 kg (228,871 lb)
- Payload mass: 12,101 kg (26,678 lb)

Crew
- Crew size: 7
- Members: Richard N. Richards; Ken Bowersox; Bonnie J. Dunbar; Ellen S. Baker; Carl J. Meade; Lawrence J. DeLucas; Eugene H. Trinh

Start of mission
- Launch date: June 25, 1992, 16:12:23 UTC (12:12:23 pm EDT)
- Launch site: Kennedy, LC-39A
- Contractor: Rockwell International

End of mission
- Landing date: July 9, 1992, 11:42:27 UTC (7:42:27 am EDT)
- Landing site: Kennedy, SLF Runway 33

Orbital parameters
- Reference system: Geocentric orbit
- Regime: Low Earth orbit
- Perigee altitude: 302 km (188 mi)
- Apogee altitude: 309 km (192 mi)
- Inclination: 28.46°
- Period: 90.60 minutes

Instruments
- Astroculture-1 (ASC); Crystal Growth Furnace (CGF); Drop Physics Module (DPM); Extended Duration Orbiter Medical Project (EDOMP); Generic Bioprocessing Apparatus (GBA); Glovebox Facility (GBX); Investigations into Polymer Membrane Processing (IPMP); Protein Crystal Growth (PCG); Shuttle Amateur Radio Experiment (SAREX-II); Space Acceleration Measurement System (SAMS); Solid Surface Combustion Experiment (SSCE); Surface Tension Driven Convection Experiments (STDCE); Ultraviolet Plume Instrument (UVPI); Zeolite Crystal Growth (ZCG)
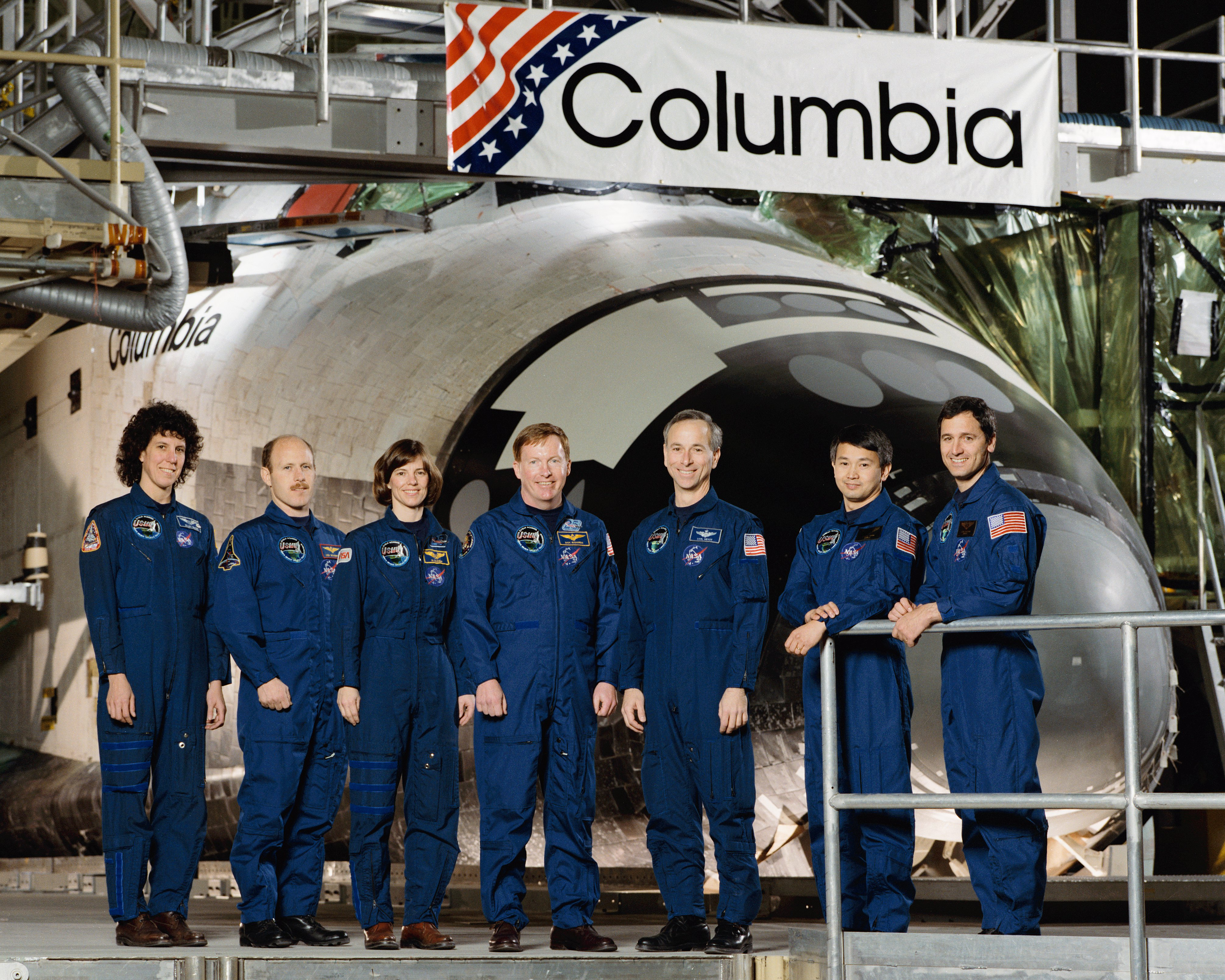
- STS-50 mission patch From left: Baker, Bowersox, Dunbar, Richards, Meade, Trinh and DeLucas Space Shuttle program

STS-50 (U.S. Microgravity Laboratory-1) was a NASA Space Shuttle mission, the 12th mission of the Columbia orbiter. Columbia landed at Kennedy Space Center for the first time ever due to bad weather at Edwards Air Force Base caused by the remnants of Hurricane Darby.

== Crew ==
Position	Astronaut
Commander	Richard N. Richards; Third spaceflight
Pilot	Ken Bowersox; First spaceflight
Mission Specialist 1 Payload Commander	Bonnie J. Dunbar; Third spaceflight
Mission Specialist 2 Flight Engineer	Ellen S. Baker; Second spaceflight
Mission Specialist 3	Carl J. Meade; Second spaceflight
Payload Specialist 1	Lawrence J. DeLucas; Only spaceflight University of Alabama at Birmingham
Payload Specialist 2	Eugene H. Trinh; Only spaceflight Jet Propulsion Laboratory
Member of Blue Team; Member of Red Team

Backup crew
Position	Astronaut
Payload Specialist 1	Joseph M. Prahl
Payload Specialist 2	Albert Sacco

The astronauts were divided into a red team and a blue team to allow around-the-clock monitoring of experiments.

=== Crew seat assignments ===
Seat	Launch	Landing	Seats 1–4 are on the flight deck. Seats 5–7 are on the mid-deck.
1	Richards		Seats 1–4 are on the flight deck. Seats 5–7 are on the mid-deck.
2	Bowersox		Seats 1–4 are on the flight deck. Seats 5–7 are on the mid-deck.
3	Dunbar	Meade	Seats 1–4 are on the flight deck. Seats 5–7 are on the mid-deck.
4	Baker		Seats 1–4 are on the flight deck. Seats 5–7 are on the mid-deck.
5	Meade	Dunbar	Seats 1–4 are on the flight deck. Seats 5–7 are on the mid-deck.
6	DeLucas		Seats 1–4 are on the flight deck. Seats 5–7 are on the mid-deck.
7	Trinh		Seats 1–4 are on the flight deck. Seats 5–7 are on the mid-deck.

== Mission highlights ==
The U.S. Microgravity Laboratory-1 was a spacelab mission that included experiments in material science, fluid physics and biotechnology. It was the first flight of a Space Shuttle with the Extended Duration Orbiter (EDO) hardware, which allowed longer flight durations.

The primary payload was the U.S. Microgravity Laboratory-1 (USML-1), which made its first flight. It featured a pressurized Spacelab module. USML-1 was the first in a planned series of flights to advance U.S. microgravity research efforts in several disciplines. Experiments conducted were: Crystal Growth Furnace (CGF); Drop Physics Module (DPM); Surface Tension Driven Convection Experiments (STDCE); Zeolite Crystal Growth (ZCG); Protein Crystal Growth (PCG); Glovebox Facility (GBX); Space Acceleration Measurement System (SAMS); Generic Bioprocessing Apparatus (GBA); Astroculture-1 (ASC); Extended Duration Orbiter Medical Project (EDOMP); Solid Surface Combustion Experiment (SSCE). Secondary experiments were: Investigations into Polymer Membrane Processing (IPMP); Shuttle Amateur Radio Experiment (SAREX-II); and Ultraviolet Plume Instrument (UVPI).

=== Major mission accomplishments ===
- Completed first dedicated United States Microgravity Laboratory-1 flight laying the groundwork for Space Station Freedom science operations.
- Completed 31 microgravity experiments in five basic areas: fluid dynamics, crystal growth, combustion science, biological science, and technology demonstration.
- Introduced several new microgravity experiment facilities for multiple users and multiple flights (including the Crystal Growth Furnace, Drop Physics Module, and the Surface Tension Driven Convection Experiment).
- Demonstrated the efficiency of interactive science operations between crewmembers and scientists on the ground for optimizing science return.
- Completed longest period of protein crystal growth in Space Shuttle program.
- Conducted iterative crystal growing experiments where chemical compositions were altered based upon microscopic observations of growth processes.
- Completed longest Space Shuttle mission (13 days 19 hours 30 minutes) at that time and the first Extended Duration Orbiter (EDO) flight of the Space Shuttle program.
- Demonstrated versatility of the new Glovebox Facility (GBX) for crewmember interaction with multiple experiments for maximum science.

The Space Shuttle Columbia rocketed into orbit for the longest Shuttle flight in history. Columbia touched down almost 14 days later, returning with data and specimens amassed from an important suite of microgravity experiments. Shuttle mission STS-50 carried the first United States Microgravity Laboratory-1 (USML-1) to space, conducting long-duration microgravity experiments. Microgravity is a gravitational acceleration that is small when compared to the gravitational attraction at Earth's surface. Through the action of free fall (e.g., Space Shuttle orbiting Earth), the local effects of gravity are greatly reduced, thus creating a microgravity environment.

During the extended mission of Columbia, scientist crew members working inside the Spacelab long module carried in the payload bay of Columbia, conducted more than 30 microgravity investigations and tests. To maximize the scientific return from the mission, experiments took place around the clock. The investigations fell under five basic areas of microgravity science research: fluid dynamics (the study of how liquids and gases respond to the application or absence of differing forces), materials science (the study of materials solidification and crystal growth), combustion science (the study of the processes and phenomena of burning), biotechnology (the study of phenomena related to products derived from living organisms), and technology demonstrations that sought to prove experimental concepts for use in future Shuttle missions and on Space Station Freedom.

Three new major experiment facilities were flown on USML-1: the Crystal Growth Furnace, Surface Tension Driven Convection Experiment apparatus, and Drop Physics Module. An additional piece of new hardware on this flight was the versatile glovebox, which permitted "hands-on" manipulation of small experiments while isolating the crew from the liquids, gases, or solids involved. Some of the USML-1 experiments are described below.

=== Spacelab experiments ===
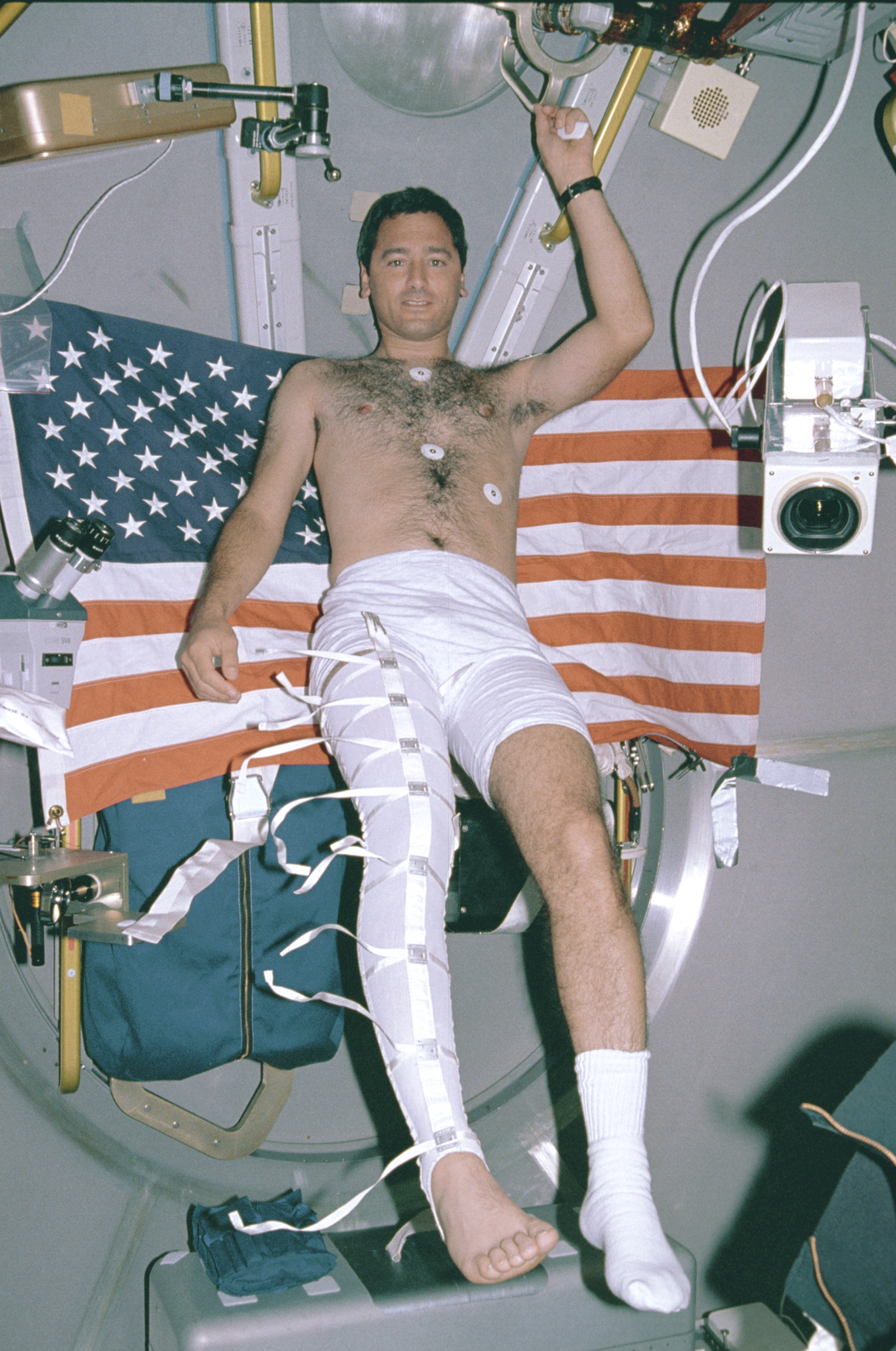
Lawrence DeLucas wearing stocking plethysmograph during mission.

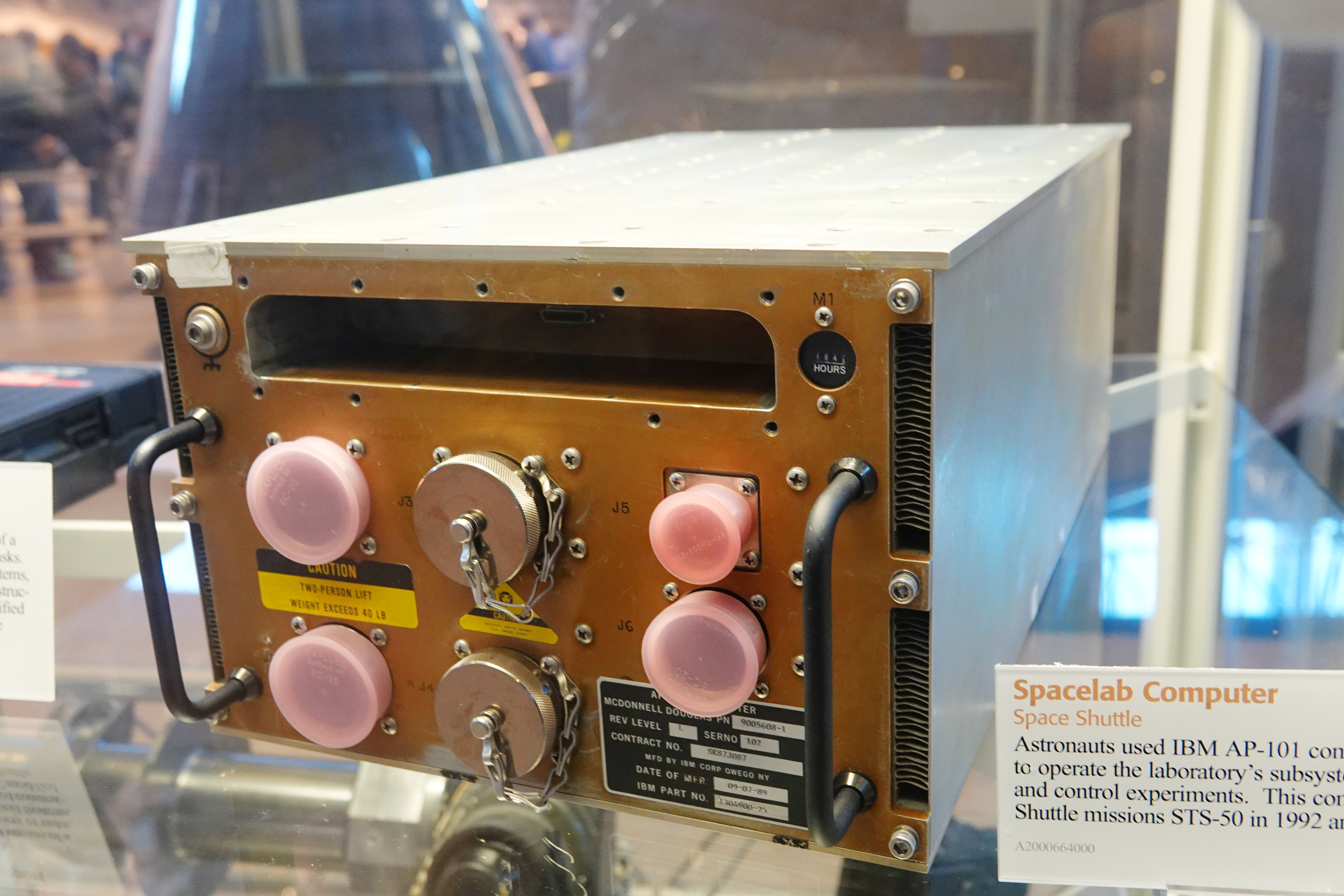
Spacelab computer

The Crystal Growth Furnace (CGF) is a reusable facility for investigating crystal growth in microgravity. It is capable of automatically processing up to six large samples at temperatures up to 1,600 °C (2,910 °F). Additional samples can be processed upon performing manual sample exchange. Two methods of crystal growth, directional solidification and vapor transport, were used on USML-1. By analyzing the composition and the atomic structure of crystals grown without the dominating influence of gravity, scientists will gain insight into correlations between fluid flows during solidification and the defects in a crystal. CGF operated for 286 hours and processed seven samples, three more than scheduled, including two gallium arsenide semiconductor crystals. Gallium arsenide crystals are used in high-speed digital integrated circuits, optoelectronic integrated circuits, and solid-state lasers. Crew members were able to exchange samples using a specially designed flexible glovebox to provide additional experiment operations.

The Surface Tension Driven Convection Experiment (STDCE) was the first space experiment to use state-of-the-art instruments to obtain quantitative data on surface tension-driven flows on the surface of liquids over a wide range of variables in a microgravity environment. Very slight surface temperature differences are sufficient to generate subtle fluid flows on the surface of liquids. Such flows, referred to as "thermocapillary", exist on fluid surfaces on Earth. However, thermocapillary flows on Earth are very difficult to study because they are often masked by much stronger buoyancy-driven flows. In microgravity, buoyancy-driven flows are greatly reduced, permitting the study of this phenomenon. STDCE provided the first observations of thermocapillary flow in a curved surface fluid and demonstrated that surface tension is a powerful driving force for fluid motion.

The Drop Physics Module (DPM) permitted the study of liquids without the interference of a container. Liquids on Earth take the shape of the container that holds them. Furthermore, the materials that make up the container may chemically contaminate the liquids under study. The DPM uses acoustical (sound) waves to position a drop in the center of a chamber. By studying drops in this manner, scientists have the opportunity to test basic fluid physics theories in the areas of nonlinear dynamics, capillary waves, and surface rheology (changes in the form and flow of matter). Crew members, through manipulation of the sound waves, were able to rotate, oscillate, merge, and even split drops. In another test, the crew members were able to create the first compound drop, a drop within a drop, to investigate a process that could eventually be employed to encapsulate living cells within a semi-permeable membrane for use in medical transplantation treatments.

The Glovebox Facility (GBX) perhaps proved to be the most versatile new space laboratory equipment introduced in the last few years. The glovebox offers crew members the opportunity to manipulate many different kinds of test activities, demonstrations and materials (even toxic, irritating, or potentially infectious ones) without making direct contact with them. The GBX has a viewport (window) into a clean workspace, built-in gloves for the manipulation of samples and equipment, a negative air pressure system, a filter system, and an entry door for passing materials and experiments into and out of the work area. The primary use of the glovebox was to selectively mix protein crystals and monitor their growth. The Glovebox allowed crew members to periodically change compositions to optimize the growth, a first for space. Other tests conducted inside the glovebox included studies on candle flames, fiber pulling, particle dispersion, surface convection in liquids, and liquid/container interfaces. Sixteen tests and demonstrations in all were conducted inside the glovebox. The glovebox also provided crew members the opportunity to perform backup operations on the Generic Bioprocessing Apparatus, which were not planned.

Another of the Spacelab experiments was the Generic Bioprocessing Apparatus (GBA), a device for processing biological materials. The GBA processed 132 individual experiments with volumes of several milliliters. The apparatus studied living cells, microorganisms used in ecological waste treatment, and the development of brine shrimp and wasp eggs, and other biomedical test models which are used in cancer research. One sample studied, Liposomes, consist of spherical structures that could be used to encapsulate pharmaceuticals. If this biological product can be formed properly, it could be used to deliver a drug to a specific tissue in the body, such as a tumor.

The Space Acceleration Measurement System (SAMS) instrument measured the low-level acceleration (aka microgravity) conditions experienced by the microgravity experiments during the mission. These data are invaluable for the scientists to ascertain whether effects seen in their experimental data are due to external disturbances or not. The SAMS instruments flew on more than twenty Shuttle missions, 3.5 years on Mir, and a new version is presently (2006) on the International Space Station.

=== Mid-deck microgravity experiments ===
While most STS-50 experiments were conducted in the U.S. Microgravity Laboratory-1 (USML-1), others were operating in Columbia's mid-deck. Included in the mid-deck experiments were studies of Protein Crystal Growth, Astroculture, and Zeolite Crystal Growth.

The Protein Crystal Growth experiment made its fourteenth shuttle flight, but USML-1 represented the first time crew members were able to optimize growth conditions using the glovebox. About 300 samples were seeded from 34 protein types including HIV Reverse Transcriptase Complex (an enzyme that is a chemical key to the replication of AIDS) and Factor D (an important enzyme in human immune systems). About 40% of the proteins flown will be used for X-ray diffraction studies. The increased size and yield can be attributed to the extended crystal growth time provided by this mission. Scientists on the ground will use X-ray crystallography to study each protein's three-dimensional structure which, when determined, may aid in controlling each protein's activity through rational drug design.

The Astroculture experiment evaluated a water delivery system to be used for supporting the growth of plants in microgravity. Plant growth in space is looked at as a possible method of providing food, oxygen, purified water, and carbon dioxide removal for long-term human habitation in space. Since fluids behave differently in microgravity than they do on Earth, plant watering systems used on Earth do not adapt well to microgravity use.

The Zeolite Crystal Growth experiment processed 38 separate samples which were mixed in the glovebox. Zeolite crystals are used to purify biological fluids, as additives in laundry detergents, and in waste clean-up applications.

=== Extended duration orbiter (EDO) ===
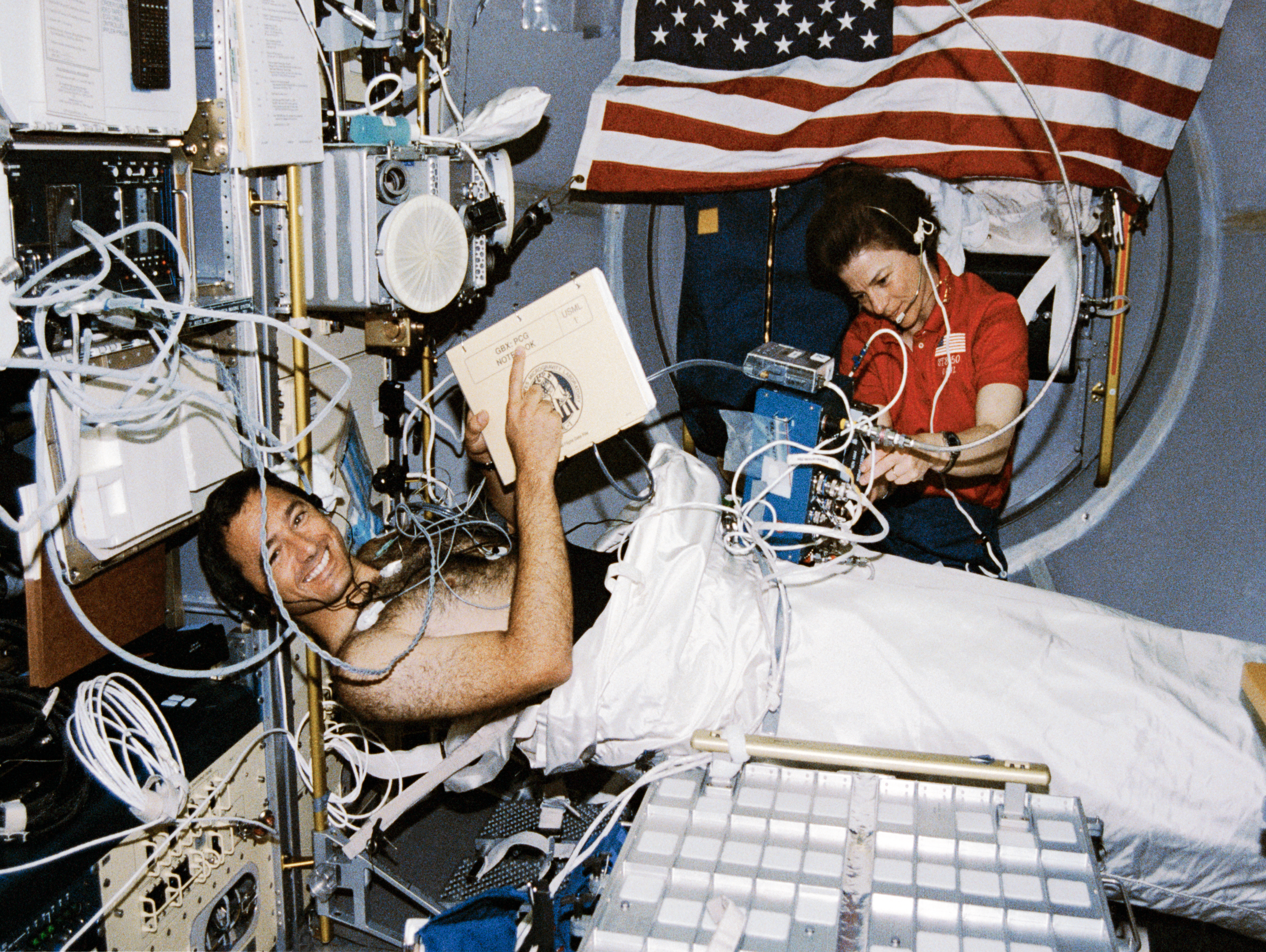
DeLucas and Dunbar in Spacelab with the Lower Body Negative Pressure device.

STS-50 not only marked the first U.S. Microgravity Laboratory-1 (USML-1) flight, but also the first Extended Duration Orbiter flight. To prepare for long-term (months) microgravity research aboard Space Station Freedom, scientists and NASA need practical experience in managing progressively longer times for their experiments. The Space Shuttle usually provides a week to ten days of microgravity. Thanks to the Extended Duration Orbiter kit, the Space Shuttle orbiter Columbia remained in orbit for almost 14 days and future missions with Columbia could last as long as a month. The kit consists of extra hydrogen and oxygen tanks for power production, extra nitrogen tanks for the cabin atmosphere, and an improved regeneration system for removing carbon dioxide from the cabin air.

One of the practical aspects of remaining in space longer will be the requirement to maintain crew member health and performance. During STS-50, crew members conducted biological tests as part of the EDO Medical Project. Crew members monitored their blood pressure and heart rate and took samples of the cabin atmosphere during the flight. They also evaluated the Lower Body Negative Pressure (LBNP) device as a countermeasure to the normal reduction of body fluids that takes place in space. If the beneficial effects of the LBNP could last for 24 hours, it would improve crew member performance on reentry and landing.

=== Other payloads ===
The STS-50 crew members also operated the Shuttle Amateur Radio Experiment (SAREX). Through the experiment, crew members were able to contact amateur radio operators, a Polynesian sailing vessel replica out in the Pacific Ocean, and selected schools around the world.

The Investigations into Polymer Membrane Processing (IPMP) experiment has flown previously on six Shuttle missions. It is used to study the formation of polymer membranes in microgravity with the aim of improving their quality and use as filters in biomedical and industrial processes.

== Mission insignia ==
The mission insignia shows the space shuttle in the typical flying position for microgravity. The USML banner extends from the payload bay, in which the Spacelab module with the text μg—the symbol for microgravity. Both the stars and stripes on the USML letters, as well as the highlighted United States on the Earth below the shuttle, depict the fact that it was an all-American science mission.

== Impacts with debris and micrometeoroids ==
Columbia's "stand-up" orbital attitude, although ideal for microgravity experiments, was very far from optimal from the point of view of D&M (Debris and Micrometeoroid) vulnerability. The orbiter received 40 radiation debris impacts, impacts on eight windows, and three impacts on the carbon-carbon wing leading edges.

== See also ==
- List of human spaceflights
- List of Space Shuttle missions
- Outline of space science
- Space Shuttle
