= Extended Duration Orbiter =

Space Shuttle hardware

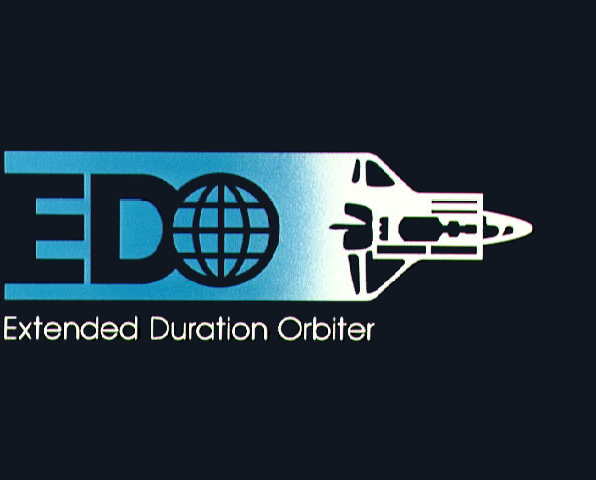
The insignia for Extended Duration Orbiter missions.

The Extended Duration Orbiter (EDO) program was a project by NASA to prepare for long-term (months) microgravity research aboard Space Station Freedom, which later evolved into the International Space Station. Scientists and NASA needed practical experience in managing progressively longer times for their experiments. The original Space Shuttle configuration usually provided a week to ten days of spaceflight. Several research projects and hardware components were part of the project, of which the EDO-pallet was one of the most visible, contracted by Rockwell International.

The first orbiter outfitted with the EDO hardware configuration was Endeavour, during its construction, and its last EDO flight was STS-67, in 1995. Endeavour's EDO modifications were removed in 1996 as part of routine maintenance, to reduce the orbiter's weight prior to STS-89. Columbia was outfitted for EDO flight during its maintenance period from August 10, 1991, through February 9, 1992, prior to STS-50, which was the first EDO flight. From 1992, through 1994, Atlantis went through a maintenance period, during which Atlantis was modified to have the provisions needed for EDO capability, but NASA chose not to proceed with the final modifications, and Atlantis never had EDO capability. The EDO-pallet used in these orbiter configurations was destroyed in the 2003 Columbia disaster.

== EDO Pallet ==
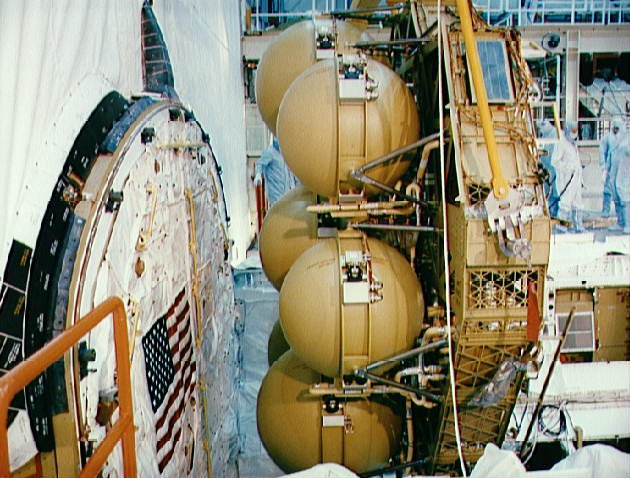
The EDO pallet mounted in the back of Columbia's payload bay

The Extended Duration Orbiter Cryogenic kit (EDO-pallet or CRYO) was a 15-foot-diameter (4.6 m) equipment assembly which attached vertically to the payload bay rear bulkhead of an orbiter, and allowed the orbiter to support a flight of up to 16 days duration. The equipment included cryogenic tanks, associated control panels, and avionics equipment. Although Atlantis was partially upgraded to accommodate the EDO, only Columbia and Endeavour actually flew with the pallet. The pallet made its debut on STS-50, and was lost on STS-107 in 2003.

Initially, NASA considered adding a second EDO pallet to Endeavour, placed in front of the first, for a total of thirteen tank sets, that would have allowed an orbiter to remain in space for 28 days, but managers decided against it when the International Space Station assembly began, and instead removed the EDO capability from the orbiter, to reduce its weight and allow it to carry more cargo to the ISS.

No replacement for the pallet was planned, since the Station-to-Shuttle Power Transfer System provided much of the same abilities, and the 2011 retirement of the shuttle fleet made it unnecessary.

=== Specifications ===
The EDO tanks stored 368 pounds (167 kg) of liquid hydrogen at −418 degrees Fahrenheit (−250.0 °C), and 3,124 pounds (1,417 kg) of liquid oxygen at −285 degrees Fahrenheit (−176.1 °C). Total empty weight of the system was 3,571 pounds (1,620 kg). When filled with cryogens, the system weight was approximately 7,000 pounds (3.2 t).

=== Use ===
The EDO pallet was designed to augment the orbiter's endurance for prolonged missions by supplying additional hydrogen and oxygen for its fuel cells. These fuel cells, in turn, converted hydrogen and oxygen into electrical energy essential for the orbiter's operations. For instance, during STS-80, 5,856 kWh was produced from 3,989 lb of oxygen and 502 lb of hydrogen. For STS-50, 6,204.7 kWh was generated from 4,367 lb of oxygen and 550 lb of hydrogen. In comparison, STS-77, a mission without the EDO pallet, yielded 3,924 kWh from 2,745 lb of oxygen and 346 lb of hydrogen.

Another byproduct of the fuel cell operation was potable water. STS-77 produced 3,091 lb, while missions utilizing the EDO pallet, such as STS-50 and STS-80, yielded 4,914.6 lb and 4,492 lb, respectively.

Missions incorporating the EDO pallet provided extended opportunities for scientific research. They enabled detailed studies in areas like microgravity, life sciences, terrestrial observations, and astronomical observations. They also facilitated an understanding of human adaptability in reduced gravity conditions.

The following missions used the EDO pallet:

EDO Flight	Shuttle	Mission	Launch Date	Duration	Primary Payload(s)
1	Columbia	STS-50	June 25, 1992	13 days, 19 hours, 30 minutes, 4 seconds	United States Microgravity Laboratory-1
2	Columbia	STS-58	October 18, 1993	14 days, 0 hours, 12 minutes, 32 seconds	Spacelab Life Sciences-2
3	Columbia	STS-62	March 4, 1994	13 days, 23 hours, 16 minutes, 41 seconds	United States Microgravity Payload-2
4	Columbia	STS-65	July 8, 1994	14 days, 17 hours, 55 minutes, 1 second	International Microgravity Laboratory-2
5	Endeavour	STS-67	March 2, 1995	16 days, 15 hours, 8 minutes, 48 seconds	ASTRO-2
6	Columbia	STS-73	October 20, 1995	15 days, 21 hours, 53 minutes, 16 seconds	United States Microgravity Laboratory-2
7	Columbia	STS-75	February 22, 1996	15 days, 17 hours, 40 minutes, 22 seconds	Tethered Satellite System-1R (reflight of Tethered Satellite System-1 on STS-46); United States Microgravity Payload-3
8	Columbia	STS-78	June 20, 1996	16 days, 21 hours, 48 minutes, 30 seconds	Life and Microgravity Spacelab
9	Columbia	STS-80	November 19, 1996	17 days, 15 hours, 53 minutes, 18 seconds	Wake Shield Facility; ORFEUS-SPAS II
10	Columbia	STS-83	April 4, 1997	3 days, 23 hours, 13 minutes, 38 seconds	Microgravity Science Laboratory-1 (Mission ended early due to a problem with one of Columbia's fuel cells.)
11	Columbia	STS-94	July 1, 1997	15 days, 16 hours, 45 minutes, 29 seconds	Microgravity Science Laboratory-1 (reflight of STS-83)
12	Columbia	STS-87	November 19, 1997	15 days, 16 hours, 35 minutes, 1 second	United States Microgravity Payload-4; SPARTAN-201
13	Columbia	STS-90	April 17, 1998	15 days, 21 hours, 50 minutes, 58 seconds	Neurolab
14	Columbia	STS-107	January 16, 2003	15 days, 22 hours, 20 minutes, 32 seconds	SPACEHAB Research Double Module; FREESTAR, Lost during reentry, Space Shuttle Columbia disaster

== EDO medical project ==
Prior to the EDO project, no shuttle had flown a mission longer than 10 days. Since space travelers may faint when they stand up (orthostatic intolerance) after returning to normal gravity even after short flights, and muscle strength may be reduced, the EDOMP project focused on ensuring that the crew could land the orbiter, and exit from it without help after a 16-day flight. Astronauts on 40 shuttle flights (STS-32 through STS-72) participated in 36 EDOMP investigations. The results of these investigations were used to make rules and recommendations for 16-day flights. Several types of exercise devices (i.e. a treadmill, a cycle ergometer, and a rower) were among the devices and procedures developed to prevent the de-conditioning of the body that occurs during space flight. The crew transport vehicles, in which astronauts were transported after landing, were built to enhance medical capabilities at the landing site, as well as crew comfort and safety. A database of 125 formal publications, and 299 abstracts, technical papers, and presentations, also resulted from the EDOMP. The project saw its successor in the ISS Medical Project.

== Other EDO projects and studies ==
- Manual Apparel Cleaning System - A system for laundering selected items of clothing.
- An automated Fault Detection, Isolation, and Reconfiguration-system (FDIR) that would support the shuttles for up to 28 days.
- Extended Duration Orbiter Waste Collection System. A similar system was later added to ISS as the ISS Waste Collector Subsystem.
- Extended Duration Orbiter Regenerable CO_{2} Removal System.
- Medical Extended Medical Enterprise (MEME).

== See also ==
- List of Space Shuttle missions
