= Silver Wings (service organization) =

American collegiate service organization

- Founded: 1951; 74 years ago University of Omaha
- Type: Service
- Affiliation: Independent
- Status: Active
- Emphasis: Air Force
- Scope: National
- Chapters: 37
- Former Name: Angel Flight
- Headquarters: United States
- Website: www.silver-wings.org

Silver Wings is an American service organization self-governed by college students. With minor supervision, Silver Wings works jointly with the Arnold Air Society (AAS) nationwide to promote leadership skills, military awareness, and professional development.

== History ==
Silver Wings, originally known as Angel Flight, was founded at the University of Omaha as a local auxiliary organization in 1951, and formed as a national organization in 1952. Starting out as an all-female organization, Angel Flight was more of a national idea with various names. While these organizations across the country had different names, they were all focused on helping their local AFROTC unit. In April 1957, representatives from 16 different groups came together at the 8th National Conclave of Arnold Air Society to join their purposes under a National Coordination Headquarters.

In the 1980s, local Angel Flight chapters were allowed to use the name "Silver Wings" as recognition for their growing diversity in membership. In 1995, the General Assembly of the yearly national conclave (NATCON) changed the organization's name to "Angel Flight-Silver Wings." Local chapters were allowed to use the name "Angel Flight," "Silver Wings," or "Angel Flight-Silver Wings."

Hoping to increase recruitment, Angel Flight-Silver Wings restructured the organization in 1996, changing their mission and goals away from being a military-support oriented organization to further diversify their organization. In 1998 the National Conclave changed the organization's name to "Silver Wings," functioning as a civilian organization focused on community service, leadership, and professional development.

== Membership ==
Silver Wings members must be an undergraduate or graduate student within the local chapter, and complete various workshops and projects. Honorary membership can be bestowed.

== Governance ==
The National Headquarters provides direction and focus for the entire organization. The nation is broken up into 11 regions. Region Presidents serve the chapters that lie within their region and communicate from chapters to national officers.

The National Headquarters is chosen each year by the General Assembly at NATCON, which takes place annually in spring, typically on Easter weekend. Silver Wings (SW) and Arnold Air Society (AAS) also jointly hold the National Conclave (NATCON) where all members of SW and AAS are invited to discuss matters within the organizations. During this event, business meetings are conducted and local chapters and regions vote on various resolutions and amendments to their manuals.

== Notable members ==
- Mark Mitchell Campbell, barnstormer, stuntman, and Lockheed executive
- Bonnie J. Dunbar, astronaut
- Wendy M. Masiello, United States general
