= Eugene H. Trinh =

Vietnamese-American astronaut and biochemist (born 1950)

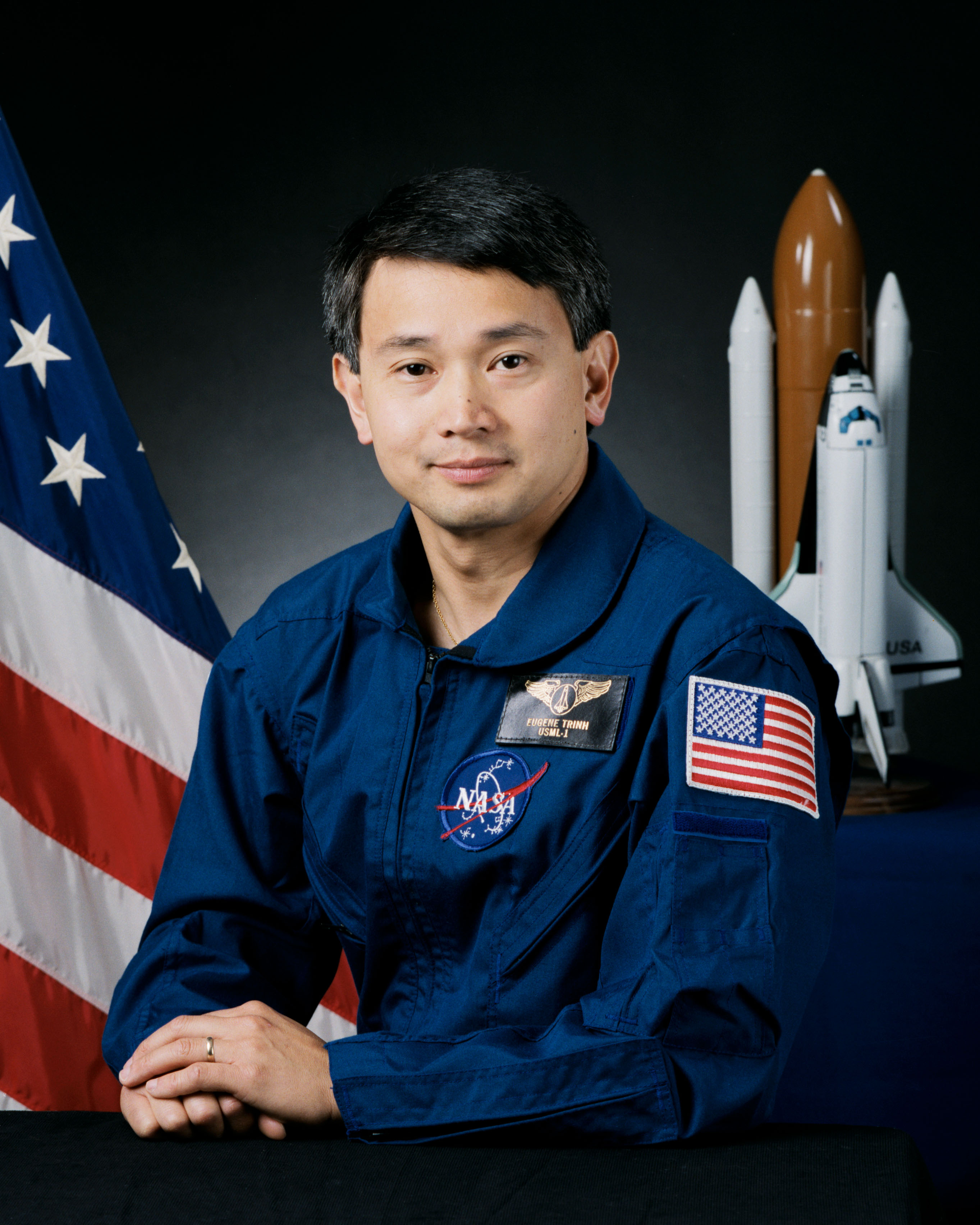
- Born: Eugene Huu-Chau Trinh; September 14, 1950 (age 76); Saigon, South Vietnam
- Citizenship: American
- Education: Columbia University; Yale University
- Occupation: Biochemist
- Space career

NASA Payload Specialist
- Time in space: 13 days 19 hours 30 minutes
- Missions: STS-50

Eugene Huu-Chau "Gene" Trinh (Vietnamese: Trịnh Hữu Châu, born September 14, 1950) is a Vietnamese American biochemist who flew aboard NASA Space Shuttle mission STS-50 as a Payload Specialist, becoming the first Vietnamese American astronaut in space and the second Vietnamese in space (after cosmonaut Phạm Tuân).

== Biography ==
Trinh was born in Saigon, South Vietnam. Trinh moved with his parents to Paris, France, when he was two years old. He came to the United States to study when he was 18 and later became an American citizen.

Trinh graduated from Lycee Michelet in Paris, France, in 1968 with a baccalaureate degree. He received a Bachelor of Science degree in Mechanical Engineering-Applied Physics from Columbia University in 1972. He then studied at Yale University, earning a Masters of Science in 1974, a Masters of Philosophy in 1975, and a Doctorate of Philosophy in Applied Physics in 1977.

== Career ==
Trinh served as the director of the physical sciences research division in the Biological and Physical Research Enterprise at NASA headquarters. He started with NASA in 1979, as a senior research scientist at the Jet Propulsion Laboratory. He conducted experimental and theoretical research in fluid dynamics, fundamental materials science, and levitation technology for 20 years. He performed hands-on experimental investigations in laboratories aboard the NASA KC-135 aircraft, and on the Space Shuttle Columbia.

Trinh was a payload specialist crew member on the STS-50/United States Microgravity Lab-1 Space Shuttle flight in 1992.

As director of the physical sciences research division at NASA, Trinh leads the effort to develop an innovative peer-reviewed scientific program focusing on the effects of gravity on physical, chemical, and biological systems. The results of this program will enable the human exploration and development of space, providing the scientific basis for technologies permitting humankind to explore the vast expanses of the Solar System and beyond.

In May 2004, Trinh received the Golden Torch Award from the Vietnamese American National Gala in Washington, D.C.

Trinh formerly resided in Culver City, California, but now makes his home in McLean, Virginia. He is married to the former Yvette Fabry and has one child.

== See also ==
- List of Asian American astronauts
- Phạm Tuân (first Vietnamese/Asian in space)
