= Lawrence J. DeLucas =

American astronaut and biochemist (born 1950)

Lawrence DeLucas
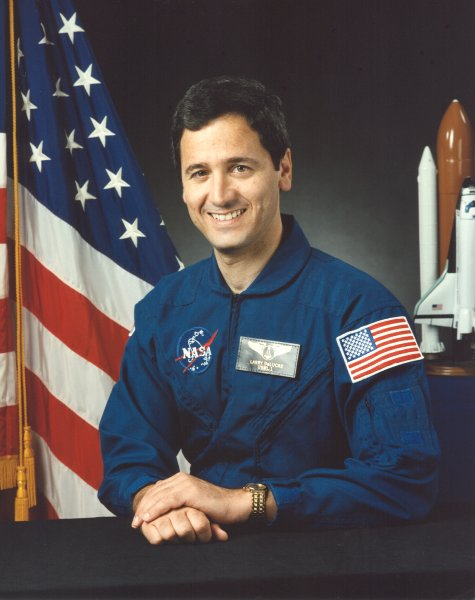
- Born: 11 July 1950 (age 76); Syracuse, New York
- Occupation: Biochemist
- Space career

NASA Payload Specialist
- Time in space: 13d 19h 30m
- Missions: STS-50
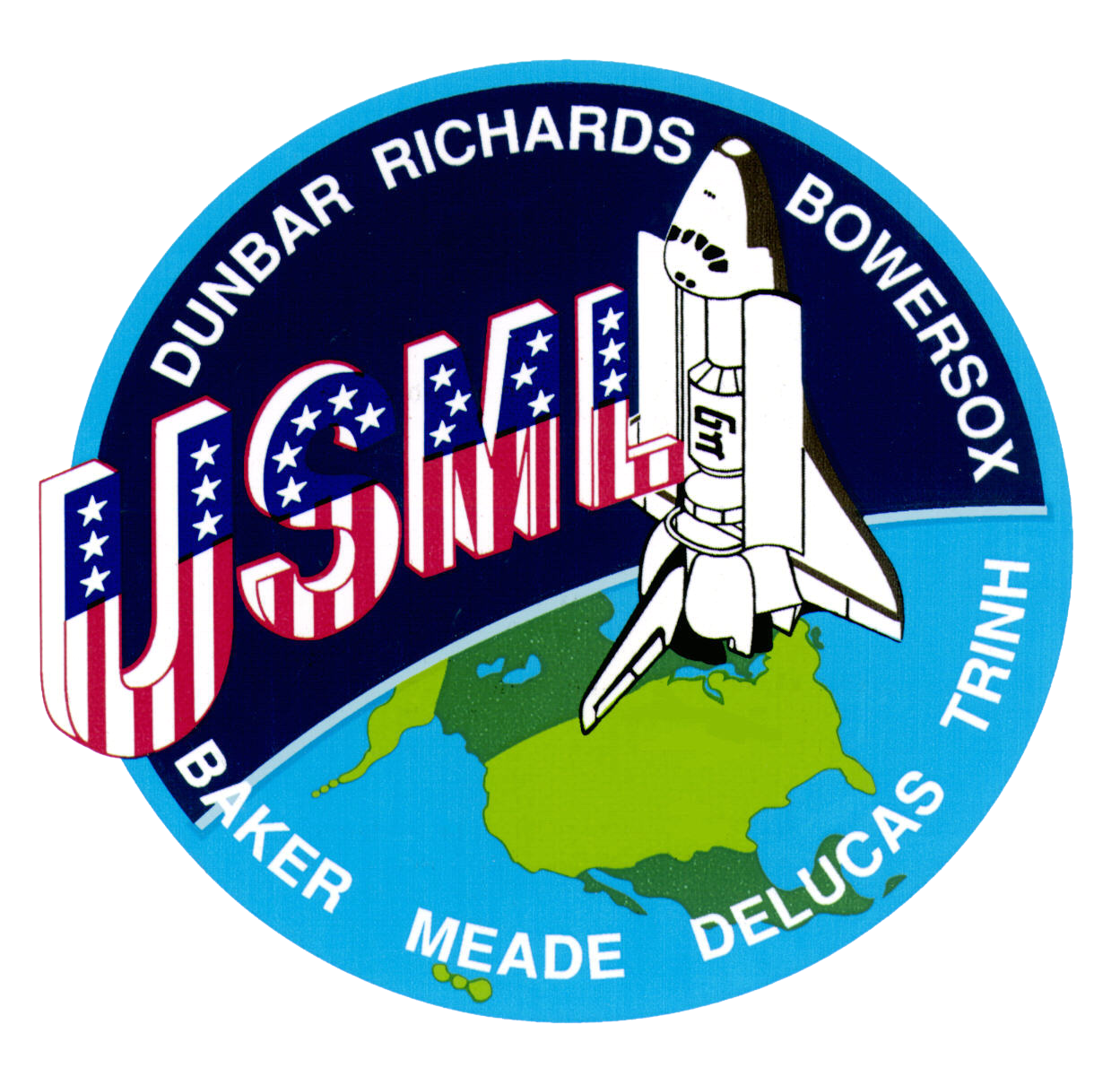
- Mission insignia

Lawrence James DeLucas is an American biochemist who flew aboard NASA Space Shuttle mission STS-50 as a Payload Specialist. He was born on July 11, 1950, in Syracuse, New York, and is married with three children.

== Education ==
DeLucas attended the University of Alabama at Birmingham as an undergraduate and graduate student, receiving doctorates in optometry and biochemistry in 1981.

== Publications ==
He has published 163 research articles in refereed scientific journals, is co-author of 2 books, and co-inventor on 43 patents.

== Spaceflight ==
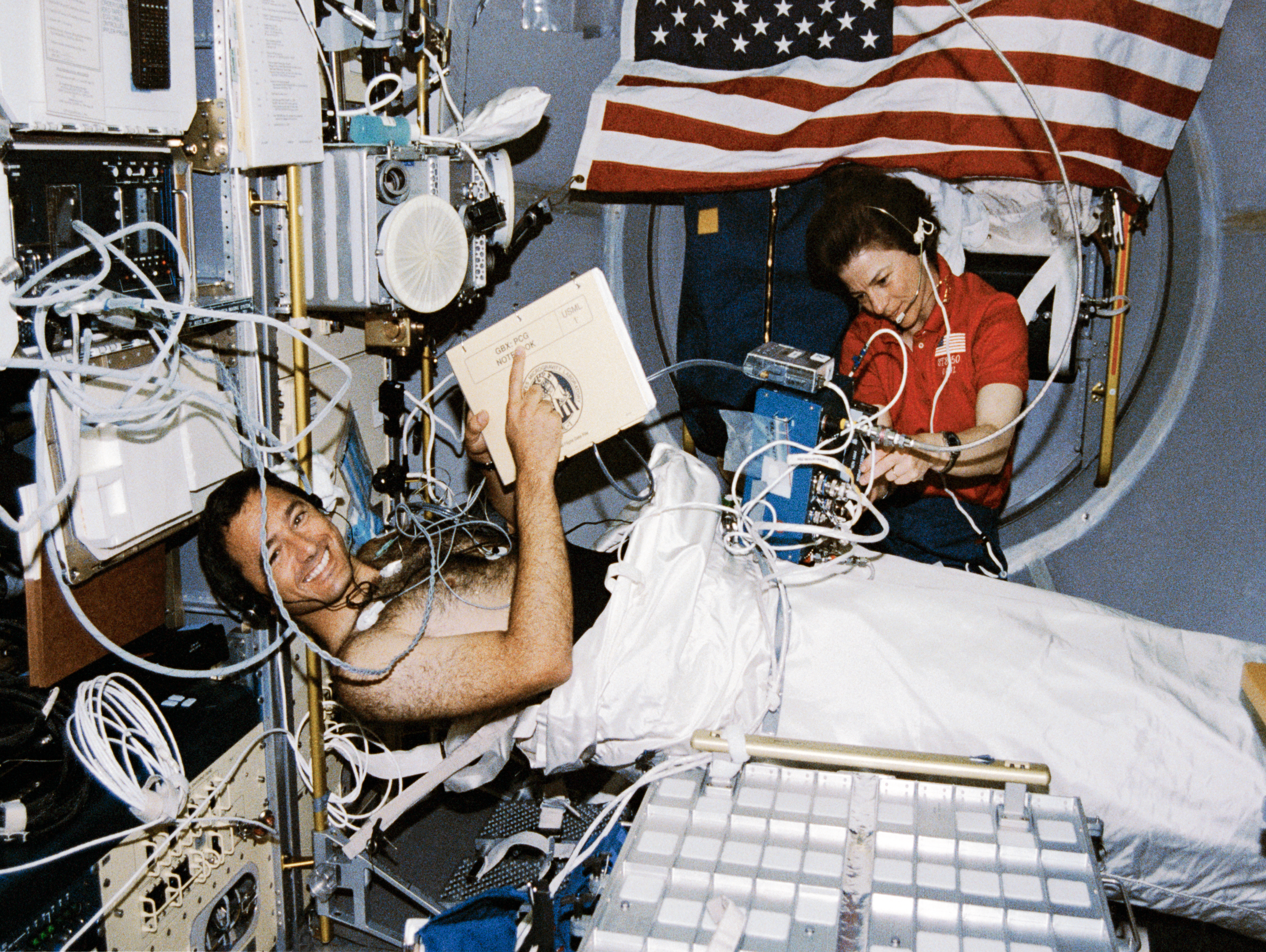
DeLucas and Bonnie J. Dunbar in Spacelab with the Lower Body Negative Pressure device

DeLucas was a member of the crew of Space Shuttle Columbia for STS-50 (June 25-July 9, 1992), the United States Microgravity Laboratory-1 (USML-1) Spacelab mission. Over a two-week period, the crew conducted a wide variety of experiments relating to materials processing and fluid physics. At mission conclusion, DeLucas had traveled over 5.7 million miles in 221 Earth orbits, and had logged over 331 hours in space.
