= Ellen S. Baker =

American physician and astronaut (born 1953)

Ellen Baker
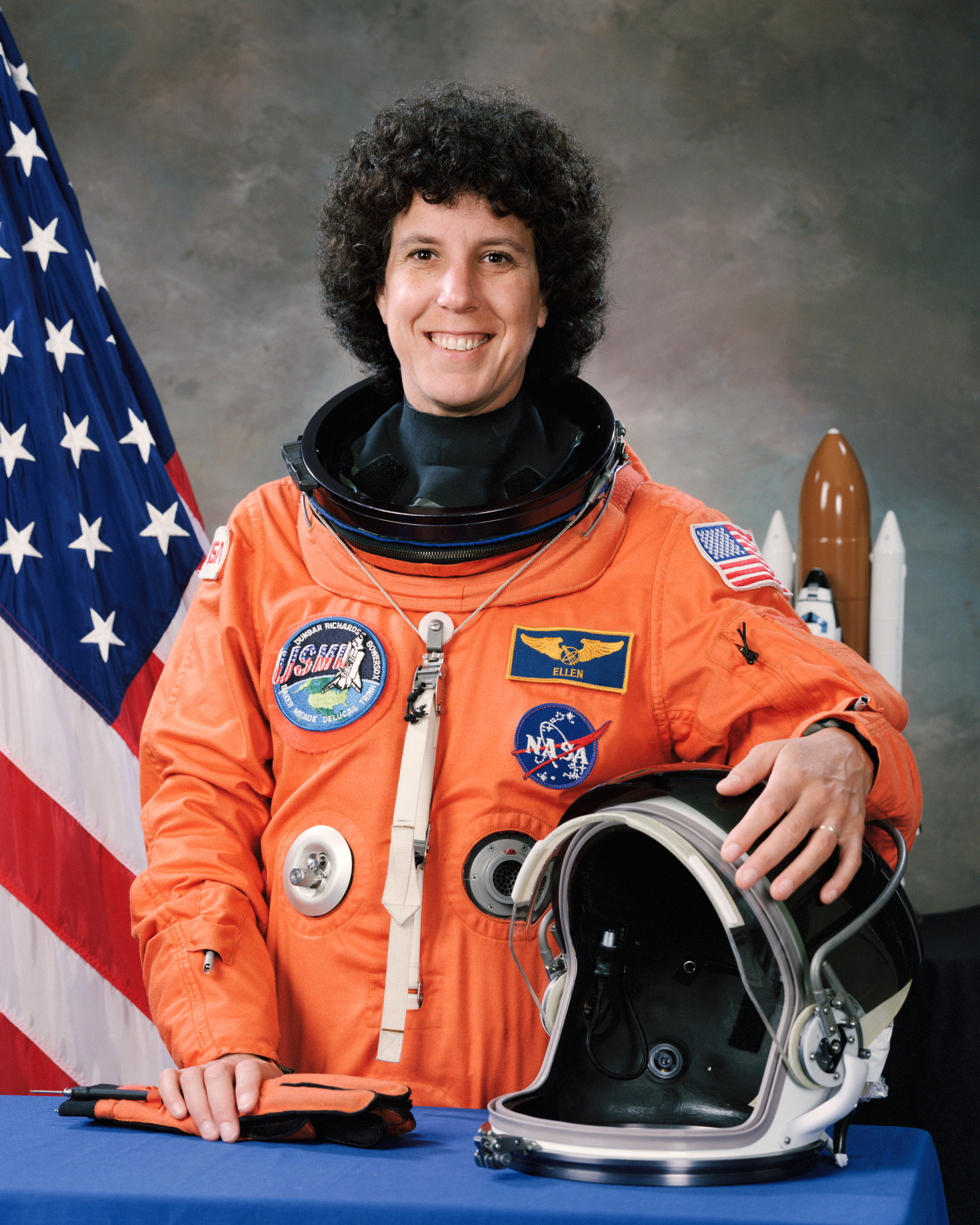
- Born: Ellen Louise Shulman; April 27, 1953 (age 73); Fayetteville, North Carolina, U.S.
- Education: University at Buffalo (BS); Cornell University (MD); University of Texas, Houston (MPH)
- Relatives: Claire Shulman (mother)
- Space career

NASA astronaut
- Time in space: 28d 14h 31m
- Selection: NASA Group 10 (1984)
- Missions: STS-34; STS-50; STS-71

Ellen Louise Shulman Baker (born April 27, 1953) is an American physician and a former NASA astronaut. Baker is a veteran of three shuttle flights and logged more than 686 hours in space. Baker served as Chief of the Education/Medical Branch of the NASA Astronaut Office until her retirement in 2011 after more than 30 years of service to NASA.

== Family ==
The daughter of physician Mel and politician Claire Shulman, she was born in Fayetteville, North Carolina, but raised in New York City. She is married to Kenneth J. Baker. They have two daughters.

== Education ==
Baker graduated from:

- Bayside High School in Queens in 1970.
- University at Buffalo, Bachelor of Arts degree in geology in 1974
- Cornell University, doctorate in medicine in 1978
- University of Texas School of Public Health, Master's Degree in Public Health in 1994

== Medical career ==
After completing medical school, Baker trained in internal medicine at the University of Texas Health Science Center, San Antonio, Texas. In 1981, after three years of residency training in internal medicine, she was certified by the American Board of Internal Medicine.

== NASA career ==
In 1981, following her parents, Baker joined NASA as a medical officer at the Lyndon B. Johnson Space Center. That same year, she graduated from the Air Force Aerospace Medicine Course at Brooks Air Force Base, San Antonio, Texas. Prior to her selection as an astronaut candidate, she served as a physician in the Flight Medicine Clinic at the Johnson Space Center. Selected by NASA in May 1984, Baker became an astronaut in June 1985. Since then, she has had a variety of jobs at NASA in support of the Space Shuttle program and Space Station development. She was a mission specialist on STS-34 in 1989, STS-50 in 1992, and STS-71 in 1995 and has logged over 686 hours in space. She then served as Chief of the Astronaut Office Education/Medical Branch.

=== Spaceflight experience ===
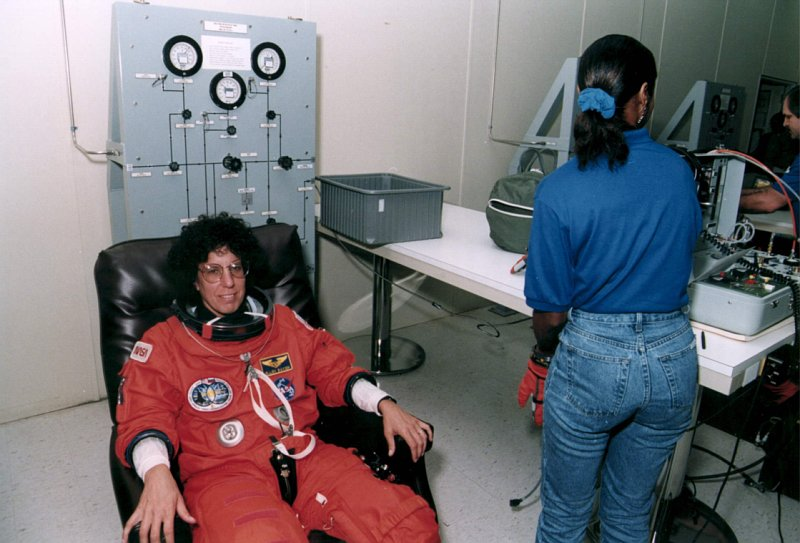
Baker suiting up prior to STS-71 launch

STS-34 Atlantis (October 18–23, 1989) launched from the Kennedy Space Center in Florida, and landed at Edwards Air Force Base in California. During the mission, the crew deployed the Galileo probe to explore Jupiter, operated the Shuttle Solar Backscatter Ultraviolet Instrument (SSBUV) to map atmospheric ozone, conducted several medical experiments, and numerous scientific experiments. Mission objectives were accomplished in 79 orbits of the Earth, traveling 1.8 million miles in 119 hours and 41 minutes.

STS-50 Columbia (June 25, 1992 – July 9, 1992) launched and landed at the Kennedy Space Center in Florida. STS-50 was the first flight of the United States Microgravity Laboratory and the first Extended Duration Orbiter flight. Over a two-week period, the crew conducted scientific experiments involving crystal growth, fluid physics, fluid dynamics, biological science, and combustion science. Mission objectives were accomplished in 221 orbits of the Earth, traveling 5.7 million miles in 331 hours 30 seconds and 4 minutes in space.

STS-71 Atlantis (June 27 – July 7, 1995) launched from the Kennedy Space Center with a seven-member crew and returned there with an eight-member crew. STS-71 was the first Space Shuttle mission to dock with the Russian Space Station Mir, and involved an exchange of crews. The Atlantis Space Shuttle was modified to carry a docking system compatible with the Russian Mir Space Station. It also carried a Spacelab module in the payload bay in which the crew performed various life sciences experiments and data collections. Mission accomplished in 153 orbits of the Earth, traveling 4.1 million miles in 235 hours and 23 minutes.
