= Arnold Air Society =

Honor society for U.S. Air Force officer candidates

- Founded: May 1947; 79 years ago University of Cincinnati
- Type: Honor
- Affiliation: Independent
- Status: Active
- Emphasis: AFROTC, USAFA
- Scope: National
- Motto: "The warrior who cultivates his mind polishes his arms"
- Colors: Red, White, Blue, and Gold
- Symbol: White Star and Cardinal Ball
- Flower: "Crimson Glory" Rose
- Chapters: 168
- Headquarters: 9006 Judiciary Drive; Spotsylvania, Virginia 22553; United States
- Website: aas-sw.org/arnold-air-society

The Arnold Air Society (AAS) is a professional, honorary, service organization. AAS is open to officer candidates in Air Force Reserve Officer Training Corps (AFROTC) and at the United States Air Force Academy (USAFA), and is formally affiliated with the Air Force Association (AFA). In addition to AFROTC or Academy commitments, AAS members must complete candidate training, attend meetings, and contribute to their respective Squadrons and ROTC detachments. Doing so enhances the officer candidate experience of cadets as well as builds stronger leadership, organizational, and professional skills.

== History ==
Arnold Air Society was first proposed as an idea for an extracurricular organization by ROTC cadets at the University of Cincinnati in the summer of 1947. After having their idea approved by active members of the Air Force, the cadets wrote a constitution for their new, honorary society. They called it the “Arnold Society of Air Cadets” in honor of General Henry “Hap” Arnold, the only 5-Star General of the Air Force.

The first Honorary Sponsor of Arnold Air Society was Mrs. Eleanor Arnold. General James Doolittle was chosen to be the Honorary Commander following General Henry Arnold’s death in 1950. Following the first National Conclave, the society's official name became Arnold Air Society, a deviation from the original title.

Since its inception, Arnold Air Society grew quickly; by 1955 it had 185 squadrons across the United States.

The society was officially recognized by the Air Force in April 1948. It was then the goal of the society to recruit and build more squadrons to make the society bigger. Within the next year, an additional twenty squadrons were formed across the country.

== Symbols ==
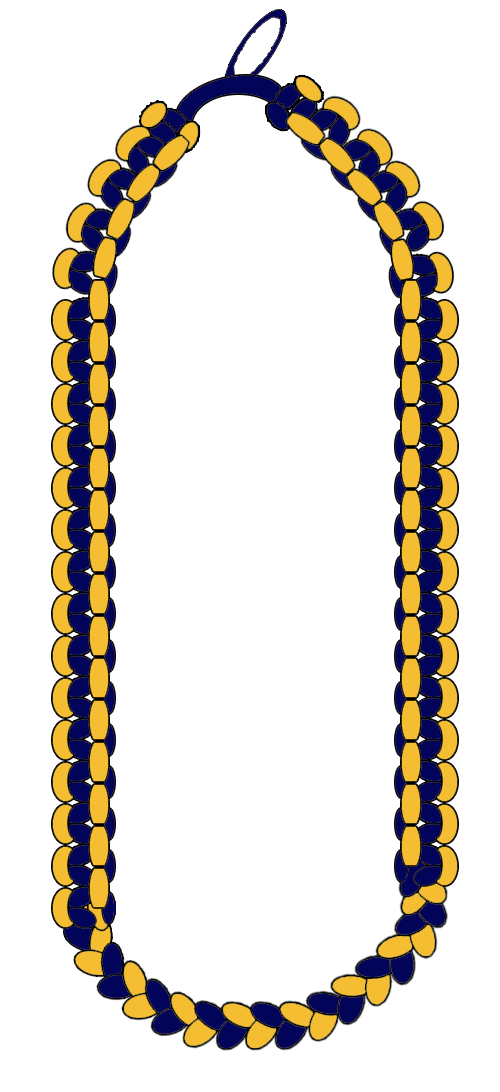
Arnold Air Society Fourragère

The badge of the society is an Air Force star, white, with a cardinal red ball resting on opposed wings of the Air Force, set in gold. Under this are two gold bars with the inscription of the name of the society, the Arnold Air Society, superimposed. Active members wear an insignia on their uniforms consisting of a blue and gold fourragère.

Arnold Air Society Ribbon

The ribbon is regulation size utilizing four colors. In the center are alternating stripes of red and blue" two active blue, one red bounded by white, with yellow-orange border stripes.

The AAS Flower is the "Crimson Glory" Rose. This flower was adopted in 1956 because Mrs. Arnold, having been presented with a silver bud vase by the Air Force Association at their 1955 National Convention, said she knew what she would put in it: the "Crimson Glory" rose because it always reminded her of the Air Force since it had Japanese Beetles during World War II.

The AAS motto is "The warrior who cultivates his mind polishes his arms" (Duc de Boufflers).

The AAS colors are red, white, blue, and gold. White represents the purity of our intent, red symbolizes the bloodshed by Americans fighting for freedom, blue is the color of the sky in which we fly, and gold represents the wings with which we fly and warrior courage.

== Activities ==
The Arnold Memorial Scholarship is a cash award that is given annually, rotating between areas of the country, to the outstanding first-year member of eligible squadrons.

== Governance ==
The first national officers, as well as their successors, were chosen from the University of Cincinnati Squadron until 1954. Within five years this system gave way to an elected national structure. A National Conclave (NATCON) is held annually to review the policies and procedures of the society. The first NATCON was held at the University of Cincinnati in 1950. Since that time, all Squadrons from around the nation are invited to the gathering where they vote on new leadership for the upcoming year. The 75th NATCON was celebrated April 15-19th, 2022 in Washington, D.C.

In 1956 AAS earned affiliation with the Air Force Association. At the fourth and fifth NATCONs, it was proposed that the organizational structure of the society be changed, a structure that includes an executive board, responsible for national leadership and organization between NATCON events. This remains the governance structure to the present day. The executive board consists of the AAS National Commander and the several AAS Area Commanders, meeting twice annually, once at the AAS NATCON and once at the Air Force Association National Convention. At these early meetings the primary awards and policies were established which are still in practice today.

== Membership ==
Each prospective member must belong to a local AFROTC detachment and at least meet those academic and physical standards. If these criteria are met, then the individual can enter the Candidate Training Program. During the six to eleven-week AAS training program (at individual squadrons' discretion), the candidate must attend at least 90% of all candidate activities and complete at least one service project that benefits their detachment, university campus, or their community. The candidate must take a National Test at the conclusion of their candidate training program and pass the test with a score of at least 80%.

The society maintains four classes of membership:

- Active – A cadet member who has paid national dues and is in good standing with the squadron (including GPA and other requirements per AASMAN-1 para 2.2.4).
- Inactive – A cadet who is inactive per squadron by-laws (probation, etc.) but continues to pay national dues and thus retains the right to regain active membership. Inactive cadets may not wear the AAS cord or device but may wear the AAS membership ribbon.
- Associate – Members of a group that provide support to AAS in the accomplishment of its objectives, as designated by the squadron and approved by the executive board of directors. Members of Silver Wings gain associate membership into AAS upon payment of SW dues.
- Honorary – This level of membership is awarded to an individual who is not eligible for active membership but has contributed greatly to the organization. Honorary membership is a lifetime award.

== Chapters ==
The society has chartered 168 chapters or squadrons.

== Notable members ==
- Jeran Akers, Mayor of Plano, Texas
- John M. Fabian, astronaut
- M. J. Hegar, politician and author
- Abraham Lavender, sociologist
- Ellison Onizuka, astronaut and engineer

== See also ==
- Silver Wings, Arnold Air Society's sister organization
