= Vladimir Pletser =

Belgian astronaut

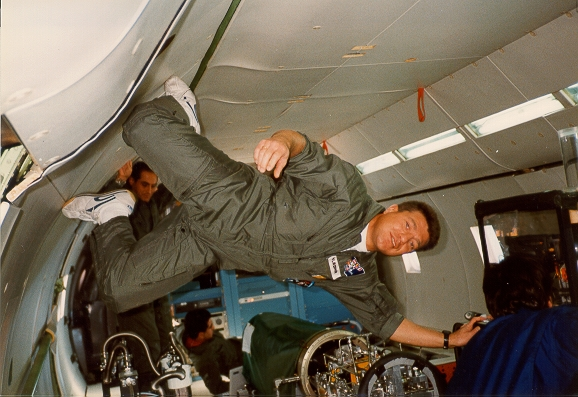
Vladimir Pletser in free-float during parabolic flights aboard the NASA DC9/30 in October 1995.

Vladimir Pletser (born 28 February 1956) is Director of Space Training Operations at Blue Abyss since 2018, where he is in charge of developing astronaut training programs. From 2016 to early 2018, he was a Visiting Professor and Scientific Adviser at the Technology and Engineering Centre for Space Utilization (CSU) of the Chinese Academy of Sciences in Beijing, China. He supported the preparation of scientific experiments in microgravity for the Chinese Tiangong space station and for aircraft parabolic flights. He worked previously from 1985 till early 2016 as a senior Physicist Engineer at the European Space Research and Technology Centre (ESTEC) of ESA.

He is an expert in microgravity during aircraft parabolic flights for which he holds a world record. He is known as ‘Mister Parabolic Flights’, ‘Mister Parabolas’, ‘Homo Parabolicus’ or ‘Mister Microgravity’.

An astronaut candidate for Belgium since 1991, he spent two months in training in 1995 at NASA's Johnson Space Center in Houston. Selected by the Mars Society in 2001, he participated in three international campaigns of crewed Mars mission simulations.

== Early life ==
Pletser was born in Brussels, Belgium.

Graduated in Latin-Mathematics from the Institut Saint-Boniface of Brussels in 1973 and in Special Scientific from the Collège Saint-Michel of Brussels in 1974; graduated from the Université Catholique de Louvain (UCL) in Louvain-la-Neuve, Belgium, as civil engineer in mechanics, specialism dynamics and systems (1979), Master in physics in space geodesy (1980), and Ph.D. in physics in astronomy and astrophysics (1990).

== Organisations ==
International Academy of Astronautics; International Astronautical Federation; Committee on Space Research (COSPAR); European Low Gravity Research Association; European Physical Society; Belgian Physical Society; Société royale belge d'Astronomie, de Météorologie et de Physique du Globe; American Mathematical Society; Belgian Mathematical Society; British Interplanetary Society; Association of Mars Explorers; The Mars Society; Mars Society Belgium; Euro Space Society; European Interplanetary Free Floaters; The Society of Interplanetary Free Floaters and other scientific and technical organizations.

== Career ==
Pletser worked as Research Engineer from 1980 to 1981 at the Department of External Geophysics of the Royal Meteorological Institute of Belgium on the ionospheric Doppler effect, and, from 1981 to 1982, at the Faculty of Agronomy of the Université Catholique de Louvain on problems of applied statistics, mathematical modeling and computer simulation. In 1982, he became assistant professor at the Faculty of Sciences of the Université Catholique de Louvain and detached at the University of Kinshasa, Congo (ex-Zaire), where he lectured until 1985 in Physics, Applied Mathematics, Astronomy and Geophysics.

=== Career at ESA ===
In 1985, Pletser joined the Microgravity Project and Platform Division in the Human Spaceflight and Operations Directorate at ESA’s ESTEC in Noordwijk, Netherlands.

=== Development of scientific instrumentation ===
Since 1985, he has followed the technical development of scientific payloads and was directly involved in 30 microgravity experiments carried out during space missions as Experiment Coordinator and Responsible for ground operations for experiments:

1. in fluid physics with the Advanced Fluid Physics Module on Spacelab D2 - STS-55 mission of April 1993, and the Bubble, Drop and Particle Unit on Spacelab LMS – STS-78 mission of June 1996.
2. in protein crystallization with the Advanced Protein Crystallization Facility on Spacehab-STS-95 mission of October 1998, and the Protein Crystallisation Diagnostics Facility (PCDF) that flew aboard the ISS Columbus module (STS-122) from February 2008 to July 2009 (STS-119/STS-127).
3. on zeolites with the instruments Zeogrid in the ISS Russian Zvezda module in October 1992 and Nanoslab in the ISS Destiny module in October 1992 and October 1993.
4. on symbiotic processes between fishes and algae with the instrument AquaHab aboard the Russian satellite Foton M3 in September 2007.

=== Parabolic flights ===
From 1985 till early 2016, Pletser was responsible for ESA aircraft parabolic flight campaigns for short-duration microgravity experiments.

==== ESA Research and Student campaigns ====
He organized and led 65 ESA microgravity research campaigns for physical, life sciences, and technology experiments with NASA's KC-135/930 from 1985 to 1988, CNES’s Caravelle from 1989 to 1995, the Russian Gagarin Cosmonaut Training Center’s Ilyushin Il-76MDK in 1994, the Dutch NLR Cessna Citation II in 2001, the CNES-ESA’s Airbus A300 ZERO-G from 1997 to 2014, and the Airbus A310 ZERO-G since 2015. In 2011 and 2012, he organized and led with CNES and DLR the first two Joint European Partial-g Parabolic Flight campaigns for research at Moon and Mars gravity levels with the Airbus A300 ZERO-G.

From 1994 to 2006, he took part in the organization and the flights of 8 ESA Student campaigns with CNES’s Caravelle in 1994, NASA’s KC-135/931 in 1995 and the Airbus A300 ZERO-G from 2000 to 2006. Since 2010, he participates in ESA's ‘Fly Your Thesis ’ programme, inviting European University students to submit experiment proposals related to their thesis research. The selected experiments take then part in research campaigns.

==== Brussels and Belgium student campaigns ====
In 2002, he initiated a new project in Belgium, to have secondary school students flying in weightlessness during ESA Student campaigns. Collaborating with the Region of Brussels-Capital and the Euro Space Society, he organized a contest for secondary schools in Brussels inviting students to propose experiments to be realized in microgravity. Five teams of Brussels secondary schools took part in the third ESA Student campaign in July 2003 aboard the Airbus A300 ZERO-G operating for the first time out of France and landing in Brussels. This pedagogical project encountered such a large success that it was repeated in 2006 with the Belgian Federal Science Policy Office and the Euro Space Society for secondary school students of the whole of Belgium. In July 2006, six teams of Belgian secondary schools participated in the ninth ESA Student campaign with the Airbus A300 landing again in Brussels.

==== Participation in other campaigns ====
Pletser was invited to participate in several other campaigns. In 1992, he participated in a DLR campaign aboard NASA's KC-135/930 in Houston to train German astronauts on AFPM operations prior to the Spacelab D2 - STS-55 mission. In 1993, he participated in parabolic flights aboard a Fouga Magister of the Belgian Air Force to measure microgravity levels during flights. In 1995, he was invited by NASA to participate in a campaign aboard the DC-9/30 of the Lewis Research Center to prepare a BDPU experiment for the Spacelab LMS - STS-78 mission. In 1999, he was invited to participate in two campaigns of the CNES and the DLR with the Airbus A300 ZERO-G as subject of a medical experiment. In 2004, he was invited to fly aboard the Austrian Short Skyvan aircraft. In 2011, the Canadian Space Agency invited him to participate in a series of parabolic flights aboard the Falcon 20 in Ottawa to support a combustion experiment. In 2016, he participated as a visiting professor in the Space Studies Programme (SSP-16) of the International Space University (ISU) taking place at the Technion in Haifa, Israël. He takes part in a series of parabolic flights on board a Grob G103a Twin II glider organized by ISU's Space Sciences Department, performing several experiments proposed by ISU students, conducting therefore the first scientific parabolic flights in the Middle East.

==== Number of experiments and parabolas ====
During the 90 campaigns in which he took part, he supervised a total of 1000 microgravity experiments. He was Principal Investigator of 11 experiments of micro-accelerometric measurement of microgravity levels and of 2 fluid physics experiments. He participated as operator in 79 physical science experiments and as subject in 95 medical and physiological experiments in preparation for several missions on Spacelab, Spacehab, the Russian space station Mir, and the International Space Station. He accumulated 7389 parabolas, totaling 39h 34m in weightlessness, equivalent to 26.3 Earth orbits, more than the first American, the first Russian, or the first Chinese astronauts. He accumulated a total of 53m in Martian gravity and 50m in lunar gravity during partial-g parabolic flights.

==== World record for the number of aircraft in parabolic flight ====
Pletser is the only person in the world having flown parabolas on 14 different aircraft: NASA's KC-135/930, KC-135/931, and DC-9/30; the ESA–CNES–DLR’s Airbus A310 ZERO-G; the CNES-ESA’s Airbus A300 ZERO-G; the CNES’s Caravelle; the Russian Gagarin Cosmonaut Training Center Ilyushin Il-76MDK; the Canadian Space Agency’s Falcon 20; the Dutch NLR Cessna Citation II; a Fouga Magister of the Belgian Air Force; the Austrian Short Skyvan; a Grob G103a Twin II glider; an ASK21 glider; and a Cessna 150. He holds the official Guinness World Record for the most aircraft flown in parabolic flight (nine), awarded in 2010 before his participation in the flights aboard the Falcon 20 in 2011, the Airbus A310 since 2015, the Grob G103a Twin II glider in 2016, and the ASK21 glider in 2018.

== Mars Crewed Mission Simulation campaigns ==
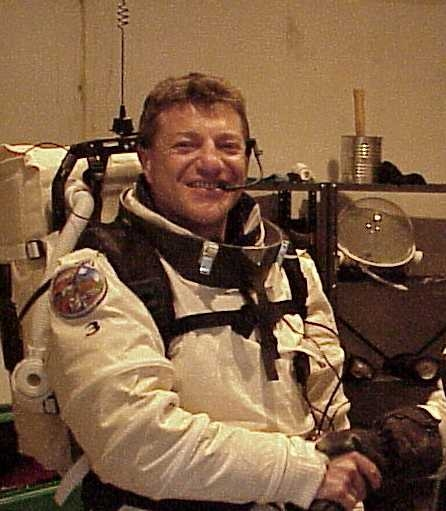
Vladimir Pletser in Martian Extra-vehicular suit at the FMARS

In 2001, Pletser was selected by the Mars Society among 250 candidates to participate in July 2001 in the first international Mars crewed mission simulation campaign at the Flashline Mars Arctic Research Station (FMARS) on the Devon Island in the Canadian Arctic with the FMARS-2 crew. He conducted an experiment aiming at detecting subsurface water by a seismic method. Invited again by The Mars Society, he participated in April 2002 in a second international crewed Mars mission simulation campaign in the Mars Desert Research Station (MDRS) in the Utah Desert with the crew MDRS-5 in strict isolation for two weeks. He was responsible for a psychological experiment on growing plants in the Mars habitat. During these two missions, he kept a diary at the FMARS and at the MDRS. He published a book about these two simulations. In 2009, in the frame of ESA's EuroGeoMars project to study human and scientific aspects of future crewed missions on extra-planetary surfaces, he participated in a third Martian simulation campaign at the MDRS as Crew Commander of Crew MDRS-76. He was responsible for a series of experiments on human crew aspects. During these three campaigns, he participated in a total of 36 experiments in geophysics, biology, navigation and reconnaissance, psychology and human factors. He accumulated a total of 44h 30m of simulated Extra-vehicular activity (EVA) time during 16 simulated EVA expeditions, including 9 as Commander.

== ESA and NASA astronaut selections ==
Pletser was selected in May 1991 by Belgium among 550 candidates as laboratory specialist astronaut candidate, with four other candidates, including Marianne Merchez and Frank De Winne, but he was not retained at the end of the ESA selection in May 1992. In May 1992, he applied to NASA as Payload Specialist astronaut candidate for the 2nd International Microgravity Laboratory (IML-2) Spacelab - STS-65 mission. Although recommended by members of the IML-2 Mission Investigator Working Group, his application was not considered by NASA. In January 1995, he was officially presented by Belgium as a Payload Specialist astronaut candidate for NASA’s Life and Microgravity Spacelab (LMS) - STS-78 mission. Four other candidates were presented respectively by the French Space Agency (CNES), the Canadian Space Agency (CSA), the Italian Space Agency (ASI) and ESA. After recommendation of the LMS Mission Investigator Working Group, the five candidates reported in March 1995 to NASA's Johnson Space Center for medical examinations and information sessions on medical experiments. Pletser passed successfully the medical selection and was unofficially informed that one of the places as alternate Payload Specialist astronaut would be proposed to him, having received the most recommendations of the LMS Mission Investigator Working Group. He started with the three other selected candidates two months of training at NASA's Johnson Space Center, at the Payload Crew Training Complex of NASA's Marshall Space Flight Center in Huntsville, at ESTEC and in several American university laboratories. However, NASA announced in May 1995 the selection of Dr. Jean-Jacques Favier (CNES) and Dr. Robert Thirsk (CSA) as Payload Specialist astronauts, and Dr Luca Urbani (ASI) and Mr. Pedro Duque (ESA) as alternate Payload Specialist astronauts.

== Academic and scientific career ==
Vladimir Pletser in 2026

Pletser is visiting professor at several universities in Europe, Africa, Asia, and America. He has given several hundreds of conferences, seminars, and invited lectures in microgravity research, astronautics, astronomy, geophysics, Mars exploration, and SETI in thirty universities and academies and for schools and the general public in Europe, Africa and Asia. As part of the awareness program for youth scientific and technical education and careers of the Government of the Brussels-Capital Region, 16,000 school students of Brussels attended his conferences between 2001 and 2011. His theoretical research on the cosmogony of the Solar System led to the publication in 1990 of a doctoral thesis on distance relations among planets and satellites, where the radial positions of the new satellites and rings of Uranus and Neptune are calculated before their discovery by the Voyager 2 probe. In 1998, he demonstrated the hypothesis that the Ishango bone, the oldest mathematical tool of humankind, is a primitive calculator in bases 6 and 12. Having been subject of an electroencephalographic experiment in parabolic flights in 1991, he took part in the result analysis and proposed a new method based on the chaotic nonlinear dynamics, yielding in 1999 to the awarding of a patent. He is pursuing research in Number Theory, on Generalised Mersenne numbers, on sums of powers of consecutive integers, on multiple of triangular numbers, on characteristics of Pell's equation solutions. He is a regular contributor to the On-Line Encyclopedia of Integer Sequences.

== Awards and honors ==
- ESA Academy Certificates for Contribution to ESA/ELGRA Gravity-Related Summer Schools (2018-2023)
- International Academy of Astronautics 2023 Life Sciences Book Award (2023)
- International Academy of Astronautics and Chinese Society of Astronautics Keynote Speech Award (2019)
- International Academy of Astronautics 2017 Engineering Sciences Book Award as co-Author (2017)
- Chinese Academy of Sciences Certificate of Achievement and Visiting Fellowship Award (2016)
- Outstanding Contribution in Reviewing for Acta Astronautica (2015)
- World Record for most aircraft flown in parabolic flights (2010)
- Gold (2010) and Silver (2003) Medals for parabolic flights on Airbus A300 ZERO-G
- Nominated among the 200 celebrities of Brussels,
- ESA Director General Medal for 20 years of service at ESA (2005)
- ESA Professional Award (2000) and ESA Invention Award for a filed patent (2000)
- Nominated Science Ambassador by the Minister-President of the Brussels-Capital Region for the Science Awareness School Programme (2000)
- ESA certificates of recognition for contributions to successes of Foton M3 (2008), Euromir-94 (1995), Spacelab D2 – STS-55 (1993) missions
- NASA certificate of recognition for contribution to the Spacelab LMS - STS-78 mission success (1996);
- DLR certificate of recognition for contribution to the Spacelab D2 – STS-55 mission success (1993);
- Co-recipient of the Best Player Award of the South African Rugby Union during Belgium's National Team tour (1977)
