= James D. Halsell =

American astronaut, convicted of manslaughter (born 1956)

James Halsell
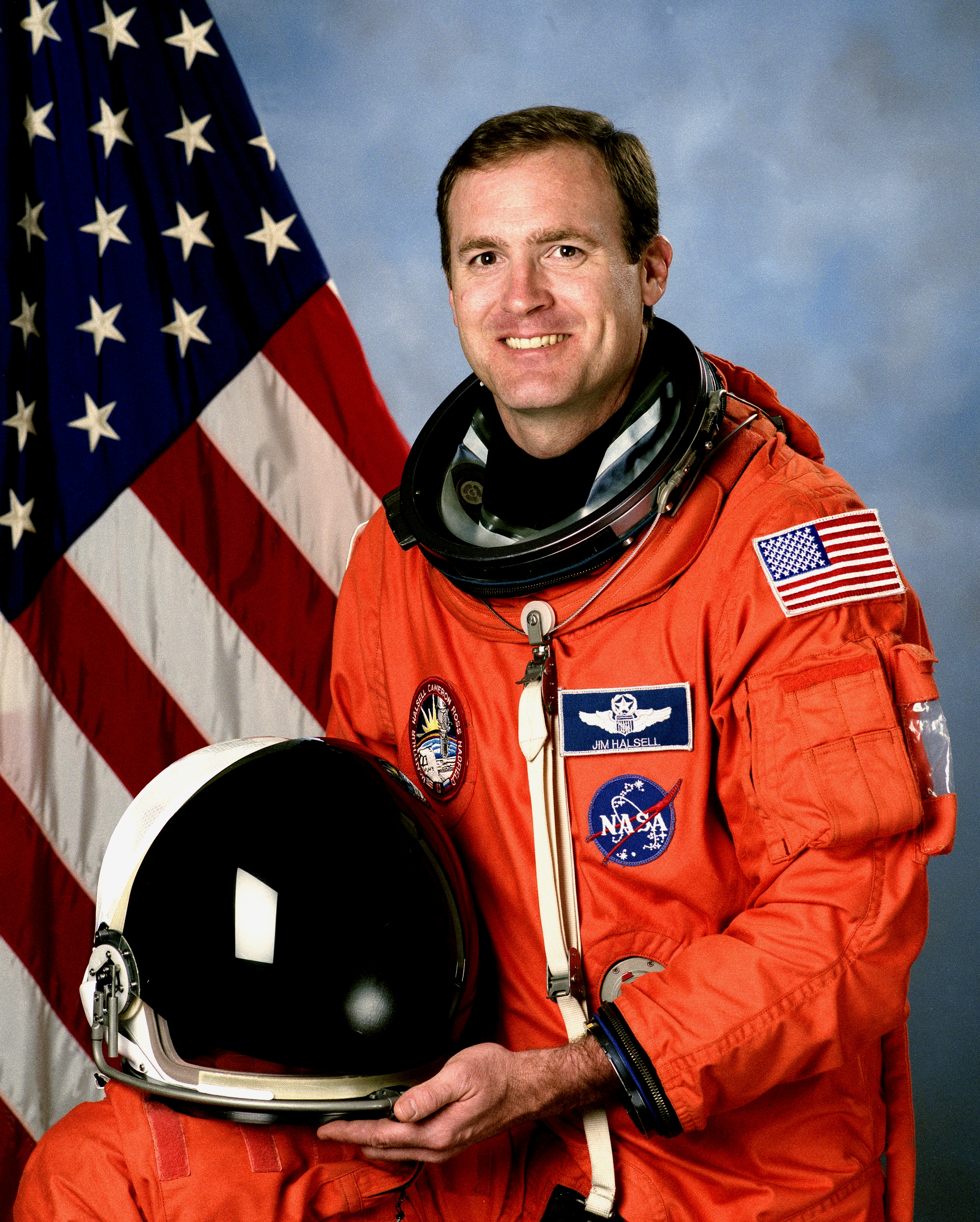
- Halsell in 1996
- Born: James Donald Halsell Jr. September 29, 1956 (age 70); West Monroe, Louisiana, U.S.
- Education: United States Air Force Academy (BS); Troy University (MS); Air University (MS)
- Space career

NASA astronaut
- Rank: Colonel, USAF
- Time in space: 52d 10h 34m
- Selection: NASA Group 13 (1990)
- Mission: STS-65; STS-74; STS-83; STS-94; STS-101
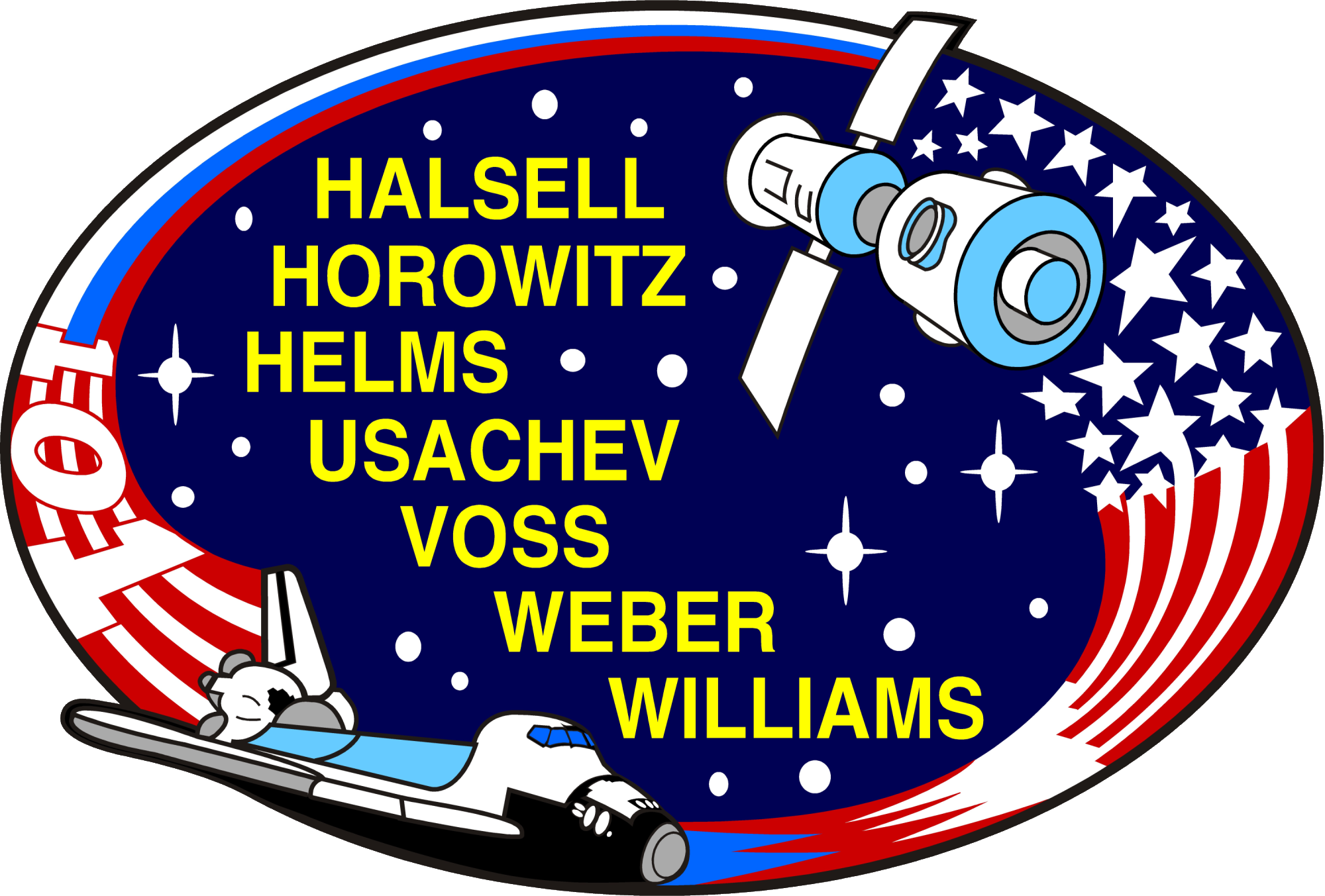
- Mission insignia

James D. Halsell
- Status: On probation
- Conviction: May 26, 2021 (pleaded guilty)
- Criminal charges: Two counts of manslaughter; Two counts of assault
- Penalty: 4 years in prison, followed by 10 years of probation with supervised release

James Donald Halsell Jr. (born September 29, 1956) is a retired United States Air Force officer and former NASA astronaut. The veteran of five Space Shuttle missions pled guilty in 2021 to two counts of manslaughter and two counts of assault as a result of a motor vehicle accident in 2016. He is the second American astronaut to spend time in jail after Lisa Nowak.

== Early life and education ==
James was born to Don and Jean Halsell in 1956. He was raised in West Monroe, Louisiana, and graduated West Monroe High School in 1974. He then graduated from the United States Air Force Academy with a Bachelor of Science degree in 1978. Halsell earned a Master of Science in Management from Troy University in 1983, and a Master's degree in Space Operations from the Air Force Institute of Technology of Air University in 1985.

== Military career ==
Halsell graduated from the U.S. Air Force Academy in 1978, and from Undergraduate Pilot Training at Columbus Air Force Base, Mississippi, in 1979. An F-4 pilot qualified in conventional and nuclear weapons deliveries, he served at Nellis Air Force Base, Las Vegas, Nevada, from 1980 to 1981, and Moody Air Force Base, Valdosta, Georgia, from 1982 to 1984. In 1984–1985, he was a graduate student at the Air Force Institute of Technology, Wright-Patterson Air Force Base, Dayton, Ohio. He then attended the Air Force Test Pilot School at Edwards Air Force Base, California, and during the next four years he performed test flights in the F-4, F-16 and SR-71 aircraft. Halsell retired from the Air Force in July 2004.

== NASA career ==
Selected by NASA in January 1990, Halsell became an astronaut in July 1991. A five flight veteran, Halsell has logged over 1,250 hours in space. He was the pilot on STS-65 (July 8–23, 1994) and STS-74 (November 12–20, 1995), and commanded STS-83 (Apr 4–8, 1997), STS-94 (July 1–17, 1997) and STS-101 (May 19–29, 2000). From February to August 1998, he served as NASA Director of Operations at the Yuri Gagarin Cosmonaut Training Center, Star City, Russia. Halsell also served as manager of Shuttle Launch Integration at Kennedy Space Center, Florida, from July 2000 to January 2003. Halsell was responsible for Space Shuttle preparation, launch, and return on 13 missions. After the Columbia accident, he led the NASA Return to Flight Planning Team, responsible for implementing the recommendations of the accident investigation board into the Shuttle Program, and resulted in the resumption of missions in 2005. He then served as the Assistant Director for Aircraft Operations Division of the Flight Operations Directorate. Halsell retired from NASA in November 2006 to accept a position with ATK Launch Systems, where he served as Vice President of Space Exploration Systems, and was the ATK site manager at Marshall Space Flight Center, Huntsville, Alabama. On October 10, 2011, Halsell joined Dynetics, as a technical director in their Space Division.

=== Spaceflights ===
STS-65 flew the second International Microgravity Laboratory (IML-2). During the 15-day flight, the crew conducted more than 80 experiments focusing on materials and life sciences research in microgravity. The mission was accomplished in 236 orbits of the Earth, traveling 6.1 million miles in 353 hours and 55 minutes.

STS-74 was NASA's second Space Shuttle mission to rendezvous and dock with the Russian Space Station Mir. During the 8-day flight, the Atlantis crew successfully attached a permanent docking module to Mir and transferred over 2,000 pounds of food, water and scientific supplies for use by the cosmonauts. The STS-74 mission was accomplished in 129 orbits of the Earth, traveling 3.4 million miles in 196 hours, 30 minutes, 44 seconds.

STS-83, the Microgravity Science Laboratory (MSL-1) Spacelab mission, was cut short because of problems with one of the Shuttle's three fuel cell power generation units. Mission duration was 95 hours and 12 minutes, traveling 1.5 million miles in 63 orbits of the Earth.

STS-94, a re-flight of the Microgravity Science Laboratory (MSL-1) Spacelab mission, focused on materials and combustion science research in microgravity. Mission duration was 376 hours and 45 minutes, traveling 6.3 million miles in 251 orbits of the Earth.

STS-101 was the third Shuttle mission devoted to International Space Station (ISS) construction. Objectives included transporting and installing over 5,000 pounds of equipment and supplies, and conducting a spacewalk. The mission was accomplished in 155 orbits of the Earth, traveling 4.1 million miles in 236 hours and 9 minutes.

== DUI and reckless murder charges ==
In 2014, Halsell had a blood alcohol level of 0.12 after causing a crash in Palmdale, California, north of Los Angeles, and pleaded no contest to a charge of drunken driving. In December 2014, a Los Angeles County Superior Court judge sentenced him to 60 months of probation, with the conditions that he not drive with alcohol or drugs in his system, and mandatory submission to any drug, alcohol or chemical test.

On June 6, 2016, while on his probation, Halsell was involved in an alleged driving under the influence crash in Tuscaloosa, Alabama. In the crash, 11- and 13-year-old half-sisters Niomi James and Jayla Parler were killed, and James' father and his girlfriend were injured. Halsell was subsequently charged with reckless murder and first-degree assault. He refused to provide a voluntary blood sample immediately after the crash. He was allegedly intoxicated, and investigators found an empty wine bottle and a packet of sleeping pills in a motel room where he was staying. He tried to steal and make a getaway in the truck of another motorist who had stopped to help. After being booked, he was released on a $150,000 bond.

On September 1, 2016, Halsell was indicted on two counts of murder for the traffic deaths. An initial hearing scheduled in June 2017 was delayed when Halsell's lawyers and those from the state were working toward a settlement. Several years later, the trial was set for March 9, 2020, and in January 2020, a judge ruled that prosecutors would not be permitted to tell the jury about Halsell's prior DUI conviction. This trial was postponed due to a death in the lawyer's family and rescheduled to August 3, 2020.

On May 27, 2021, Halsell pleaded guilty to two counts of manslaughter for the deaths of James and Parler, and pleaded guilty to two counts of assault for the injuries to James' father and his girlfriend. The guilty plea was given before a judge in Tuscaloosa, with Halsell immediately taken into custody. While sentencing guidelines include as much as two sentences (one for each manslaughter conviction) of 20 years and two sentences (one for each assault conviction) of 10 years, Halsell was sentenced to four years in prison, followed by 10 years of probation with supervised release. On May 26, 2025 Halsell was released from prison.

== Personal life ==
He is married to Kathy D. Spooner and they have a son and a daughter.

== Awards ==
In 1989, Halsell was awarded the Liethen-Title awards for having the best overall flying and academic performance at Air Force Test Pilot School at Edwards Air Force Base, California. He received two Defense Meritorious Service Medals in 1995 and 1996. He received the Distinguished Flying Cross in 1998, the NASA Distinguished Service Medal in 2001, and the NASA Outstanding Leadership Medal in 2002. He was also the recipient of four NASA Space Flight Medals in 1994, 1995, 1997 and 2000.
