= Charles E. Brady Jr. =

American astronaut (1951–2006)

Charles Brady
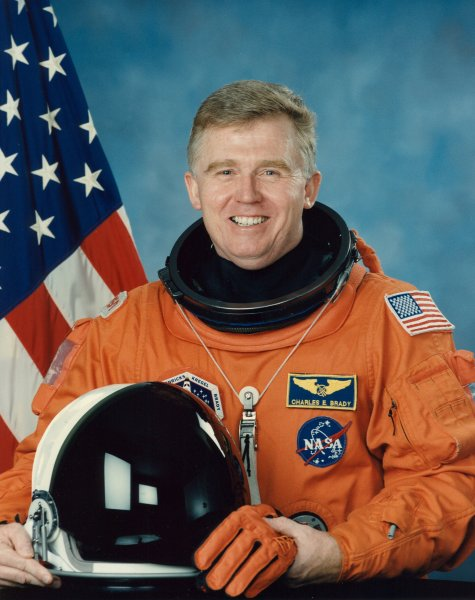
- Born: Charles Eldon Brady Jr. August 12, 1951; Pinehurst, North Carolina, U.S.
- Died: July 23, 2006 (aged 54); Oak Harbor, Washington, U.S.
- Education: University of North Carolina, Chapel Hill (BS); Duke University (MD)
- Space career

NASA astronaut
- Rank: Captain, USN
- Time in space: 16d 21h 48m
- Selection: NASA Group 14 (1992)
- Missions: STS-78
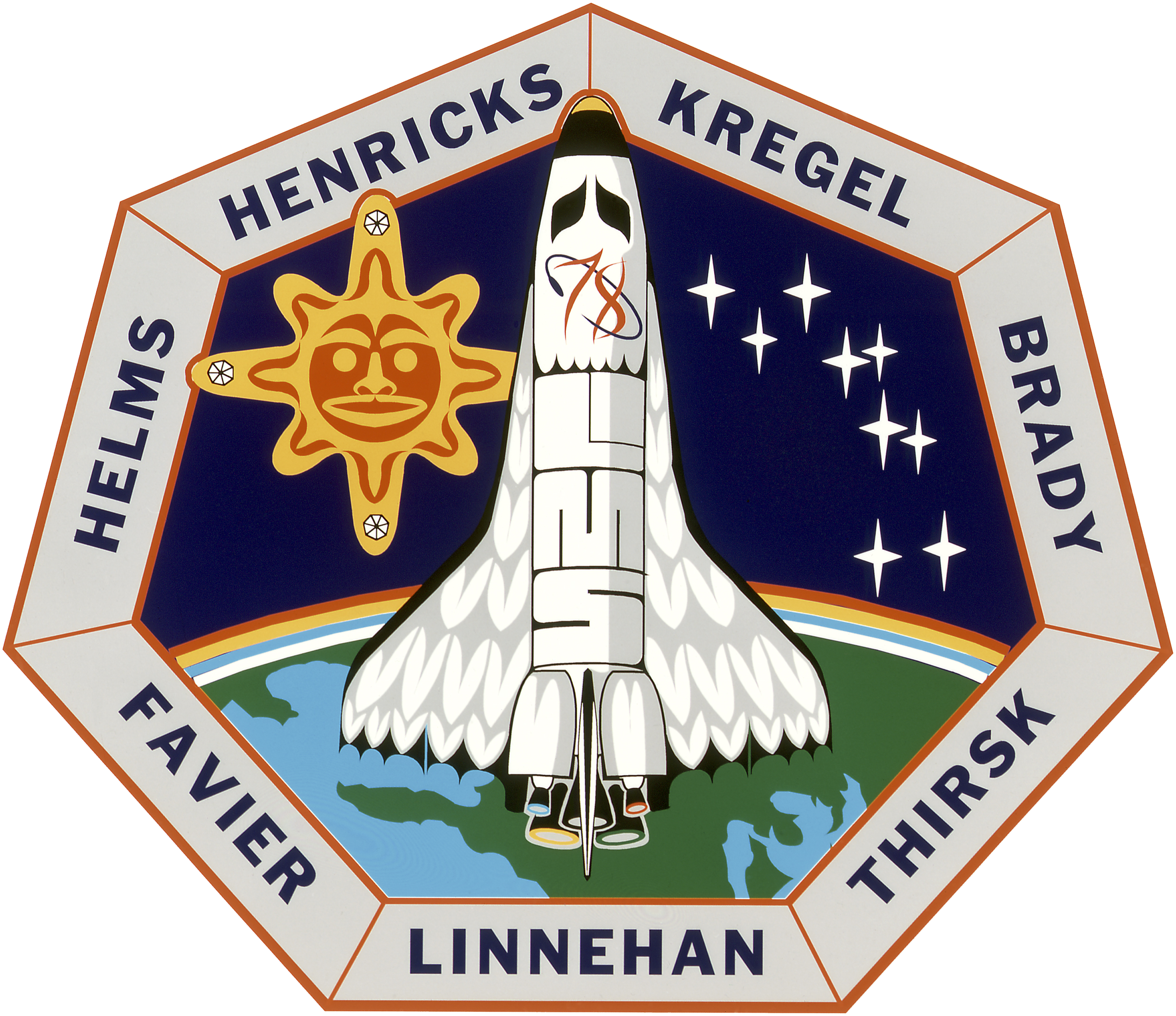
- Mission insignia

Charles Eldon Brady Jr. (August 12, 1951 – July 23, 2006) was an American physician, a captain in the United States Navy and a NASA astronaut. He spent 16 days in space on the Space Shuttle's STS-78 flight in 1996.

Brady specialized in sports medicine and worked as team physician at several universities before joining the US Navy in 1986. There he became a flight surgeon, serving with the Blue Angels flight demonstration squad from 1988–1990. In 1992 he was selected for NASA's astronaut program and completed training to prepare for space flight. After serving in the astronaut program, he returned full-time to the Navy and served as flight surgeon at Whidbey Island Naval Air Station in the San Juan Islands before retiring in the Pacific Northwest.

== Early life and education ==
Brady was born in Pinehurst, North Carolina, to Ann and Charles Brady, Sr. He grew up in the small town of Robbins, where his father was a physician. Brady attended local public schools, graduating from North Moore High School in Robbins in 1969. He had become an Eagle Scout and received the Distinguished Eagle Scout Award.

Brady studied pre-med at the University of North Carolina at Chapel Hill, graduating in 1971. He received his medical degree from Duke University in 1975. From Duke, he went to the University of Tennessee Medical Center in Knoxville for his internship.

== Career ==
In 1978 Brady started as the team physician in sports medicine for Iowa State University in Ames, Iowa. He continued in sports medicine and family practice for the next seven years, working as a team physician at the University of North Carolina at Chapel Hill, and East Carolina University in Greenville, North Carolina.

=== Military career ===
He joined the U.S. Navy in 1986, receiving training as a flight surgeon at the Naval Aerospace Medical Institute at Naval Air Station Pensacola, Florida. In June 1986 Brady reported to Carrier Air Wing Two on board the aircraft carrier USS Ranger; he was assigned to Attack Squadron 145 (VA-145) and Aviation Electronic Countermeasures Squadron 131 (VAQ-131).

In 1988 Brady was selected for the Blue Angels, the Navy Flight Demonstration Squadron, and served with them as flight surgeon through 1990. He was serving in Tactical Electronic Warfare Squadron 129 (VAQ-129) when he learned he had been selected for the astronaut program.

=== NASA career ===
Brady was selected by NASA in March 1992 and reported to the Johnson Space Center in August 1992. He was qualified for selection as a mission specialist on future Space Shuttle flight crews. Technical assignments included: working technical issues for the Astronaut Office Mission Development Branch; flight software testing in the Shuttle Avionics Integration Laboratory (SAIL); astronaut representative to the Human Research Policy and Procedures Committee; deputy chief for Space Shuttle astronaut training; and chief for Space Station astronaut training in the Mission Operations Division. He flew on STS-78 in 1996 and logged over 405 hours, more than 16 days, in space.

As an astronaut and amateur radio enthusiast, callsign N4BQW, Brady was one of the pioneers of the Shuttle Amateur Radio Experiment (SAREX), and a member of the American Radio Relay League.

==== STS-78 ====
STS-78 launched on June 20, 1996, and landed 16 days and 21 hours later on July 7, 1996, becoming the longest Space Shuttle mission to date. (Later that year the STS-80 mission broke that record by nineteen hours). The Life and Microgravity Spacelab mission served as a model for future studies on board the International Space Station. The mission included studies sponsored by ten nations, and five space agencies, and the international crew included a Frenchman, a Canadian, a Spaniard, and an Italian.

While with NASA, Brady held a number of jobs with the agency's astronaut office. He was chief of space station astronaut training before leaving to return to Navy duty, where he reached the rank of captain. He enjoyed canoeing, kayaking, tennis, biking, and amateur radio operating.

== Later years ==
In 2000, Brady was assigned as flight surgeon to Whidbey Island Naval Air Station in Washington state. He retired from the Navy in March 2006, after suffering for years from a severe kind of arthritis. He had enjoyed an active outdoor life and made several expeditions with a ham radio group to small islands in the South Pacific.

Brady died on July 23, 2006. He was survived by his fiancée, Susen Oseth, their son, Charles "Charlie" Brady III, his mother Ann Brady, and sister Jery Ann Kennedy. His father was deceased. When NASA announced his death, it said he had suffered from a lengthy illness, and this was reported by most major sources. A few days later, the Houston Chronicle reported the county sheriff's statement that Brady had died of self-inflicted wounds after suffering a long illness related to arthritis. He was buried near his father in Robbins, North Carolina.

It was not until a year later, in the context of reporting on other astronauts, that the media reported more widely that Brady had died by suicide. NASA internal emails related to Brady, which were released under the Freedom of Information Act, documented health issues and noted there was an investigation of his suicide, including interviews with family and friends.

== Organizations ==
- Association of Military Surgeons of the United States
- Society of United States Naval Flight Surgeons
- Aerospace Medical Association and Space Medicine Branch
- Phi Beta Kappa
- Phi Eta Sigma
- Ancient Free and Accepted Masons

== Special honors ==
- Defense Superior Service Medal
- Navy Commendation Medal with Gold Star
- Navy Achievement Medal
- Meritorious Unit Commendation with Battle "E"
- National Defense Service Medal
- Armed Forces Expeditionary Medal
- Sea Service Ribbon
- NASA Space Flight Medal
- Recipient of the Fox Flag for highest academic achievement at Naval Aerospace Medical Institute
- Richard E. Luehrs Memorial Award for Navy Operational Flight Surgeon of the Year (1987)
- Physician Coordinator for Operation Raleigh-USA (a British-sponsored international youth leadership program, selected by the U.S. Department of Defense)
