= Jean-Jacques Favier =

French astronaut (1949–2023)

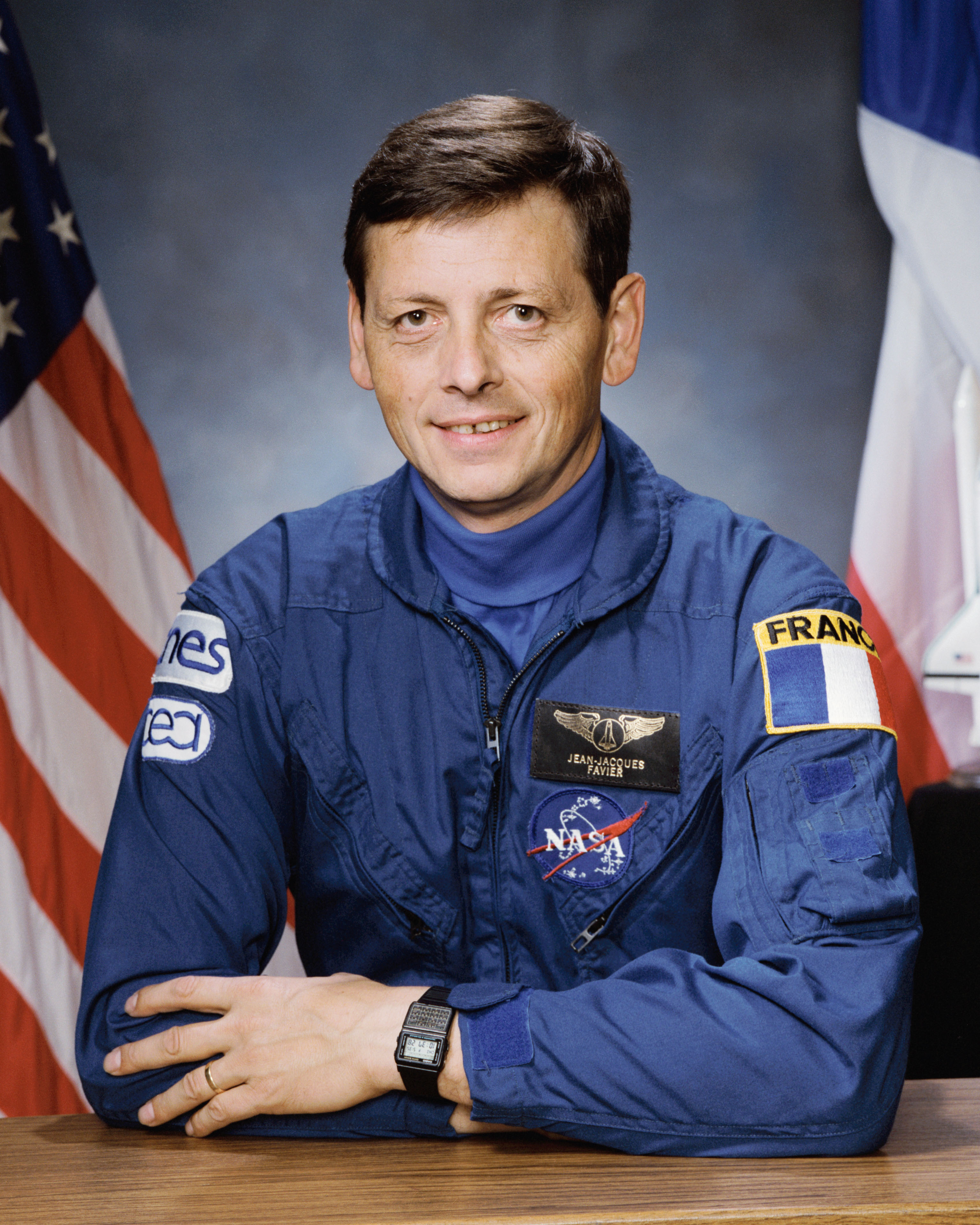
- Born: 13 April 1949; Kehl, Baden, Germany
- Died: 19 March 2023 (aged 73); Albi, France
- Education: Grenoble Institute of Technology
- Occupation: Engineer
- Spouse: Michèle Jean
- Children: 4
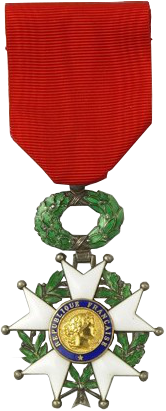
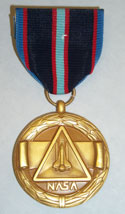
- Awards
- Space career

CNES astronaut
- Time in space: 16d 21h 48m
- Selection: 1985 CNES Group 2
- Missions: STS-78

Jean-Jacques Favier (French pronunciation: [ʒɑ̃ ʒak favje]; 13 April 1949 – 19 March 2023) was a German-born French engineer and a CNES astronaut who flew aboard the STS-78 NASA Space Shuttle mission in 1996. Favier was due to fly aboard the doomed Columbia mission in 2003 (STS-107), but later opted out of the mission. Jean-Jacques Favier was deputy director for space technology and deputy director for advanced concepts and strategy at CNES, director of the Solidification Laboratory at the French Atomic Energy Commission and research program director at the International Space University.

== Career ==
Favier was the advisor to the director of the Material Science Research Center (CEREM) at the French Atomic Energy Commission (CEA) and was detached to CNES. He proposed the MEPHISTO program, a collaborative project between the French Space Agency and NASA, and has developed many other scientific projects in collaboration with the United States since 1985. He was the principal investigator for a MEPHISTO materials processing experiment, which made its debut on the United States Microgravity Payload in 1992 and 1994. He became a CNES payload specialist in 1985. He has been principal investigator of more than ten space experiments in collaboration with ESA, NASA, and the Russian Space Agency.

Favier was assigned as an alternate payload specialist on STS-65/IML-2, the second International Microgravity Laboratory mission, and supported the mission as a Crew Interface Coordinator (CIC/APS) from the Payload Operations Control Center (POCC) at the Marshall Space Flight Center in Huntsville, Alabama.

Favier flew on STS-78 and logged over 405 hours in space. STS-78 Columbia (20 June to 7 July 1996) was a 16-day Life and Microgravity Spacelab mission. It included studies sponsored by ten nations and five space agencies, was the first mission to combine both a full microgravity studies agenda and a comprehensive life science investigation, and served as a model for future studies on board the International Space Station. STS-78 orbited the Earth 271 times, covering 7 million miles in 405 hours, 48 minutes.

Favier was a member of the board of advisors of the International Space University and also the chair of the research steering committee. He was co-founder of a remote imaging company called "Blue Planet", aimed at building a constellation of micro-satellites which image with a 1-meter resolution.

== Personal life and death ==
Born in Kehl, Germany, he married Michèle Jean. They had four children. He enjoyed skiing, tennis, wind-surfing, and archaeology.

Favier died on 19 March 2023, in Albi at the age of 73.

== Education ==
- Attended primary and secondary schools in Strasbourg, France
- 1971: Received an engineering degree from the INPG-ENSEEG (Grenoble Institute of Technology).
- 1977: Earned a PhD in engineering from the École des mines de Paris
- 1977: Earned a PhD in metallurgy and physics from the University of Grenoble

== Organisations ==
- Research Engineer, Commissariat à l'énergie atomique (CEA), 1976-1979
- Head Solidification Group 1970-1986
- Head of Laboratory 1986-1989
- Head Solidification and Crystal Growth Service, 1989 to 1993
- Cons. European Space Agency (ESA)
- Centre National D’Etudes Spatiales (CNES), Paris 1983 to present
- spationaut Candidate CNES, Paris 1985 to present
- Member of Space Station User Panel of ESA.

== Awards and honours ==
- Recipient Zellidja Association 2nd prize, French Academy Literature 1970, E. Brun Price Award French Academy Sciences
- Member of International Organization of Crystal Growth
- Member of American Association of Crystal Growth
- Societe Française de Metallurgie
- Groupe Français de Croissance Cristalline (Committee chairman)
- Visiting professor at University of Alabama in Huntsville (UAH) (1994–95)
- Member of the Space Science Committee of the European Science Foundation (ESF)
- Several patents on crystal growth processes, furnaces and in situ diagnosis
- French Legion of Honour
- NASA Space Flight Medal
- The Gold Medal of the City of Grenoble
- Published more than 130 research articles in refereed scientific journals and books
