= STS-78 =

1996 American crewed spaceflight to support the Life and Microgravity Spacelab

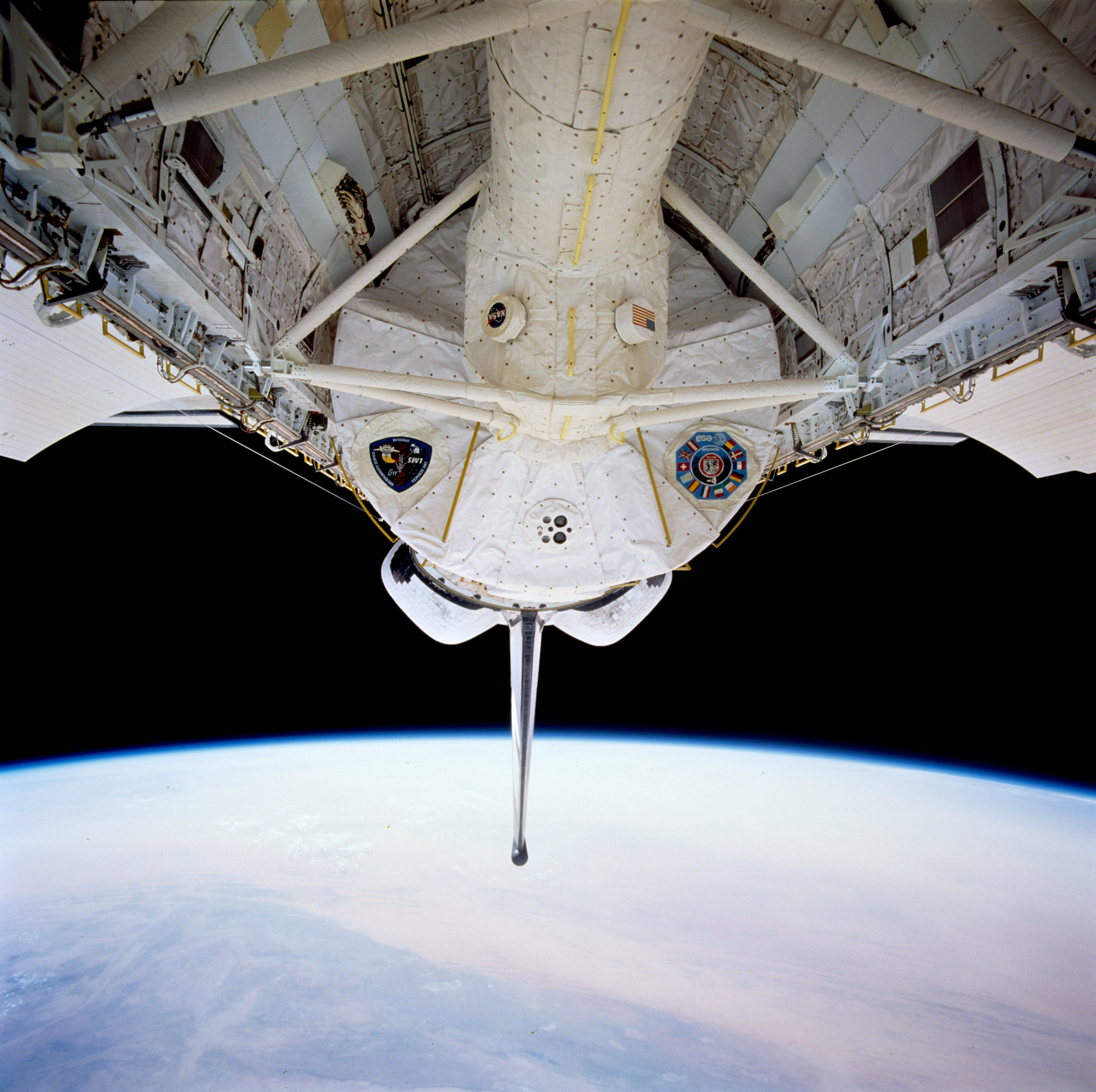
- Spacelab Module LM2 in Columbia's payload bay, serving as the Life and Microgravity Spacelab
- Mission type: Bioscience research Microgravity research
- Operator: NASA
- COSPAR ID: 1996-036A
- SATCAT no.: 23931
- Mission duration: 16 days, 21 hours, 48 minutes, 30 seconds
- Distance travelled: 11,000,000 kilometres (6,800,000 mi)
- Orbits completed: 271

Spacecraft properties
- Spacecraft: Space Shuttle Columbia
- Payload mass: 9,649 kilograms (21,272 lb)

Crew
- Crew size: 7
- Members: Terence T. Henricks; Kevin R. Kregel; Richard M. Linnehan; Susan Helms; Charles E. Brady Jr.; Jean-Jacques Favier; Robert Thirsk

Start of mission
- Launch date: June 20, 1996, 14:49:00.0075 UTC
- Launch site: Kennedy, LC-39B

End of mission
- Landing date: July 7, 1996, 12:37:30 UTC
- Landing site: Kennedy, SLF Runway 33

Orbital parameters
- Reference system: Geocentric
- Regime: Low Earth
- Perigee altitude: 246 kilometres (153 mi)
- Apogee altitude: 261 kilometres (162 mi)
- Inclination: 39.0 degrees
- Period: 89.6 minutes
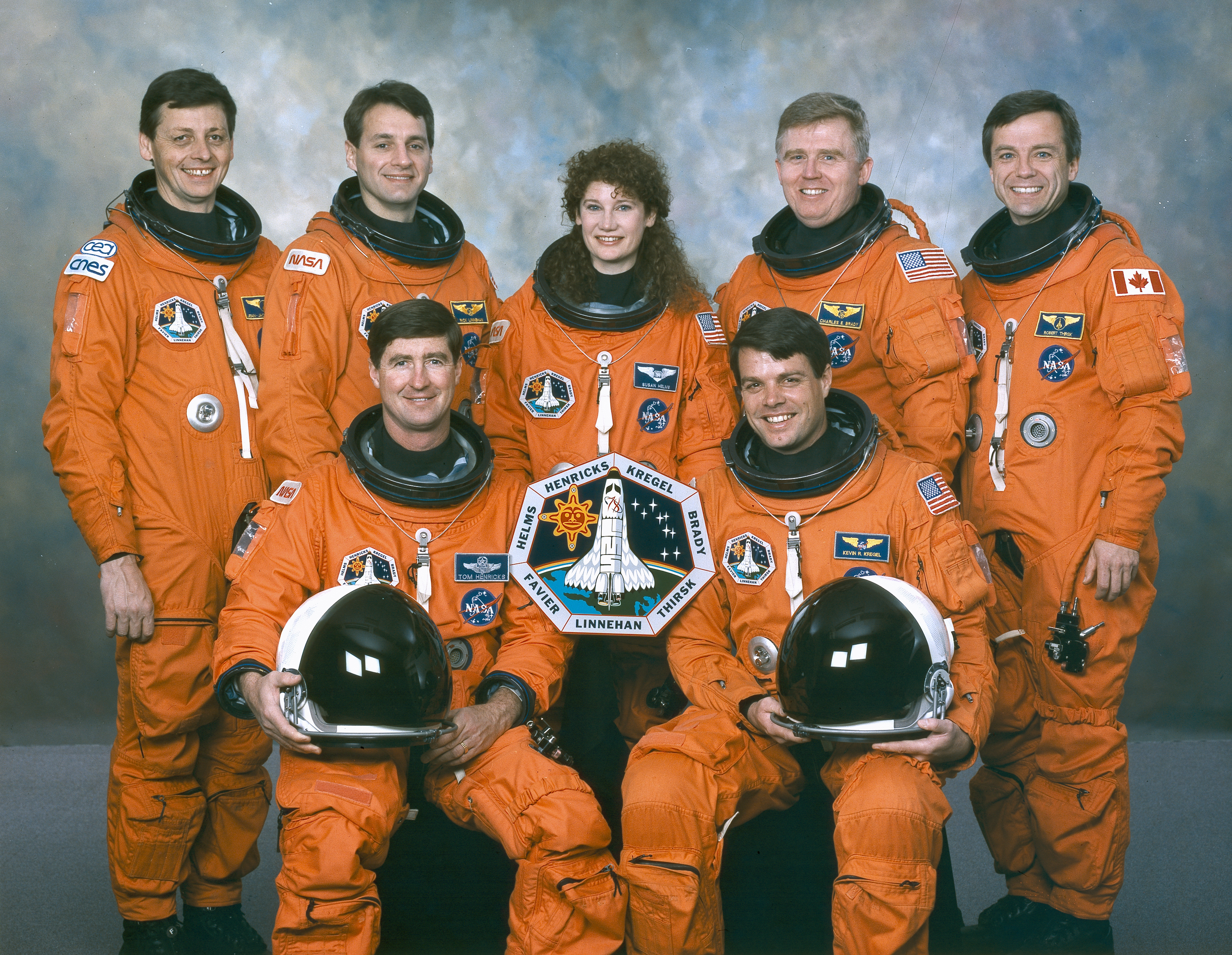
- Left to right – Seated: Henricks, Kregel; Standing: Favier, Linnehan, Helms, Brady, Thirsk Space Shuttle program

STS-78 was the fifth dedicated Life and Microgravity Spacelab mission for the Space Shuttle program, flown partly in preparation for the International Space Station project. The mission used the Space Shuttle Columbia, which lifted off successfully from Kennedy Space Center's Launch Pad 39B on June 20, 1996. This marked the 78th flight of the Space Shuttle and 20th mission for Columbia.

== Crew ==
Position	Astronaut
Commander	(United States) Terence T. Henricks; Fourth and last spaceflight
Pilot	(United States) Kevin R. Kregel; Second spaceflight
Mission Specialist 1	(United States) Richard M. Linnehan; First spaceflight
Mission Specialist 2 Flight Engineer	(United States) Susan Helms; Third spaceflight
Mission Specialist 3	(United States) Charles E. Brady Jr. Only spaceflight
Payload Specialist 1	(France) Jean-Jacques Favier, CNES; Only spaceflight
Payload Specialist 2	(Canada) Robert Thirsk, CSA; First spaceflight

=== Backup crew ===
Position	Astronaut
Payload Specialist 1	(Spain) Pedro Duque, ESA; First spaceflight
Payload Specialist 2	(Italy) Luca Urbani, ASI; First spaceflight

== Mission objectives ==
- Research into the effects of long-duration spaceflight on human physiology in preparation for flights on the International Space Station.
- 22 life science and microgravity experiments using the Orbiter's pressurized Life & Microgravity Spacelab module (LM2).
- Tests into the use of the Orbiter's Reaction Control System jets to raise the altitude of orbiting satellites.

=== Crew seat assignments ===
Seat	Launch	Landing	Seats 1–4 are on the flight deck. Seats 5–7 are on the mid-deck.
1	Henricks		Seats 1–4 are on the flight deck. Seats 5–7 are on the mid-deck.
2	Kregel		Seats 1–4 are on the flight deck. Seats 5–7 are on the mid-deck.
3	Linnehan	Brady	Seats 1–4 are on the flight deck. Seats 5–7 are on the mid-deck.
4	Helms		Seats 1–4 are on the flight deck. Seats 5–7 are on the mid-deck.
5	Brady	Linnehan	Seats 1–4 are on the flight deck. Seats 5–7 are on the mid-deck.
6	Favier		Seats 1–4 are on the flight deck. Seats 5–7 are on the mid-deck.
7	Thirsk		Seats 1–4 are on the flight deck. Seats 5–7 are on the mid-deck.

== Mission highlights ==
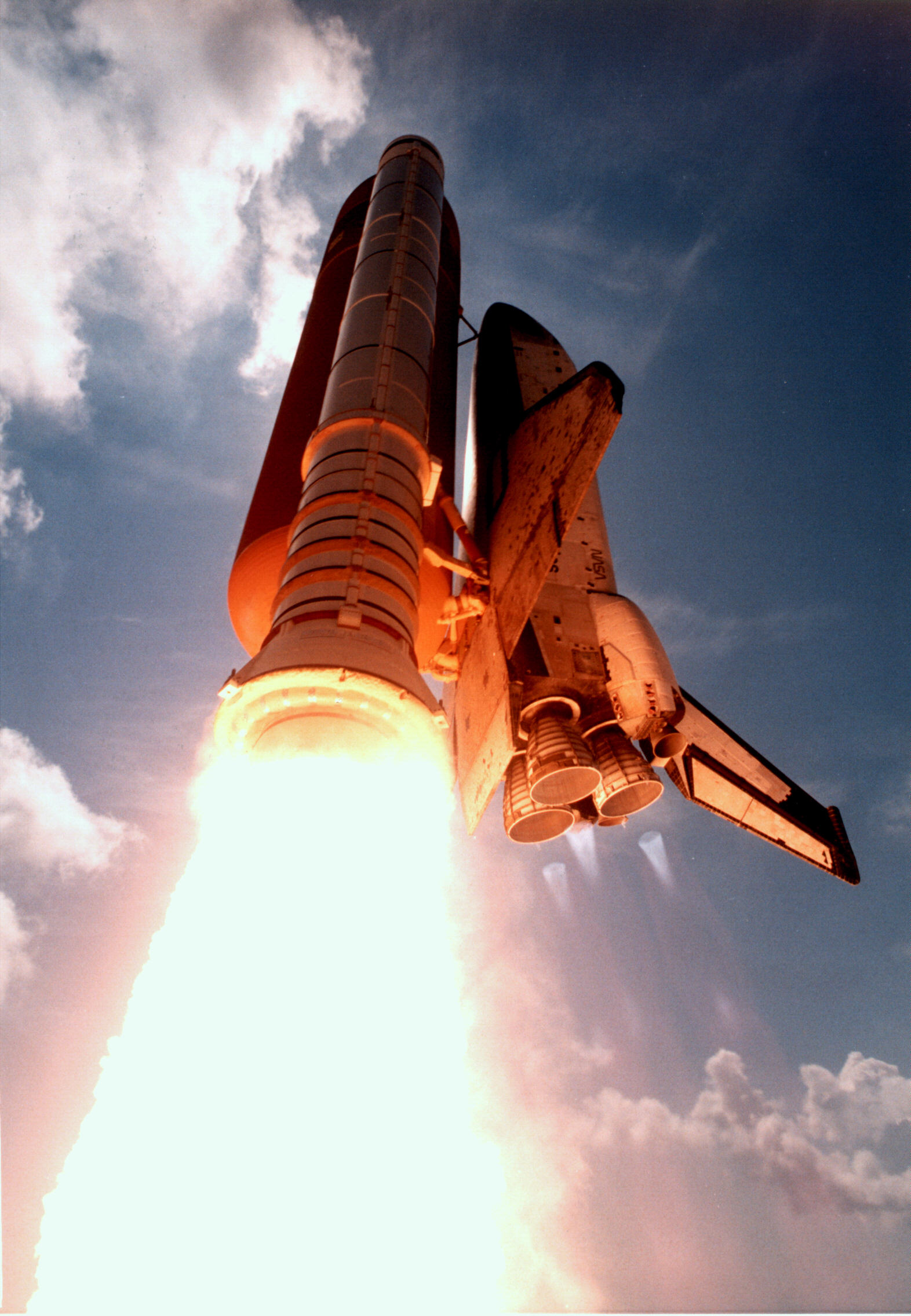
Launch of STS-78

During the 16-day, 21-hour mission, the crew of Columbia assisted in the preparations for the International Space Station by studying the effects of long-duration spaceflight on the human body in readiness for ISS Expeditions, and also carried out experiments similar to those now being carried out on the orbital station.

Following launch, Columbia climbed to an altitude of 278 kilometers (173 mi) with an orbital inclination of 39° to the Earth's equator to allow the seven-member flight crew to maintain the same sleep rhythms they were accustomed to on Earth and to reduce vibrations and directional forces that could have affected on-board microgravity experiments.

Once in orbit, the crew entered the 40 feet (12 m) long pressurized Spacelab module to commence over 40 science experiments to take place during the mission. Not only did these experiments make use of the module's laboratory, but also employed lockers in the middeck section of the orbiter. Thirteen of the experiments were dedicated to studying the effects of microgravity on the human body, whilst another six studied the behavior of fluids and metals in the almost weightless environment and the production of metallic alloys and protein crystals. The crew also carried out the first ever comprehensive study of sleep patterns in microgravity, research into bone and muscle loss in space, and in-flight fixes to problem hardware on the Bubble, Drop and Particle Unit (BDPU), designed to study fluid physics.

The mission also featured a test of a procedure that was later used during the second Hubble Space Telescope servicing mission to raise the telescope's altitude without damaging the satellite's solar arrays. During the test, Columbia's vernier Reaction Control System jets were gently pulsed to boost the Shuttle's altitude without jarring any of the mission payloads. The test was successful, and was later employed by Discovery during STS-82, and was used multiple times to boost the orbit of the ISS when docked with an orbiter.

== Mission anomaly ==
Although the launch went without any issue, an issue was discovered with the solid rocket boosters (SRBs) following their disassembly in June post-recovery. Analysis showed worrying damage to the field joints which was likely caused by hot gases. Failure of booster seals on the lower sections of Space Shuttle Challenger's right SRB ultimately caused the orbiter to break up mid-flight in 1986. This time the issue did not compromise astronaut safety because the hot gas path traveled through the engines' field joints but not their capture joint (containing the infamous "O-ring" seals). Despite there being no issue with safety, it did raise questions about a new Environmental Protection Agency (EPA)–mandated adhesive and cleaning fluid.

Due to the issue, STS-79 which was meant to dock with the Space Station Mir and return astronaut Shannon Lucid, was delayed. Options of returning Shannon on a Soyuz were considered, but never followed through as the Shuttle was considered safe and able to return Shannon.

== See also ==
- List of human spaceflights
- List of Space Shuttle missions
- Outline of space science
- STS-80 (17 day 8 hour Shuttle mission)
- STS-67 (16 days 15 hour Shuttle mission)
- STS-73 (15 days 21 hours Shuttle mission)
