= STS-65 =

1994 American crewed spaceflight

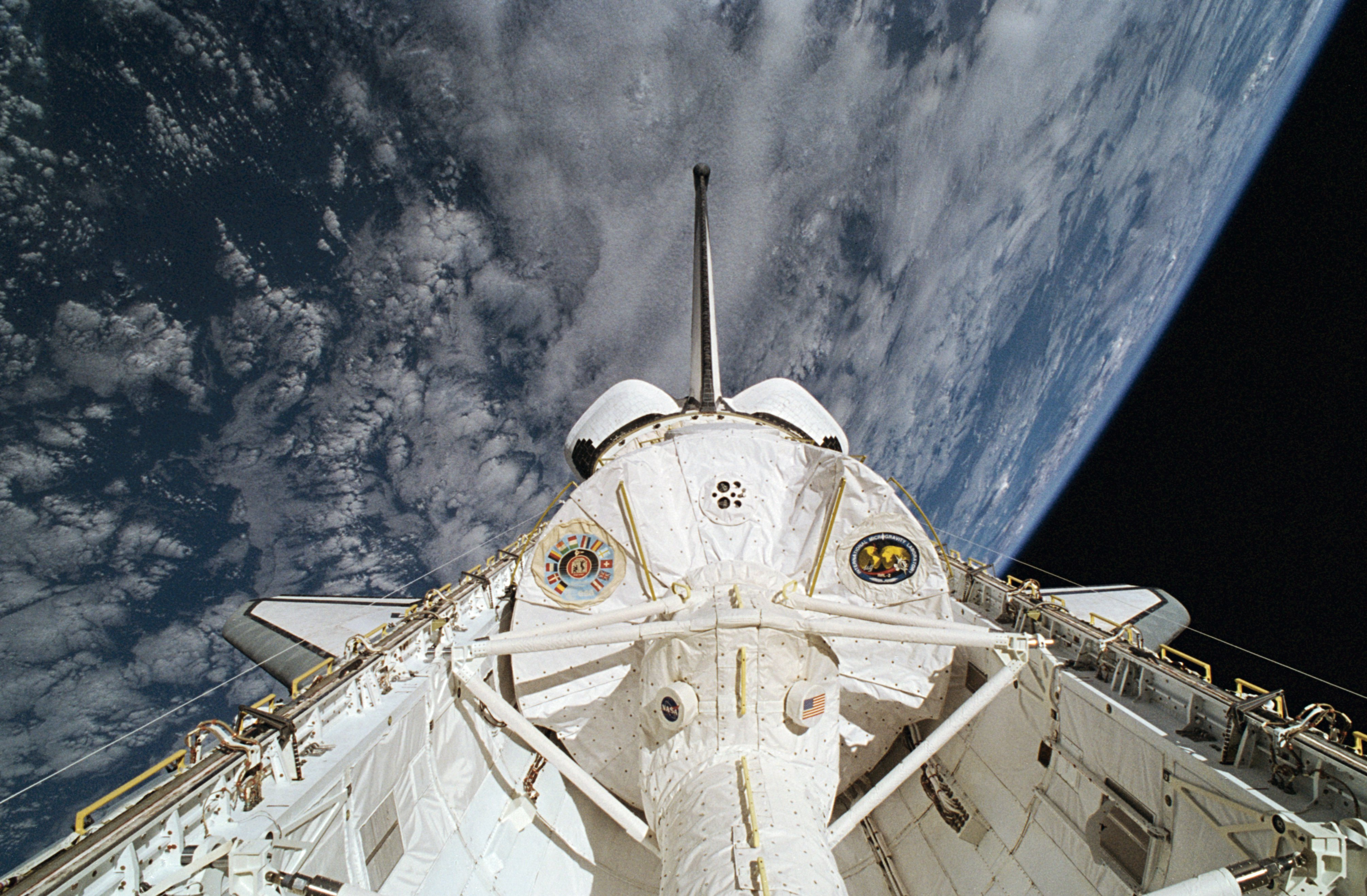
- Spacelab Module LM1 in Columbia's payload bay, serving as the International Microgravity Laboratory
- Names: Space Transportation System-65
- Mission type: Microgravity research
- Operator: NASA
- COSPAR ID: 1994-039A
- SATCAT no.: 23173
- Mission duration: 14 days, 17 hours, 55 minutes
- Distance travelled: 9,886,200 kilometers (6,143,000 mi)
- Orbits completed: 235

Spacecraft properties
- Spacecraft: Space Shuttle Columbia
- Payload mass: 10,811 kilograms (23,834 lb)

Crew
- Crew size: 7
- Members: Robert D. Cabana; James D. Halsell; Richard J. Hieb; Carl E. Walz; Leroy Chiao; Donald A. Thomas; Chiaki Naito-Mukai

Start of mission
- Launch date: 8 July 1994, 16:43:01 UTC
- Launch site: Kennedy, LC-39A

End of mission
- Landing date: 23 July 1994, 10:38:01 UTC
- Landing site: Kennedy, SLF Runway 33

Orbital parameters
- Reference system: Geocentric
- Regime: Low Earth
- Perigee altitude: 300 kilometres (190 mi)
- Apogee altitude: 304 kilometres (189 mi)
- Inclination: 28.45 degrees
- Period: 90.5 minutes
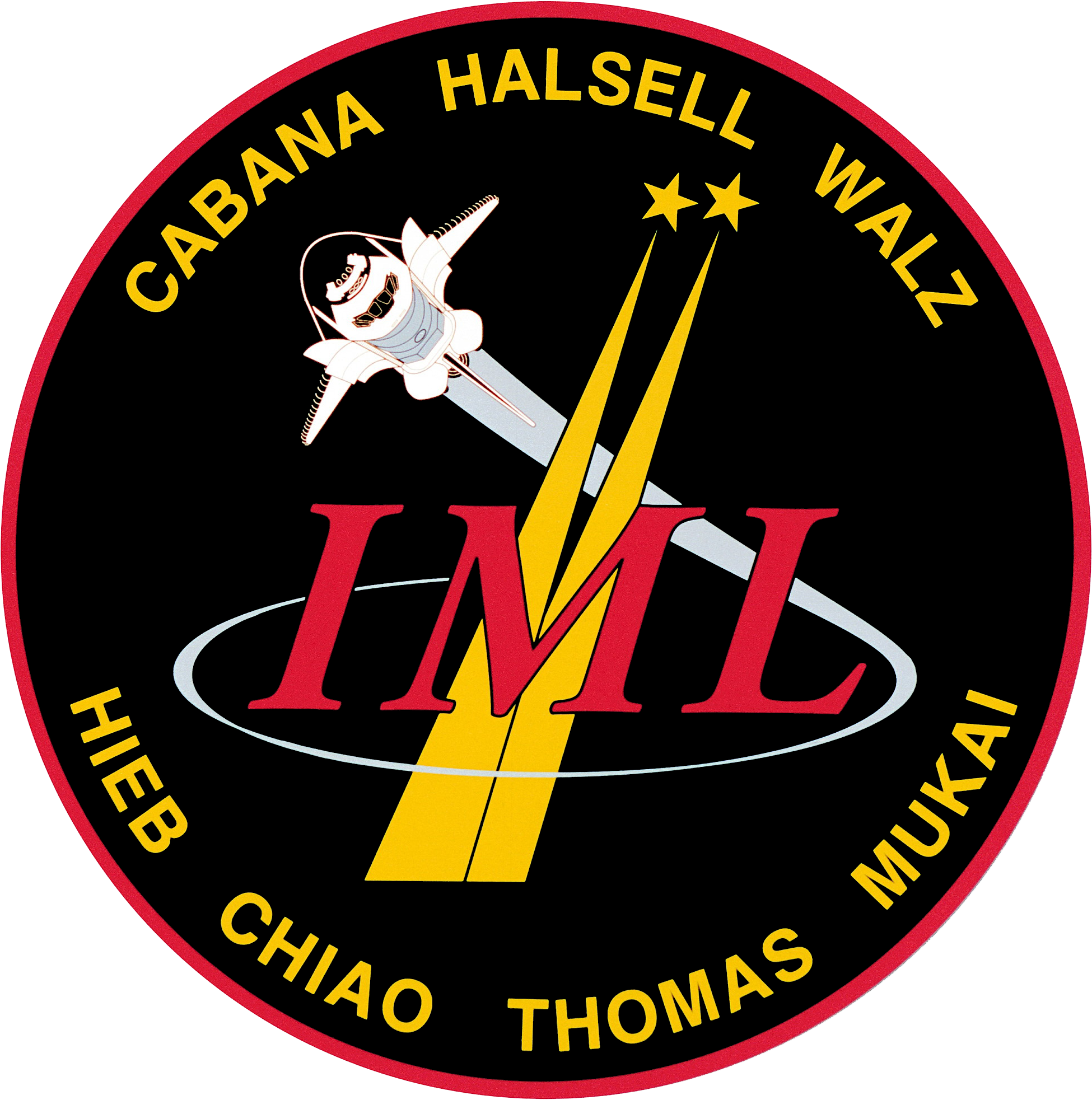
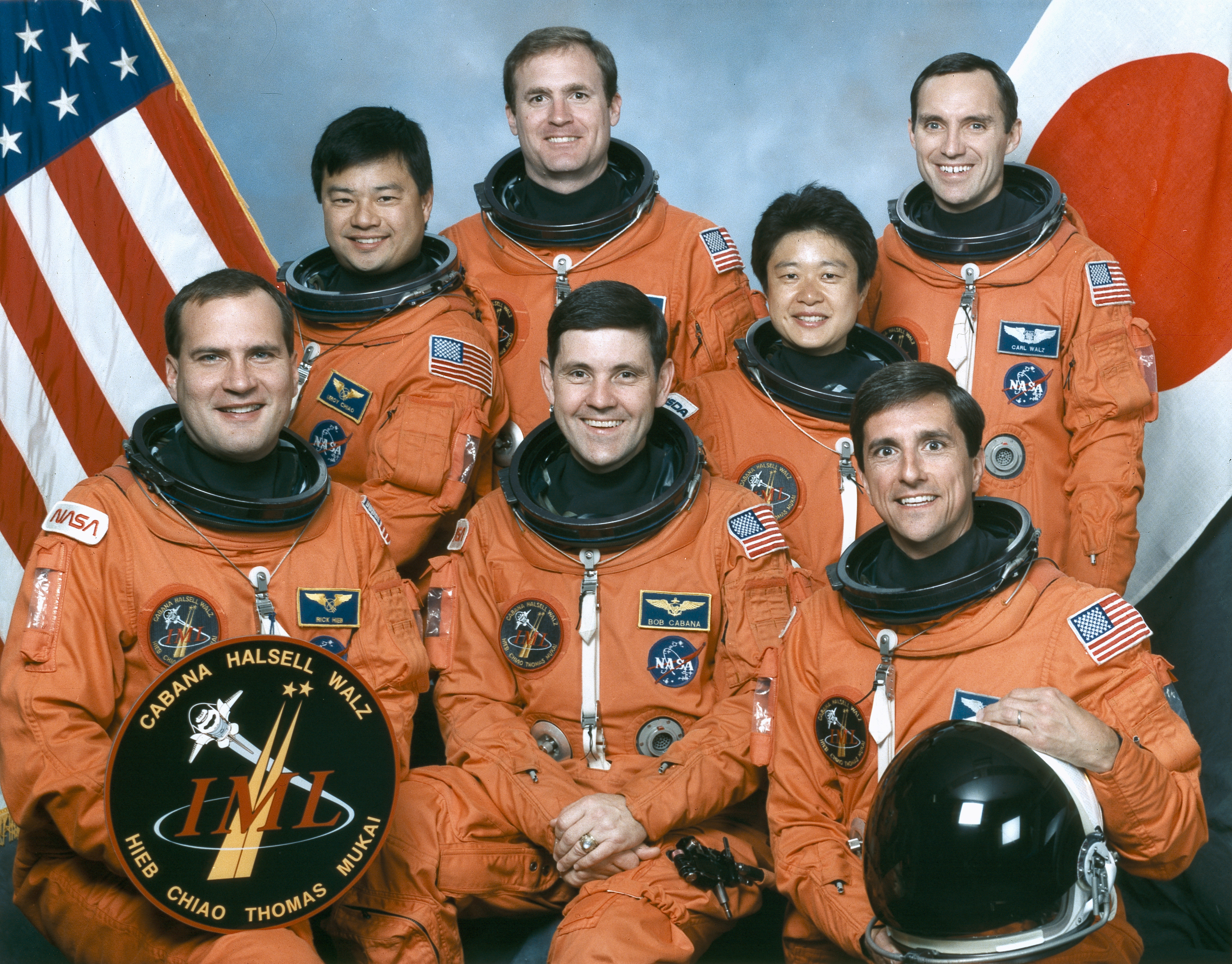
- Left to right - Seated: Hieb, Cabana, Thomas; Standing: Chiao, Halsell, Naito-Mukai, Walz Space Shuttle program

STS-65 was a Space Shuttle program mission of Columbia launched from Kennedy Space Center, Florida, 8 July 1994. The flight carried a crew of 7 and was commanded by Robert D. Cabana who would go on later to lead the Kennedy Space Center. STS-65 was an international science mission that carried the International Microgravity Laboratory (IML-2) on a 15-day mission which featured the first animals (Japanese rice fish) to conceive and bear offspring in space. Columbia returned to the Kennedy Space Center on 23 July 1994.

== Crew ==
Position	Astronaut
Commander	(United States) Robert D. Cabana; Third spaceflight
Pilot	(United States) James D. Halsell; First spaceflight
Mission Specialist 1	(United States) Richard J. Hieb; Third and last spaceflight
Mission Specialist 2 Flight Engineer	(United States) Carl E. Walz; Second spaceflight
Mission Specialist 3	(United States) Leroy Chiao; First spaceflight
Mission Specialist 4	(United States) Donald A. Thomas; First spaceflight
Payload Specialist 1	(Japan) Chiaki Mukai, NASDA; First spaceflight
Member of Blue Team; Member of Red Team

=== Backup crew ===
Position	Astronaut
Payload Specialist 1	(France) Jean-Jacques Favier, CNES; First spaceflight

=== Crew seat assignments ===
Seat	Launch	Landing	Seats 1–4 are on the flight deck. Seats 5–7 are on the mid-deck.
1	Cabana		Seats 1–4 are on the flight deck. Seats 5–7 are on the mid-deck.
2	Halsell		Seats 1–4 are on the flight deck. Seats 5–7 are on the mid-deck.
3	Hieb	Chiao	Seats 1–4 are on the flight deck. Seats 5–7 are on the mid-deck.
4	Walz		Seats 1–4 are on the flight deck. Seats 5–7 are on the mid-deck.
5	Chiao	Hieb	Seats 1–4 are on the flight deck. Seats 5–7 are on the mid-deck.
6	Thomas		Seats 1–4 are on the flight deck. Seats 5–7 are on the mid-deck.
7	Mukai		Seats 1–4 are on the flight deck. Seats 5–7 are on the mid-deck.

== Mission highlights ==
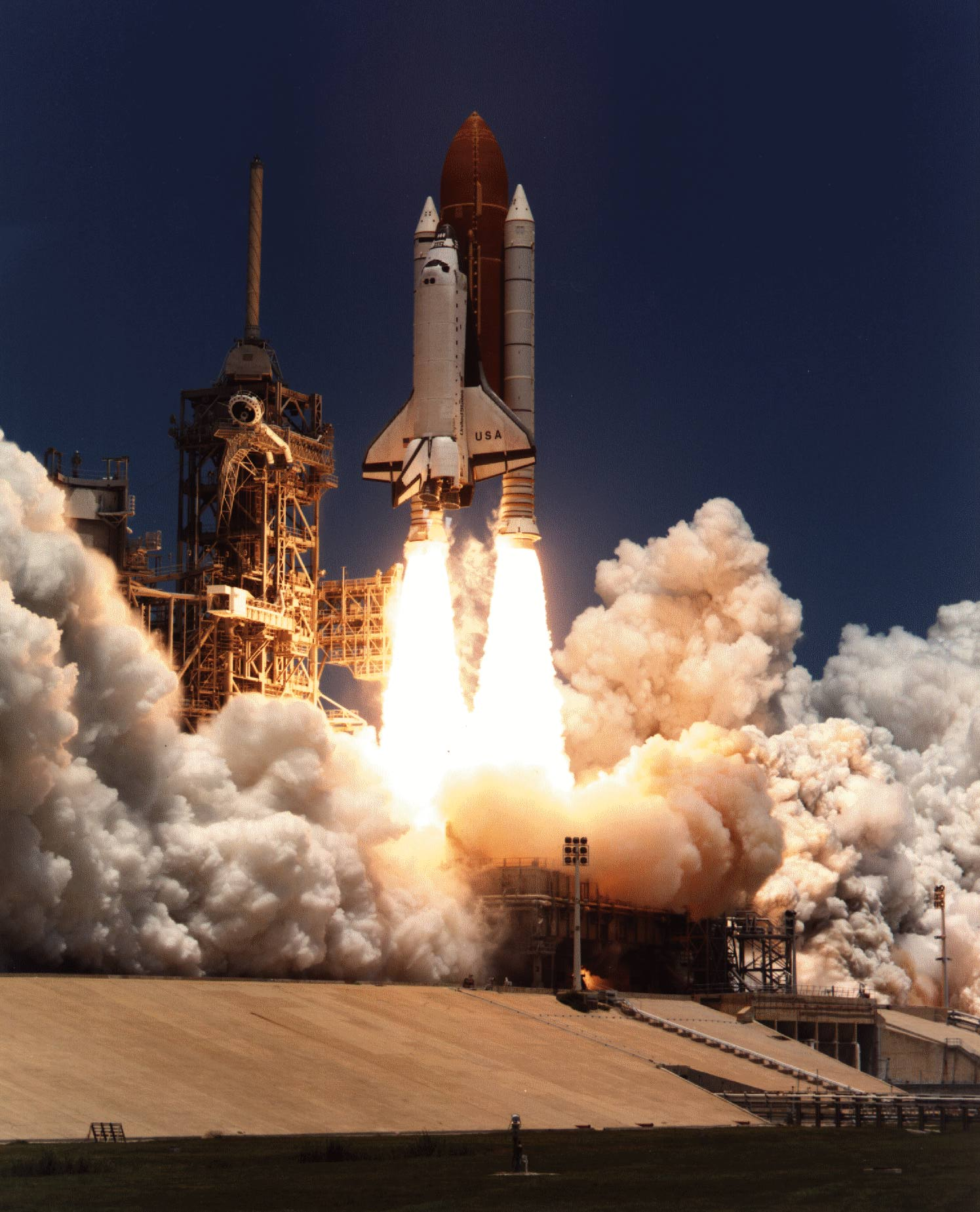
STS-65 launch

The International Microgravity Laboratory (IML-2) was the second in a series of Spacelab (SL) flights designed to conduct research in a microgravity environment. The IML concept enabled a scientist to apply results from one mission to the next and to broaden the scope and variety of investigations between missions. Data from the IML missions contributed to the research base for the space station.

As the name implies, IML-2 was an international mission. Scientists from the European Space Agency (ESA), Canada, France, Germany and Japan collaborated with NASA on the IML-2 mission to provide the worldwide science community with a variety of complementary facilities and experiments. These facilities and experiments were mounted in twenty 19" racks in the IML 2 Module.

Research on IML-2 was dedicated to microgravity and life sciences. Microgravity science covers a broad range of activities from understanding the fundamental physics involved in material behavior to using those effects to generate materials that cannot otherwise be made in the gravitational environment of the Earth. In life sciences research, a reduction of gravitation's effect allows certain characteristics of cells and organisms to be studied in isolation. These reduced gravitational effects also pose poorly understood occupational health problems for space crews ranging from space adaptation syndrome to long-term hormonal changes. On IML-2, the microgravity science and life sciences experiments were complementary in their use of SL resources. Microgravity science tends to draw heavily on spacecraft power while life sciences places the greatest demand on crew time.

Life Sciences Experiments and facilities on IML-2 included: Aquatic Animal Experiment Unit (AAEU) in Rack 3, Biorack (BR) in Rack 5, Biostack (BSK) in Rack 9, Extended Duration Orbiter Medical Program (EDOMP) and Spinal Changes in Microgravity (SCM) in the Center Isle, Lower Body Negative Pressure Device (LBNPD), Microbial Air Sampler (MAS), Performance Assessment Workstation (PAWS) in the middeck, Slow Rotating Centrifuge Microscope (NIZEMI) in Rack 7, Real Time Radiation Monitoring Device (RRMD) and the Thermoelectric Incubator (TEI) both in Rack 3.

Microgravity experiments and facilities on IML-2 included: Applied Research on Separation Methods (RAMSES) in Rack 6, Bubble, Drop and Particle Unit (BDPU) in Rack 8, Critical Point Facility (CPF) in Rack 9, Electromagnetic Containerless Processing Facility (TEMPUS) in Rack 10, Free Flow Electrophoresis Unit (FFEU) in Rack 3, Large Isothermal Furnace (LIF) in Rack 7, Quasi Steady Acceleration Measurement (QSAM) in Rack 3, Space Acceleration Measurement System (SAMS) in the Center Isle, and Vibration Isolation Box Experiment System (VIBES) in Rack 3.

Other payloads on this mission were: Advanced Protein Crystallization Facility (APCF), Commercial Protein Crystal Growth (CPCG), Air Force Maui Optical Site (AMOS) Calibration Test, Orbital Acceleration Research Experiment (OARE), Military Application of Ship Tracks (MAST), Shuttle Amateur Radio Experiment-II (SAREX-II). Columbia flew with an Extended Duration Orbiter (ED0) pallet and no RMS Arm was installed. This was also the 1st flight of the payload bay door torque box modification on Columbia and the 1st flight of new OI-6 main engine software.

== Mission overview ==
The second in the series of International Microgravity Laboratory payloads (IML-2) was launched on the Space Shuttle Columbia's STS-65 mission on 8 July 1994. After remaining in orbit around the Earth for 15 days, the Shuttle landed on 23 July. The seven-member crew included a Japanese astronaut, Chiaki Mukai, who was the first Japanese woman in space.

Besides NASA, the European Space Agency (ESA) and the space agencies of Japan (NASDA), Canada (CSA), Germany (DLR), and France (CNES) sponsored experiments on the mission. Investigators from a total of 13 countries participated in research into the behavior of materials and life in microgravity.

The IML-2 payload consisted of more than 80 experiments in microgravity and life sciences, including five life science experiments developed by American researchers. Of these, Ames Research Center sponsored two experiments using newts and jellyfish. Kennedy Space Center (KSC) sponsored the PEMBSIS experiment, designed to study plant embryogenesis in microgravity.

== Life Sciences Research Objectives ==
An experiment featuring Japanese rice fish sought to examine their mating behavior in microgravity.

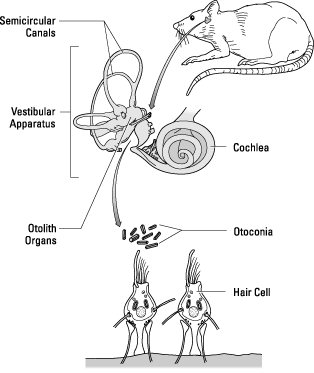
Together, the semicircular canals and the otolith organs make up the vestibular apparatus of the inner ear, which provides information to the brain about balance and motion in 3D space. The gravity-dependent otolith organs, lined with hair cell receptors and otoconia, detect linear acceleration of the head. When the head moves, the otoconia lag behind, bending the hair cell receptors and changing the directional signal to the brain.

The objective of the newt experiment was to study the early development of gravity-sensing organs (see figure). The utricle and saccule are specialized organs present in the inner ears of all vertebrate animals. They contain otoliths (or otoconia), calcium carbonate stones, which are deposited on a gelatinous membrane that lies over the sensory hair cells. The pull that gravity exerts on the otoliths is sensed by the hair cells, and information about the gravitational stimulus is transmitted to the brain via connecting nerve fibers. The experiment was designed to determine whether otolith production and development of otolith-associated receptor cells and nerve fibers may be altered in the microgravity environment of space.

The jellyfish experiment was designed to study behavior and development in space. Behavioral parameters studied included swimming, pulsing, and orientation. Study of developmental processes focused on gravity-sensing organs. The experiment also sought to determine the level of artificial gravity stimulus needed to counteract any negative effects of space flight.

The objective of the plant embryogenesis (PEMBSIS) experiment was to evaluate whether space flight affected the pattern and developmental progression of embryonic daylilies from one well-defined stage to another. It also examined whether cell division (mitosis) and chromosome behavior were modified by the space environment.

== Life Sciences Payload ==
=== Organisms ===
Four adult Japanese rice fish (2 males and 2 females) were included in the Aquatic Animal Experiment Unit, with an oriented light to help them find the correct posture for mating in the absence of gravity. The fish successfully mated and laid eggs. 8 eggs hatched in orbit, producing 8 healthy fry and another 30 eggs hatched after returning to Earth. 5 eggs never hatched, although this reflected an expected hatching rate for this species. This experiment therefore featured the first vertebrates to conceive and produce offspring in space.

Adults and larvae of the Japanese Red-Bellied Newt species (Cynopus pyrrhogaster) were used in the newt experiment. This species was selected for study partly because the vestibular system of very young newts undergoes most of its development in a period of time equivalent to the planned mission duration. Furthermore, adult females can be induced to lay eggs by injecting them with a hormone. Their eggs develop in orbit and mature in the microgravity environment to provide scientists with a sample of embryos that have undergone early development in microgravity.

Moon Jellyfish (Aurelia aurita) served as experiment subjects for the jellyfish experiment. Both the sedentary polyp stage and the free-swimming ephyra stage of the jellyfish were studied.

The PEMBSIS experiment studied embryogenically competent daylily (Hemerocallis cv. Autumn Blaze) cells.

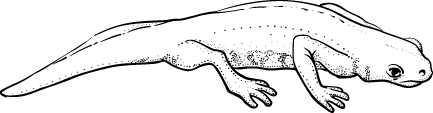
Japanese Red-Bellied Newt (Cynops pyrrhogaster)

=== Hardware ===
Newt adults and larvae were housed in cassette-type water tanks in the Aquarium Package within the Aquatic Animal Experiment Unit (AAEU), developed by NASDA, the Japanese space agency. The AAEU is a life support unit that can keep fish or other aquatic animals alive for at least 19 days in the Spacelab. It consists of a Main Unit, an Aquarium Package, and a Fish Package, each of which has an independent life support system. In IML-2, each cassette held an egg container with individual egg holes (6-mm diameter, approximately 12 mm deep).

A slow rotating centrifuge microscope and camera system, Nizemi, developed by DLR (formerly DARA), the German space agency, was used to examine and videotape the behavior of the jellyfish ephyrae and polyps at up to 15 varying levels of G and at a temperature of 28 °C (to facilitate swimming activity). The Nizemi provides observation of samples under variable acceleration levels between 10–3 and 1.5 G and a controllable temperature between 18 and 37 °C.

Jellyfish were housed in the European Space Agency's Biorack facility within Biorack Type I containers. For descriptions of the facility and containers, see IML-1.

A Refrigerator/Incubator Module (R/IM) held fixed jellyfish specimens. The R/IM is a temperature-controlled holding unit flown in the Shuttle middeck that maintains a cooled or heated environment. It is divided into two holding cavities and can contain up to six shelves accommodating experiment hardware. An Ambient Temperature Recorder (ATR-4) was placed inside the R/IM. For a general description of the ATR-4, see IML-1.

The PEMBSIS experiment used hardware provided by the National Space Development Agency (NASDA) of Japan. As part of the NASDA Life Science Cell Culture Kit, this experiment used six petri-dish-like Plant Fixation Chambers (PFCs). The PFCs were used to hold the cultured plant cells for the PEMBSIS experiment. These containers are completely sealed. The PFCs allow plant cells exposed to space flight to be fixed in orbit by insertion of a chemical fixative via syringe through a septum port.

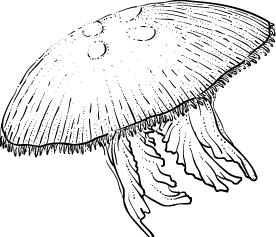
Jellyfish (Aurelia aurita)

== Operations ==
=== Preflight ===
PEMBSIS cell cultures were prepared about a week before launch. Twelve chambers were filled with a semi-solid medium. Six were transported to KSC and kept in an unlit incubator at 22±2 °C until they were loaded into the Shuttle. The other six were used as ground controls.

Approximately 36 hours before launch, 148 prefertilized newt eggs were loaded into the three cassettes of the AAEU. Four adult newts were also loaded into the cassettes; two cassettes each contained one newt apiece, while a third contained two. Fresh, aerated water at 24 °C circulated continuously through the unit. A similar unit was maintained at KSC as a ground-control.

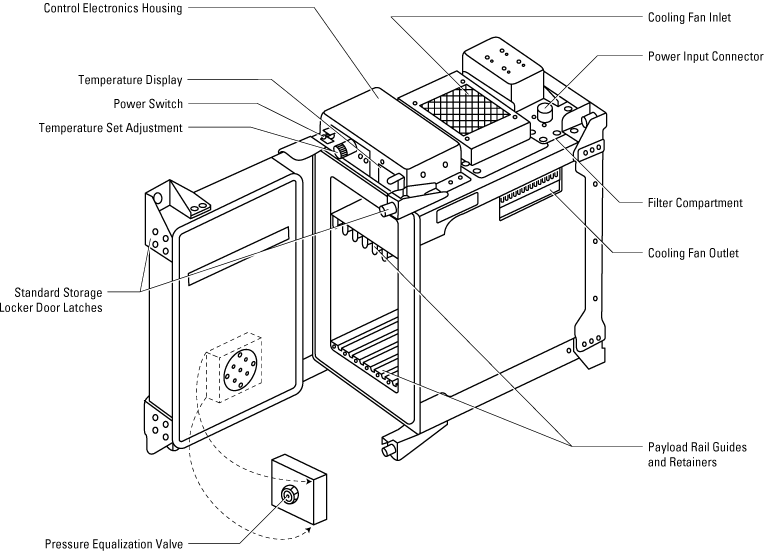
The Refrigerator/Incubator Module (R/IM) is a temperature-controlled holding unit flown in the Shuttle middeck. The R/IM uses a solid-state heat pump to maintain a cooled or heated internal environment.

Twenty-four hours before launch, four groups of six jellyfish polyps each were given iodine in artificial sea water (ASW) to induce strobilization of polyps into the ephyrae form.

Shortly before flight, the jellyfish samples were loaded into a total of 10 Nizemi cuvettes containing ASW and placed in Type I containers. For the behavior study, a group of normal ephyrae and a group of ephyrae without statoliths were placed in the Biorack 22 °C incubator. The third group of ephyrae was placed in the Biorack 1-G centrifuge. Two groups of polyps were used for the development study. One group was placed in the incubator and the other was placed in the 1-G centrifuge. A similar set of equipment was maintained at the KSC ground-control facility.

=== Inflight ===
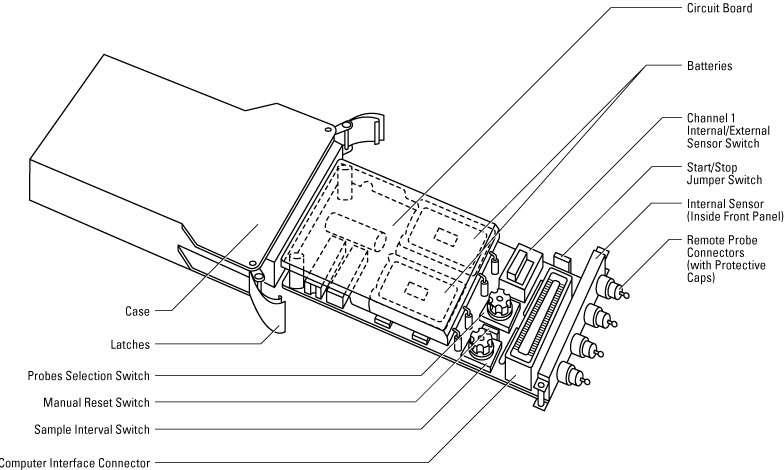

The Ambient Temperature Recorder (ATR-4) is a self-contained, battery-powered instrument, approximately the size of a deck of cards. It may be placed in almost any environment (not submersible in liquid) to provide recording of up to four channels of temperature data.

On flight days 6, 8, and 11, the crew carried out video observations of newt eggs to document the rate of development. The crew also made observations of the adult newts at specified times. On both the fifth and ninth days of flight, an adult newt was found dead, causing the loss of some eggs because of contamination. The remaining two adult newts survived the flight and were recovered live upon landing.

One cuvette from each group of jellyfish ephyrae and polyps were videotaped on the rotating microscope/centrifuge at intervals throughout the mission to determine the G-threshold for the swimming behavior of the ephyrae. On flight day five, both the flight and ground-control groups of ephyrae with statoliths that had been hatched on Earth were fixed. On flight day 13, two of the four groups of polyps that had been strobilation-induced were fixed. The remaining ephyrae and polyps were returned to Earth for postflight analysis.

To provide a comparison between flight-fixed and ground-fixed groups in the PEMBSIS experiment, the crew fixed some cultures shortly before landing. The fixative was a three-percent glutaraldehyde (balance water) solution. Each chamber was fixed with a 20-ml injection of fixative.

=== Postflight ===
The flight cassettes containing the newts were retrieved approximately six hours after landing. Some of the larvae were fixed and preserved for later analysis, while some were tested to estimate how space flight affected the gain of the otolith-ocular reflex and measure the otolith volumes and areas of associated sensory epithelia.

Living jellyfish were counted, coded, and photographed beginning at five hours postflight. The pulse rate, numbers of arms, rhopalia, and statoliths were counted in each of the ephyrae. Those with abnormal pulsing were videotaped after landing and again approximately 24 hours later. Some of both the flight and control jellyfish were allowed to form clones, which were then examined for arm number and other structural differences.

After the PEMBSIS cell culture chambers were recovered from the Shuttle, specimens of living cells and somatic embryos were photographed, counted, and chemically fixed within nine hours of landing, before their first division cycle on Earth was complete. Chromosomes were measured and compared within and among cultures.

== Results ==
=== Newt Study ===
According to morphogical analysis, both flight and ground controls developed at the same rates. Analysis of three-dimensional reconstructions showed that flight-reared larvae had a larger mean endolymphatic sac (ES) and duct volume and a larger average volume of otoconia within the sac when compared to similarly staged ground controls. Furthermore, the appearance of otoconia in the ES was greatly accelerated in the larvae reared in microgravity.

=== Jellyfish Study ===
Ephyrae that developed in microgravity had significantly more abnormal arm numbers as compared with 1-G flight and ground controls. As compared to controls, significantly fewer ephyrae that developed in space swam when tested postflight. Polyps budding in space produced more buds and were developmentally ahead of ground controls. Although development through budding and through metamorphosis proceeded well in space, some jellyfish are apparently more sensitive to microgravity than others, as evidenced by their abnormal arm development.

=== Daylily Cell Study ===
Cytological changes and chromosomal aberrations were seen in both flight-fixed and ground-fixed flight cells. A substantial number of binucleate cells, cells possessing two nuclei, were also found in the flight samples. The ground-control samples were all uninucleate.

== Newts ==
At least two of the four adult newts died on the voyage. The first newt death was attributed simply to stress. The second dead newt was found by Donald A. Thomas late on Sunday 17 July 1994 while checking the tanks, however the second death was called "peculiar" in a comment by Dr. Michael Wiederhold, a scientist on the ground. At the time it was said it would be difficult to remove the newt from the tank because of weightlessness, but the dead animal could contaminate the tank if left inside. The newts were Japanese Red-bellied Newts (Cynops pyrrhogaster).

== See also ==
- List of human spaceflights
- List of Space Shuttle missions
- Outline of space science
- Space Shuttle
